= Geshe =

Tibetan Buddhist academic degree

Geshe (Tibetan: དགེ་བཤེས་, Wylie: dge-bshes, short for dge-ba'i bshes-gnyen, "virtuous friend"; translation of Skt. kalyāņamitra) or geshema is a Tibetan Buddhist academic degree for monks and nuns. The degree is emphasized primarily by the Gelug lineage, but is also awarded in the Sakya and Bön traditions. The equivalent geshema degree is awarded to women.

== History ==
The title Geshe was first applied to esteemed Kadampa masters such as Geshe Chekawa Yeshe Dorje (1102–1176), who composed an important lojong text called Seven Points of Mind Training and Geshe Langri Tangpa (dGe-bshes gLang-ri Thang-pa, 1054–1123).

The geshe curriculum represents an adaptation of subjects studied at Indian Buddhist monastic universities such as Nālandā. These centers were destroyed by Islamic invaders of India, leaving Tibet to continue the tradition. It first developed within the Sakya monastic lineage, where it was known as ka-shi ("four subjects") or ka-chu ("ten subjects"). The Sakyas also granted degrees at the conclusion of these studies, on the basis of proficiency in dialectical ritualized debate. In Tsongkhapa's time the Sakya degree was awarded at Sangphu, Kyormolung and Dewachen (later Ratö) monasteries.

The geshe degree flowered under the Gelug monastic lineage. Under Gelug domination, monks from various monastic lineages would receive training as geshes through the great Gelug monasteries. Gelugpa geshes often went on to study at one of Lhasa's tantric colleges, Gyütö or Gyüme. (The tantric colleges also grant a "geshe" title for scholarship in the tantras.)

Under Sakya and Gelug influence, the Kagyu and Nyingma monastic lineages developed their own systems of scholarly education. Their schools grant the degree of ka-rabjampa ("one with unobstructed knowledge of scriptures") as well as the title Khenpo, which the Gelug tradition reserves for Abbot (Buddhism). The course of study which prevails in Kagyu and Nyingma circles emphasizes commentary over debate, and focuses on a somewhat wider selection of classics (with accordingly less detail). It ideally lasts for nine years, concluding with a three-year, three-month meditation retreat.

In April 2011, the Institute for Buddhist Dialectical Studies (IBD) in Dharamsala, India, conferred the degree of geshe on Venerable Kelsang Wangmo, a German nun, thus making her the world's first female geshe.

In 2013, Tibetan women were able to take the geshe exams for the first time.

In 2016, twenty Tibetan Buddhist nuns became the first Tibetan women to earn geshema degrees. The geshema degree is the same as a geshe degree, but is called a geshema degree because it is awarded to women.

== Curriculum ==
The Geshe curriculum consists of the "Collected Topics" (Tibetan: བསྡུས་གྲྭ་, Wylie: bsdus-grwa) which were preliminary to the syllabus proper, as well as the five major topics, which form the syllabus proper.

The exoteric study of Buddhism is generally organized into "five topics", listed as follows with the primary Indian source texts for each:

1. Abhidharma (Higher Knowledge, Wylie Tib.: mdzod)
  - Compendium of Higher Knowledge (Abhidharma Samuccaya) by Asanga
  - Treasury of Higher Knowledge (Abhidharma Kośa) by Vasubandhu
2. Prajñā Pāramitā (Perfection of Wisdom, Wylie Tib.: phar-phyin)
  - Ornament of Clear Realization (Abhisamayālaṃkāra) by Maitreya as related to Asaṅga
  - The Way of the Bodhisattva (Bodhisattvacaryāvatāra, Wylie Tib.: sPyod-'jug) by Śāntideva
3. Madhyamaka (Middle Way, Wylie Tib.: dbu-ma)
  - Fundamental Wisdom of the Middle Way (Mūlamadhyamakakārikā, Wylie Tib.: rTsa dbu-ma) by Nāgārjuna
  - Four Hundred Verses on the Yogic Deeds of Bodhisattvas (Catuḥśataka) by Āryadeva
  - Introduction to the Middle Way (Madhyamakāvatāra, Wylie Tib.: dBu-ma-la 'Jug-pa) by Candrakīrti
  - Ornament of the Middle Way (Madhyamakālaṃkāra) by Śāntarakṣita
  - The Way of the Bodhisattva (Bodhisattvacaryāvatāra, Wylie Tib.: sPyod-'jug) by Śāntideva
4. Pramāṇa (Logic, Wylie Tib.: tshad-ma)
  - Treatise on Valid Cognition (Pramāṇavarttika) by Dharmakīrti
  - Compendium on Valid Cognition (Pramāṇasamuccaya) by Dignāga
5. Vinaya (Vowed Morality, Wylie Tib.: 'dul-ba)
  - The Root of the Vinaya (Vinaya-mūla-sūtra, Dülwa Do Tsawa, Wylie Tib.: 'dul-ba mdo rtsa-ba) by the Pandita Gunaprabha

== Conferral of the degree ==
In the Gelug school, the degree may not be earned by laypeople (though some recipients later give up their robes), or until recently by women (including nuns). The first geshema degree was conferred to a German nun, Kelsang Wangmo, in 2011. The Gelug curriculum, which lasts between 12 and 40 years, centers around textual memorization and ritualized debate, and is invariably taught through the medium of the Tibetan language.

Each year an examination is held for those who have completed their studies. In it their performance is evaluated by the abbot of the particular college. The topics for their dialectical examination are drawn from the whole course of study and the topic to be debated is selected by the abbot on the spot, so that students have no chance to do specific preparation. Thus, it is a real test of a student's abilities and the depth of their study. At the conclusion the abbot assigns each candidate to a category of geshe according to their ability. There are four such categories, Dorampa, Lingtse, Tsorampa and Lharampa, Lharampa being the highest. After this, in order to qualify, the candidates are not allowed to miss even one of the three daily debate sessions during the subsequent eight months.

== See also ==
- Dialectics
- Gelongma

== Sources ==
- Adams, Miranda. "The Gelugpa Monastic Curriculum". The Treasury of Lives.
- Dreyfyus, George. "Tibetan Monastic Education". Tibetan and Himalayan Library. Tibetan and Himalayan Library.
- Liu Shengqi. "The Education System of Three Major Monasteries in Lhasa". China Tibetology. China Tibet Information Center. Archived from the original on 20 April 2015.
- The Government of Tibet in Exile
- "The Education System of Three Major Monasteries in Lhasa". zt.tibet.cn. Archived from the original on 2015-04-20.
