= Kadam (Tibetan Buddhism) =

10th–16th-century school of Tibetan Buddhism

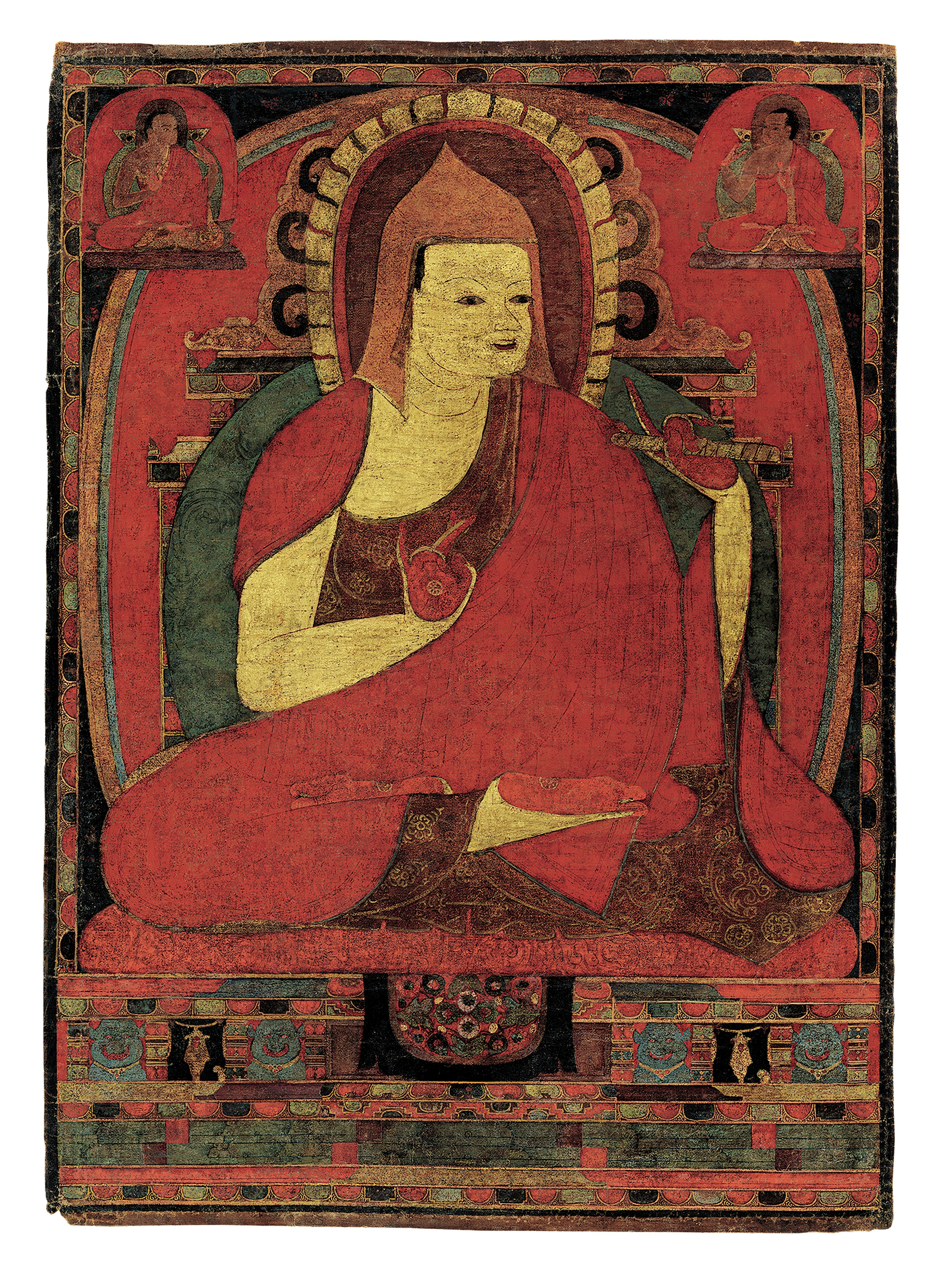
Tibetan Portrait of Atiśa

The Kadam school (Tibetan: བཀའ་གདམས་པ་, Wylie: bka' gdams pa) of Tibetan Buddhism, or Kadampa was an 11th century Buddhist tradition founded by the great Bengali master Atiśa (982–1054) and his students including Dromtön (1005–1064), a Tibetan Buddhist lay master. The Kadampa stressed compassion, pure discipline and study. By the 15th century, Tsongkapa is credited with synthesizing and folding Kadampa lineages into the Gelug school.

The most evident teachings of that tradition were the graduated teachings on the Mahayana path. These special presentations became known as lojong (mind training) and lamrim (stages of the path). Kadam masters like Atiśa also promoted the study of madhyamaka philosophy. According to Ronald M. Davidson, "Atiśa's coming to Tibet in 1042 was the threshold moment in the efflorescence of Buddhism and provided a stable foundation for monastic scholarship for the next thousand years."

With the rise of new Tibetan Buddhist schools like Sakya and Gelug, Kadam ceased to exist as an independent school, and its monasteries, lineages and traditions were absorbed into all major schools of Tibetan Buddhism. Because of this, Kadampa lineages remained strong long after the school disappeared.

== History of the Kadam tradition ==
The most important founding figure of the Kadam tradition is Atiśa Dīpankara Śrījñāna (982–1054), a Bengali Indian Buddhist master who was known as a great teacher at Vikramaśīla and traveled to Tibet in 1037 on the invitation of a princeling named Jangchub O. Atiśa's poem, the Lamp for the Path to Enlightenment (Bodhipathapradīpa; Tib. Byang chub lam sgron) was an influential text which laid out the stages of the path to Buddhahood. He also helped translate some texts into Tibetan, taught Buddhism and wrote on Vajrayana practice. Atiśa's main teaching focus was on presenting a comprehensive Buddhist Mahayana system, and his numerous works explain basic topics such as bodhicitta, the six perfections, the two truths, dependent origination, karma, and Madhyamaka philosophy.

Over time he drew several students around him, including the influential Dromtönpa Gyelwé Jungné, who convinced Atiśa to stay in Tibet indefinitely. This Buddhist circle was part of the "later diffusion" of Buddhism in Tibet. The tradition became known as Kadampa over time. The name means those who teach the Buddhist scriptures (bka) through personal instructions (gdams).

After the death of Atiśa in 1054, his main disciple Dromtön was the main leader of the Kadam tradition. He founded Radreng Monastery in 1056. Another important student was Ngog Legpai Sherab, he founded Sangpu Neutog in 1071. According to Sam Van Schaik, "both monasteries followed Atiśa's principle of combining tantric meditation practice with a firm adherence to the monastic code and with rigorous scholarship." Reting Monastery was located in Reting Tsangpo valley north of Lhasa. The nearby Phenpo Chu and Gyama Valleys were also home to many large Kadampa monasteries.

Dromtön's three main students were Po to ba Rin chen gsal (Potowa), Spyan mnga’ ba Tshul khrims ’bar (Chen Ngawa), and Bu chung ba Gzhon nu rgyal mtshan (Bu chungwa). From these three come the main teaching lineages of Kadam: (1) the authoritative treatises (gzhung) lineage, (2) the essential instruction (gdams ngag) lineage, and (3) the oral instruction (man ngag) lineage, respectively. These "three brothers" as they became known, traveled Central Tibet teaching and promoting the Kadampa order.

During the 11th and 12th centuries especially, the monastery at Sangpu became the dominant Kadampa institution, known for its scholarship. According to Van Schaik, "Sangpu became the centre of the renaissance in Tibetan Buddhist scholasticism." It maintained a curriculum which covered Prajñāpāramita, pramāṇa, vinaya and abhidharma. Another influential Kadam monastery for Buddhist scholarship was Narthang Monastery, which was established in 1153 by Tumtön Lodrö Drak (ca. 1106–66). According to Thupten Jinpa, these two scholastic centers "came to dominate the study of classical Indian Buddhist learning, especially in epistemology, abhidharma psychology and phenomenology, the scholastic inquiry into the perfection of wisdom literature, and the Middle Way philosophy of emptiness."

Due to influence and prominence of other Tibetan Buddhist schools like Sakya, Gelug and Kagyu, the Kadampa ceased to exist as an independent tradition by the end of the 16th century and their monasteries and lineages were absorbed into the other schools.

== Teachings and study ==
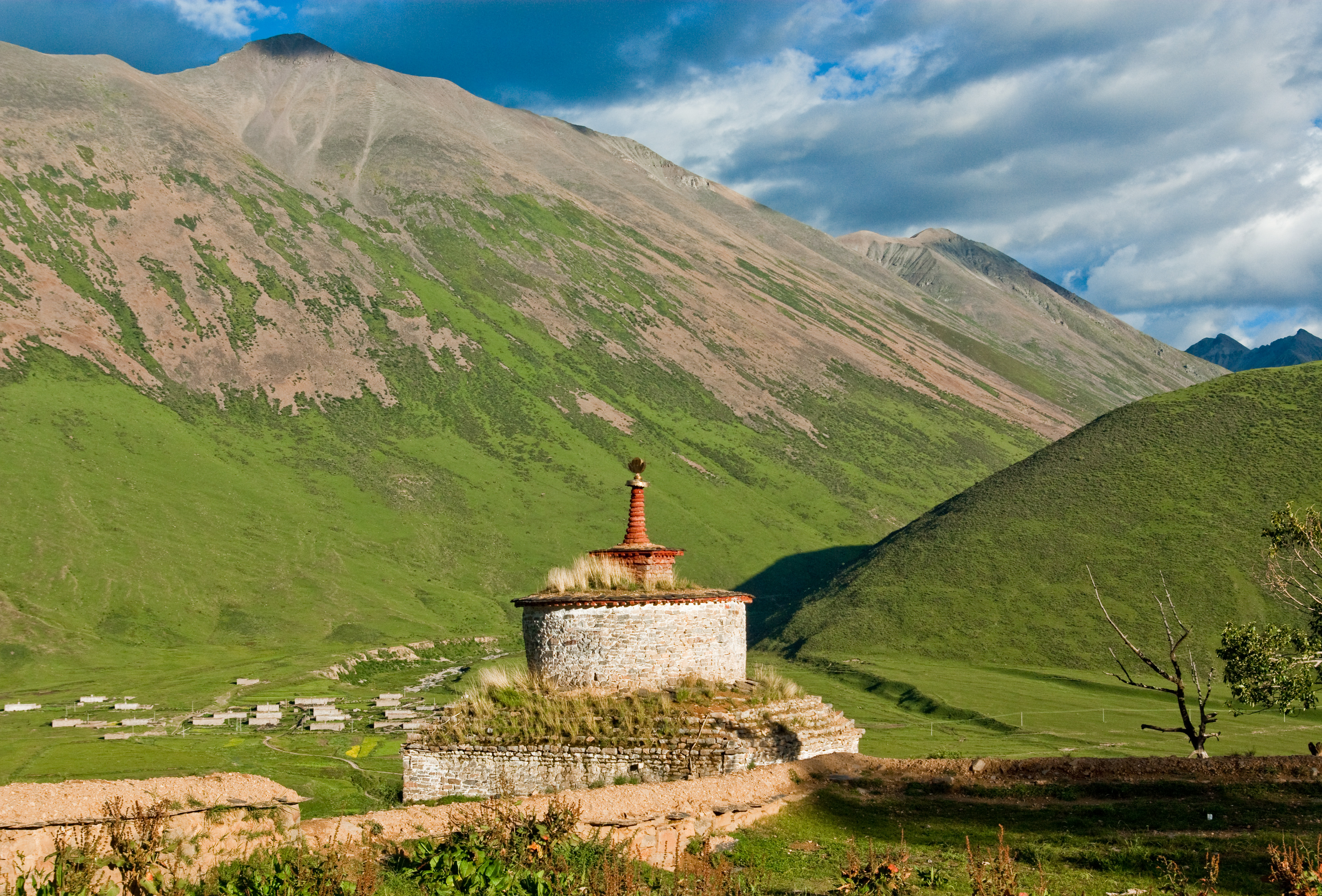
An old Stupa on Reting Monastery grounds

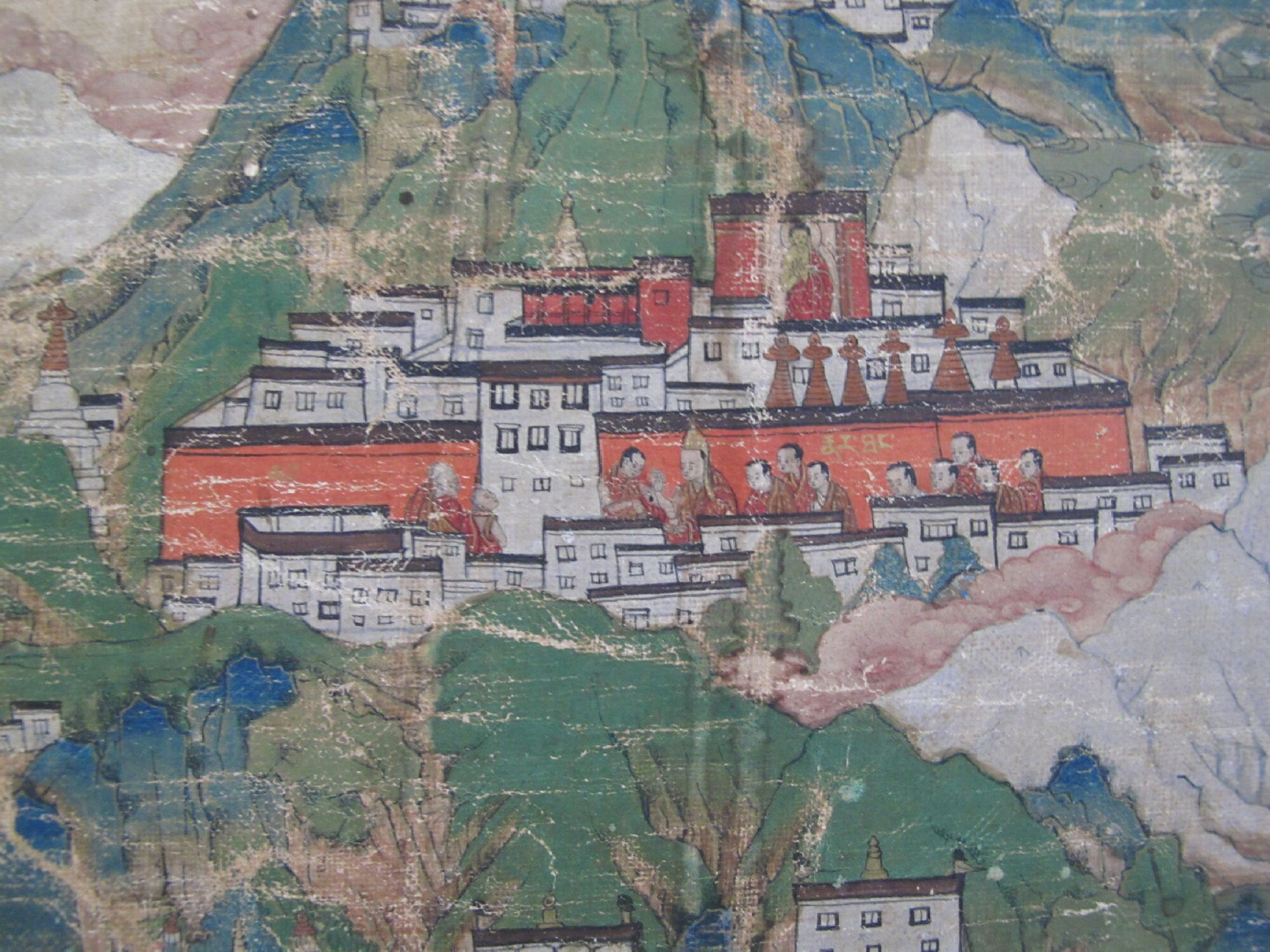
An illustration of Narthang monastery

=== Authoritative Treatises Lineage ===
The Authoritative Treatises lineage of Putowa Rinchensél (1031–1106) emphasized the close study of six classic Indian Buddhist texts:

1. Asaṅga's "Bodhisattvabhūmi", a section of his Yogācārabhūmi Śāstra
2. Maitreya-nātha's Mahāyāna-sūtrālamkāra-kārikā, a Yogacara work
3. Shantideva's Śikṣāsamuccaya
4. Shantideva's Bodhisattvacaryāvatāra
5. The Jātakamālā of Aryaśura
6. The Udānavarga

Furthermore, according to Thupten Jinpa, "the studies of these treatises are complemented with further Indian Buddhist classics like Nagarjuna’s (second century) Fundamental Wisdom of the Middle Way, his Seventy Stanzas on Emptiness, and Atiśa's Entry into the Two Truths and An Instruction on the Middle Way."

=== Scholarship ===
Atiśa was a follower of the Madhyamaka school and he introduced the complementary study of the works of Candrakīrti and Bhāviveka. Atiśa’s Madhyamaka philosophy was a synthesis which drew on the works of Bhāviveka and Candrakīrti. Atiśa taught Madhyamaka by using Bhāviveka's Tarkajvālā and Madhyamakaratnapradīpa as an introduction and then taught advanced students Candrakīrti’s Madhyamakāvatāra.

Later Kadampas (especially at Sangpu) continued the scholastic study of Indian Buddhist philosophy. At Sangpu, Kadampas also studied Indian Buddhist pramāṇavāda philosophers like Dharmakirti. However, unlike Dharmakirti and other Tibetan Buddhists who followed the Yogacara-Madhyamaka of Śāntarakṣita (725–788), the Kadampas (following Candrakirti) instead defended a form of realism regarding conventional truth. Thus they accepted the existence of external objects conventionally.

Kadam madhyamika philosopher-translators from Sangpu, like Ngog Loden Sherab (1059–1109) and Chaba Chokyi Senge (1109–1169) translated and produced works on madhyamaka and on epistemology (pramāṇa). These philosophical works were influential on later Tibetan Buddhist philosophy. Their work had a lasting impact on Tibetan Buddhist scholasticism and by the 12th century, their study curriculum had become part of mainstream Buddhist study in Central Tibet. It was also at Sangpu that Sonam Tsemo (1142–1182), one of the founders of the Sakya tradition, studied under Chapa Chokyi Senge.

Another important commentator on madhyamaka, Patsab Nyima Drakpa (1055–1145?), was also a Sangpu monastery monk who had studied in Kashmir as well. Patsab's commentary on Nagarjuna's Mūlamadhyamakakārikā seems to be the first Tibetan commentary on this work. His interpretation was based on Chandrakirti's method (which Patsab labeled thal 'gyur ba i.e. prāsaṅgika) and this differed from that of Ngog and Chaba's rang rgyud pa or svātantrika. One of Patsab's students, Mabja Changchub Tsöndrü, became known for his influential commentary on Nagarjuna's Mulamadhyamakakarika.

=== Oral transmissions and essential instructions ===
Two other important early Kadampa lineages were the Kadam oral transmissions (man ngag) lineage entrusted to Phu-chungwa Shönu Gyaltsen (1031–1106) and the Kadam essential instructions (gdams ngag) lineage obtained by Chengawa Tsültrim Bar (1033–1103). According to Jinpa "Chengawa’s Kadam lineage of essential instructions emphasizes an approach whereby Atiśa's essential instructions, rather than classical treatises, are the key basis for practice. These instructions include the guide on the four truths as transmitted through Chengawa, the guide on the two truths as transmitted through Naljorpa, and the guide on dependent origination as transmitted through Phuchungwa."

Phu-chungwa's oral transmission lineage focused on studying the teachings found in The Book of Kadam.

These instructions were passed down only to one student in each generation in a single transmission until the secrecy was lifted at the time of Narthang Shönu Lodrö. Later these teachings were incorporated into the Karma Kamtsang Kagyu lineage by Pal Tsuglak Trengwa and into the Gelug lineage by the 1st Dalai Lama.

=== Lamrim ===
The Kadam school was also known for their gradual step by step schema to the Mahayana Buddhist path, which are recorded in texts known as “steps of the path” (lam rim) or “stages of the doctrine” (bstan rim). They typically divided Buddhist practitioners into three types, culminating with tantra and Buddhahood. Atiśa’s Bodhipathapradīpa is the locus classicus for this genre, other works include the “Short Treatises of Atiśa” (Jo bo’i chos chung). Many later Kadampas composed various works on the graduated path. These works usually begin with contemplations on the rarity of a human rebirth, impermanence, and karma.

This genre was extremely influential in Tibet, and all schools of Tibetan Buddhism eventually developed their own Lamrim texts based on Atiśa’s Bodhipathapradīpa, such as Gampopa's Jewel Ornament of Liberation and Tsongkhapa's three Lamrim works.

=== Lojong lineage ===
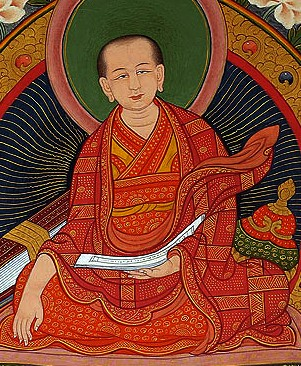
Chekawa Yeshe Dorje, a prolific author of Training the Mind in Seven Points which focuses on developing compassion and bodhicitta in one's life.

The Kadampa lineage was also known for an oral tradition called lojong ("mind training") which focused on developing bodhicitta through various contemplations and mental techniques, such as contemplatively taking all beings' suffering and giving them all of one's happiness (a meditation known as Tonglen). One of the earliest examples of a lojong text is Atiśa's Bodhisattva’s Jewel Garland.

Lojong teachings are also known as The Instructions for Training the Mind in the Mahayana Tradition (Wylie: theg chen blo sbyong). According to Gendun Druppa, Atiśa had received three lines of Lojong transmission, but there are conflicting accounts of from whom. It is agreed that he received teachings in Sumatra from Dharmakīrtiśrī (Wylie: gser gling pa), and sometimes as Dharmarakṣita. In the former case, Dharmarakṣita is identified as a scholar at the monastic university of Odantapuri. He is also known as the author of the Wheel of Sharp Weapons (Tib. blo-sbyong mtshon-cha 'khor-lo), another one of the earliest lojong works. The final main Lojong teacher was the Indian master Maitriyogi. Atiśa secretly transmitted them to his main disciple, Dromtön, who passed them on to figures like Potowa, who in turn transmitted the lineage to Sharawa (1070–1141).

During the time of the Three Noble Kadampa Brothers (Dromtön's main students), many of these oral teachings were collected together and compiled into the Lamrim. Yet at the time the lineages from Suvarṇadvipi Dharmakīrti were still kept secret. When the time was sufficiently mature, the Lojong Teachings were publicly revealed. Kadam Lojong texts include Kham Lungpa's Eight Sessions for Training the Mind (Wylie: blo sbyong thun brgyad ma), Langri Tangpa's (1054–1123) Eight Verses for Training the Mind (Wylie: blo sbyong tshig brgyad ma), Sangye Gompa's A Public Explanation (Wylie: tshogs bshad ma) and Chekawa Yeshe Dorje's (1102–1176) Seven Points for Training the Mind (Wylie: blo sbyong don bdun ma).

From Khamlungpa, Langri Tangpa and Chekawa Yeshe Dorje onwards they became public and later they were integrated into all four Tibetan Buddhist Schools. (These Kadampa-Lojong texts were brought together into the anthology A Hundred Texts on Training the Mind (Wylie: blo byong brgya rtsa).

=== Tantric practice ===
The Kadam practiced Vajrayana Buddhism and thus included tantric practices in their tradition, which were considered as an advanced practice for those of higher aptitude. The Kadampa's higher yoga tantra practice was based on Guhyasamaja and Chakrasamvara. Meanwhile, Tibetan sources mention that Atiśa’s main meditation deities were Śākyamuni, Avalokiteśvara, Acala, and Tārā. The Kadam school also seems to have created their own tantric system called the “sixteen spheres” (thig le bcu drug), based on thousand-armed Avalokiteśvara as the central deity. This system is still practiced at Reting monastery.

=== Popular Buddhism ===
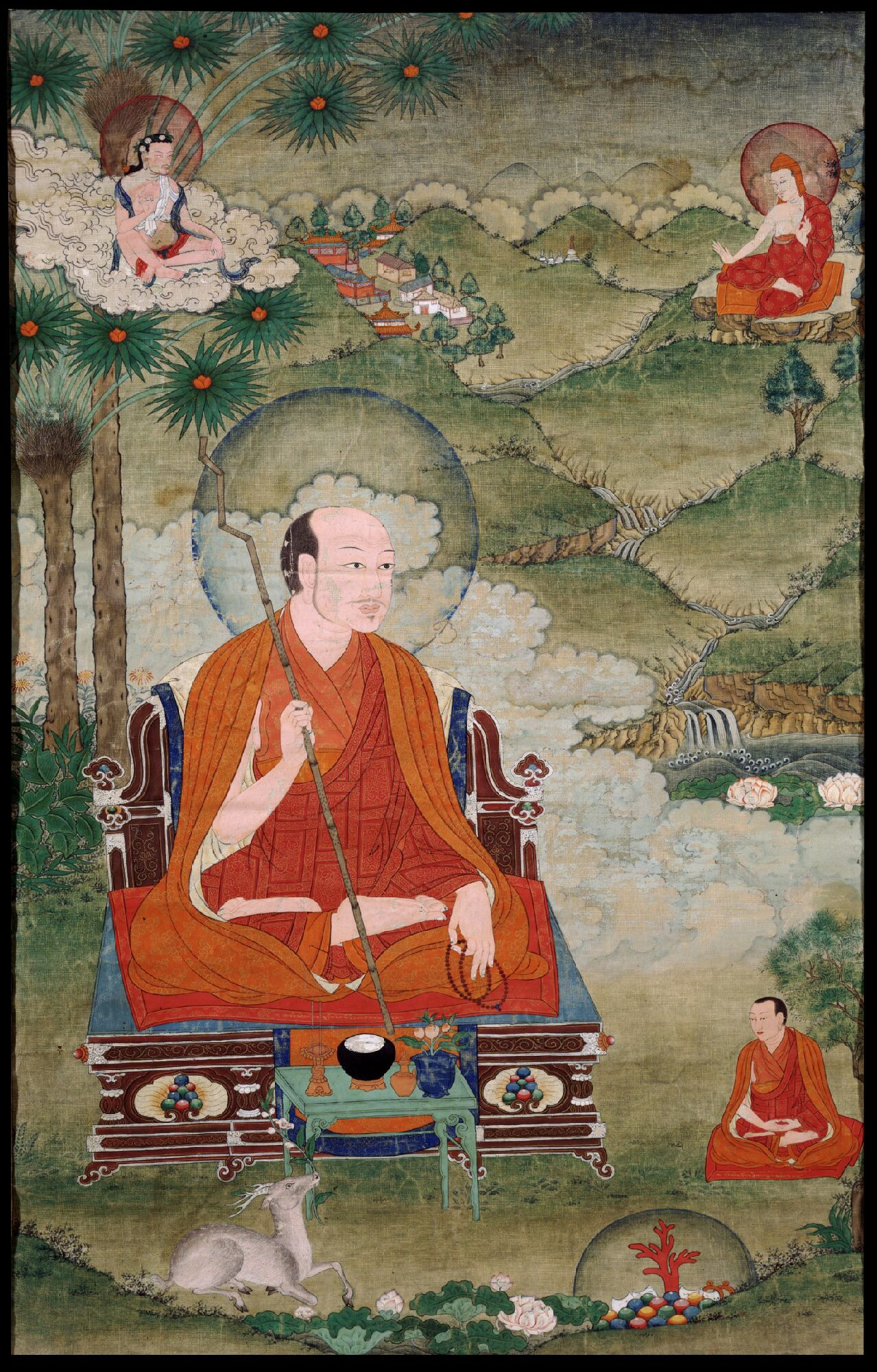
Potowa Rinchen Sel

According to Ronald M. Davidson, the Kadampa masters pioneered popular strategies for integrating the Tibetan laity into daily Buddhist activities. These included

the promotion of popular teaching methods, the development of the cults featuring loving Buddhist divinities (especially Avalokitesvara and Tara), the spread of artistic representations teaching these ideals at sites available to all, and the generation of easily memorized verses set to song.

Davidson further adds that the Kadampas promoted a more egalitarian ideal to counter "the elite bias of most forms of Buddhism spread throughout Tibet at the time". According to Davidson:

In their literature, they retain a teaching attributed to Atisa, that monks "from this day forward, pay no attention to names, pay no attention to clans, but with compassion and loving kindness always meditate on the thought of awakening (bodhicitta)". This ideal was widespread throughout Indian Buddhism and given lip service in eleventh-century Tibet, but its implementation meant a fundamental change of pedagogical method, for monks would have to deliver Buddhist ideas to the populace. Eventually the change was effected by Chennga and Potoba, who devised a style of teaching that included popular images and anecdotes in their presentations.

Potoba (Putowa) in particular was known for being attentive to popular expressions and made use of stories and illustrative examples in his teaching which appealed to a mass audience. Several hundred stories and anecdotes were collected in Potoba's Teaching by Examples. A Profusion of Gems (dPe chos rin chen spungs pa). Many of these examples remain in use today by Tibetan teachers.

Popular fasting programs (smyung gnas) based on Avalokitesvara was also introduced by Kadampas.

== The Gelug school, the "New Kadampa" ==
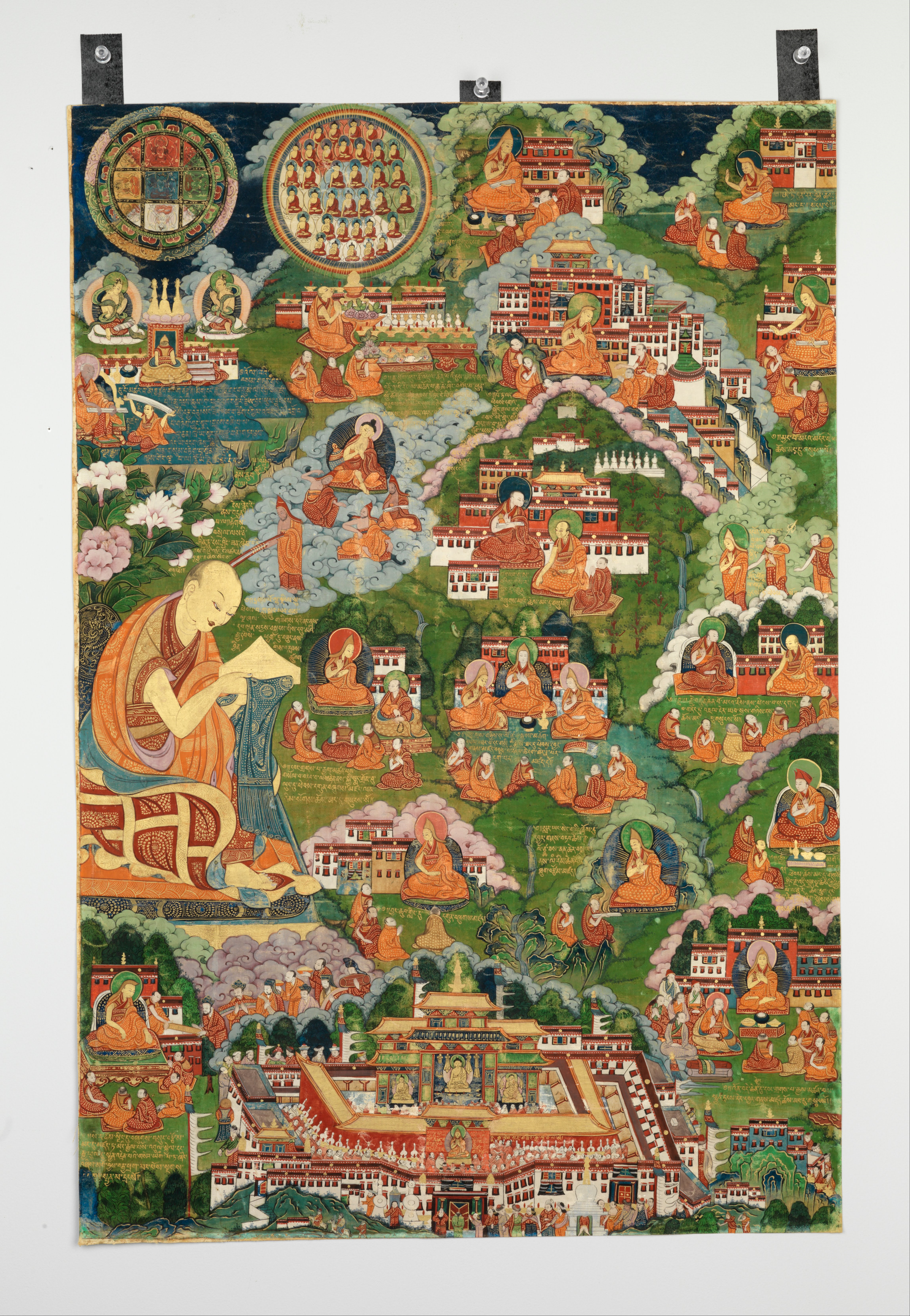
Painting depicting the life of Tsongkhapa, the largest image on the left showing the dream he had of the great Indian scholars like Buddhapalita.

Je Tsongkhapa, a Tibetan reformer, collected all the three Kadam lineages and integrated them, along with Sakya, Kagyu and other teachings into a new synthesis. The Kadampas that followed him were known as "New Kadampas" or, more commonly, as Gandenpas or "Gelugpas".

The three other Tibetan Buddhist schools (Nyingma, Sakya, Kagyu) also integrated the Lojong (Wylie: blo sbyong) teachings into their lineages. Gampopa (Wylie: sgam po pa), who studied for six years within the Kadam Tradition and became later the main disciple of Milarepa (Wylie: mi la ras pa), included the Lojong and Lamrim teachings in his lineage, the Karma Kagyu (Wylie: ka rma bka' brgyud).

Nowadays the Gelug tradition keeps and transmits the Kadam lineage of the Scriptural Traditions of the Six Canonical Texts. Together with Dagpo Kagyu Tradition they keep and transmit The Pith Instructions of the Sixteen Essences, and the Dagpo Kagyu Tradition keeps and transmits the Key Instructions of the Four Noble Truths.

One of the most important sayings of the Kadam masters is said to be

See harmony in all doctrines. Receive instructions from all teachings.

== The modern "New Kadampa Tradition" ==
In 1991, Kelsang Gyatso founded the "controversial" new religious movement he named the New Kadampa Tradition (NKT).

Centuries earlier, Je Tsongkhapa referred to his monastic order as "the New Kadam" before the term Gelug came into use, after his death.

The modern NKT-IKBU (International Kadampa Buddhist Union) explains that they are independent of other contemporary Tibetan Buddhist centers and Tibetan politics although they claim they are in the 'same tradition' as the Gelug. According to the NKT's own publicist, the purpose of using the term "New Kadampa Buddhism" to refer to their teachings is not to introduce confusion about their origins but to encourage students to emulate the purity and sincerity of the original Kadam school.

== See also ==
- Schools of Buddhism
