= Dromtön =

Tibetan Buddhist lama

Dromtönpa
- འབྲོམ་སྟོན་པ་རྒྱལ་བའི་འབྱུང་གནས་
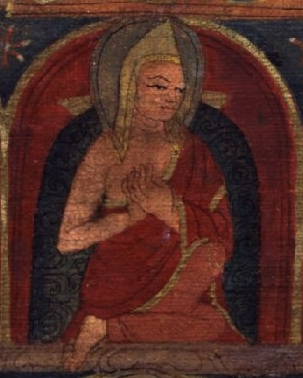

Personal life
- Born: Chos 'phel 1004 or 1005 Tolung
- Died: 1064 Reting Monastery
- Other name: Dromtön Gyelwé Jungné

Religious life
- Religion: Buddhism
- School: Initiator of the Kadam school
- Dharma name: Gyélwé Jungne
- Ordination: Lay vows with Snanam Rdorje Bbangphyug (976-1060); never ordained.

Senior posting
- Teacher: Chief disciple of Atiśa; Grum gyi Mkhanbu Chenpo Sebtsun; studied reading and writing with Paṇḍita Smṛti
- Post: Founded Reting Monastery, 1056
- Reincarnation: 45th incarnation of Avalokiteśvara
- Students: Chekawa Yeshe Dorje, g.Yungchosmgon, Potoba Rinchen Gsalphyogslas Rnamrgyal *1027-1105), Phuchungba Gzhonnu Rgyalmtshan (1031-1106) and Spyansnga Tshulkhrims ’bar (1038-1103)

Dromtön, Drom Tonpa or Dromtönpa Gyelwé Jungné (Tibetan: འབྲོམ་སྟོན་པ་རྒྱལ་བའི་འབྱུང་གནས་, 1004 or 1005–1064) was the chief disciple of the Buddhist master Atiśa, the initiator of the Kadam school of Tibetan Buddhism and the founder of Reting Monastery.

== Early life and education ==
Dromtönpa was born in Tolung, Tibet at the beginning of the period of the second propagation of Buddhism in Tibet. "His father was Kushen Yaksherpen (sku gshen yag gsher 'phen) and his mother was Kuoza Lenchikma (khu 'od bza' lan gcig ma)." His father's title skugshen indicates he was an important figure in the Bon tradition. He began preaching in Tibet in 1042.

== Career ==
Dromtön is considered to be the 45th incarnation of Avalokiteśvara, an important bodhisattva and thus a member of the early lineage of the Dalai Lamas (the First Dalai Lama is said to have been the 51st incarnation).

Dromtön founded Reting Monastery in 1056 in the Reting Tsampo Valley north of Lhasa which became the seat of the Kadampa lineage and brought some relics of Atisha there.

== Students ==
It was Dromtönpa's student Chekawa Yeshe Dorje who first compiled Atiśa's core teachings on the practice Lojong for developing of bodhicitta in written form, as The Seven Point Mind Training.
