= Faith in Nyingma Buddhist Dharma =

In the Nyingma Tibetan Buddhist Dharma teachings faith's essence is to make one's being, and perfect dharma, inseparable. The etymology is the aspiration to achieve one's goal. Faith's virtues are like a fertile field, a wishing gem, a king who enforces the law, someone who holds the carefulness stronghold, a boat on a great river and an escort in a dangerous place. Faith in karma causes temporary happiness in the higher realms. Faith is a mental state in the Abhidharma literature's fifty-one mental states. Perfect faith in the Buddha, his Teaching (Dharma) and the Order of his Disciples (Sangha) is comprehending these three jewels of refuge with serene joy based on conviction. The Tibetan word for faith is day-pa (Tib. དད་པ་གསུམ་, dépa sum; Wyl. dad pa gsum), which might be closer in meaning to confidence, or trust.

According to Chogyam Trungpa (1939 to 1987), faith means "accepting what is there" or "accepting what has been taught" unselfishly. It is feeling unshakably steady and confident as well as knowing what to cultivate and what to avoid. It means dedication to and conviction in one's own intelligence, which begins to manifest with one's guru, teacher, spiritual friend; this is awakened faith, real faith based on someone else acknowledging your existence. Genuine faith is without expectations, it is developed with renunciation. Emptiness is based on faith, with the idea of not getting anything in return. Right faith develops trust in all sentient beings who are worthy to be objects of compassion. Faith in knowing the right path based on actual experience, one has a sense of being with forward vision, it also involves delightfulness and the first perception.

In the Nyingma "Vast Expanse Heart Essence" preliminary teachings, teacher Patrul Rinpoche (1808–1887) has faith preceding refuge. It is the first step opening the refuge gateway to the three jewels of faith: Buddha, Dharma, and Sangha. It is also the first of the seven noble signs of wealth (faith with the six perfections). Having the ability to turn to the Dharma is the advantage of faith, among the five individual advantages. Lasting and stable faith is important and there are three main kinds: vivid faith, eager faith, and confident faith. A fourth to be aimed for is irreversible faith, when it becomes integral to the person and is refuge's cause, like a house's foundation serving the Dharma's three jewels. While lacking faith is one of the six stains in which the antidotes are the kinds of faith. Faith is a jewel that comes before all else blossoming in the heart's center. It is the essence of the Three Roots outer support power and it is Dharma's root.

For anyone, man or woman, who has faith in me, I, the Lotus Born, have never departed — I sleep on their threshold.

— Guru Rinpoche Padmasambhava

I am present in front of anyone who has faith in me, just as the moon casts its reflection, effortlessly, in any vessel filled with water.

— Guru Rinpoche Padmasambhava

What is faith? It is trust, longing, and clarity regarding the cause and result, truths and the Three Jewels.

— Abhidharma

== Nature, categories, forms and characteristics ==
There are seven parts to developing faith according to Dudjom Jigdral Yeshe Dorje's (1904 -1987) preliminary practices of the Profound and Secret Heart Essence of the Dakini. Faith's nature is in the root of every kind of virtuous practice. Its nature is a clear, untroubled mind, discriminating and aware of what should be adopted and avoided. Faith is the cause that gives rise to interest and happiness, it is an antidote to laziness. Intelligent faith and devotion brings trust when developed from shamatha, vipashyana and tonglen practice. In general, the sutra teachings speak of four faith types: inspired faith, aspiring faith, confident faith and irreversible faith.

=== Three categories ===
1. Vivid faith - A clear fresh feeling of joy and devotion untainted by guile.
2. Eager faith - Yearning to rid cyclic existence of suffering and to attain liberation and enlightenment. Comparable to the quest for riches.
3. Confident faith - Confident that cyclic existence is to be emptied and Dharma will not fail.

Cultivating firm faith through meditation on impermanence, and devotion to a teacher can lead to positive signs. It gives protection and clears away sufferings of cyclic existence as it is the first step on the path to liberation when aroused intensely with the determination to be free.

=== Six forms ===
According to the Nyingma school's Choying Tobden Dorje (1787–1848), the ennobling positive six forms of faith are:

1. Yearning faith stimulating renunciation of rebirth desire to attain awakening freedom. Arising from disillusionment from life's suffering.
2. Devoted faith leading to a dedication to supreme ideals. Arising from disillusionment from evil companion's behavior.
3. Respectful faith in body, speech, and mind with outstanding conscientiousness. Arising from disillusionment from life's appearances.
4. Lucid faith that uplifts the mind's positive qualities. Arising from contact with those who represent supreme ideals.
5. Trusting (confidence) faith that ends doubts concerning the teaching's base, path, and result. Arising from hearing of the principle of karma.
6. Certainty in faith toward the doctrine, leading to the application, reflecting, and meditating upon it. Arising from hearing and reflecting on Dharma.

=== Characteristics ===
Inspired faith is a sublime quality, indestructible, indomitable and an inexhaustible treasure of good qualities. People who have immutable faith in the three jewels are extremely rare and exalted, as the Sutra of the Precious Lamp points out its characteristics:

Faith gives birth to delight in the Buddha's Teaching, Faith points the way to the city of happiness and excellence, Faith banishes lack of opportunity, it is the best of all freedoms. Faith turns one from the path of demons, Faith is what makes one attain Buddhahood. Among the hosts of ordinary beings, Rare are those who have such faith in the Dharma.

— Sutra of the Precious Lamp

Unless we have faith, however many other good qualities we might have, they will not be of much use to us - as though we were very beautiful, but blind. So we have to make an effort to develop faith - by meditating on impermanence four times a day; by reflecting minutely on actions and their effects; by reflecting on the positive aspects of everything; by reflecting on how rare the Dharma is; by thinking of our teacher's kindness; by thinking of the excellent qualities of the Buddha. It is important to consider that other people - all of them - marvelous, and to be free of partiality and notions of high or low status, thus making a habit of faith and taming your own mind.

— from A Torch Lighting the Way to Freedom (back cover)

Faith is like a wheel, always ready to roll along the road; if you have it, you can make internal progress at any time. Faith is an inexhaustible treasure of good qualities. It is a vehicle carrying you along the path to omniscience, and outstretched hand drawing you to all good qualities. The extent to which spiritual qualities can be internalized depends on faith.

— Khetsun Sangpo, Tantric Practice in Nyingma (Snow Lion, 2000)

Reflective wisdom in Buddhism says beliefs should not be accepted with blind faith. Such means to consider the evidence of things, and irrefutable proof upon reflection on the intended meaning, so that a conclusion may arrive. Advanced meditation invites faith based on insight.

Reflecting on the Dharma's and the teacher's good qualities can remedy lack of faith. Ardent faith in the Dharma will arise by stressing lineage. Faith comes in the aftermath of doubt and vice versa but, in the end both are abandon. Single-pointed faith in your teacher can burn away ignorance and obscurations (temporary blindness), but if it is inadequate, you can be burned yourself. Bodhisattvas appear as spiritual friends to those with faith. Faith comes because the vajra master is capable of ransacking kleshas.

== Support power ==
Gyatrul Rinpoche (b. 1924), a Payul lineage mediator, in a commentary on the work of Chagmé (Wylie: Kar-ma Chags-med, fl. 17th century) says, faith power enables eliminating the two types of obscurations (i.e. conflicting emotions and obscuration concerning the knowable). Through the power of faith both ontological and phenomenological knowledge arises. Also, both the common and uncommon siddhis arise. He conveys the importance of faith for qualifying disciples who "listen" to the Dharma. This pertains to teaching Mahāyāna, Vajrayāna, and to Atiyoga in particular. Those without faith who are completely involved in the eight mundane concerns are not suitable vessels, and they should not be taught these kinds of Dharma.

Believing that the teacher knows best and arousing sublime bodhichitta is part of the inner power of support - faith, taking refuge and arousing bodhicitta - within the extraordinary or inner preliminaries of the Longchen Nyingthig Ngondro. Singular faith in the teacher seen as Buddha has greater benefit that the actual teaching.

Many factors may instill genuine faith, among these, four crucial circumstances are: 1) an authentic spiritual master attendance, 2) wholesome friends, 3) the three jewels and 4) reflection on existence's round of misery, according to Jigme Lingpa. Khenpo Namdrol says the bodhisattva on the accumulation path has faith and so with joining the five powers and five strengths In The Thirty-Seven Factors of Enlightenment, a commentary on the Rigdzin Dupa terma (The Gathering of the Vidyadharas revealed by Jigme Lingpa), which is an inner Guru Rinpoche ritual practice from the Longchen Nyingtik.

It is easier to have faith in religious instruction when it has a sense of the sacred. The thousand-petaled lotuses of faith and wisdom bloom. Signs that one is on the right track to accomplishment can be known through experiencing: faith, compassion and wisdom, automatically increasing, so that realization will come easily and few difficulties are experienced. Faith in mantra is more important that how it is pronounced.

Without faith in an afterlife, people may live lives deprived of ultimate meaning. Students who have emotional faith in the guru instead of understanding wisdom are not properly qualified to take teachings.

Enduring faith in the vinaya and the three baskets of the lamrim.

Rongzom Chokyi Zangpo states unequivocally that the Great Perfection can be penetrated with faith alone when being shown the nature of mind itself awakening (i.e. bodhicitta).

When the Buddha taught, he always began by introducing the wheel of faith, which opens the way to the Dharma, like the precious wheel of a universal ruler's power.

Faith and a strong determination to leave samsara develop in places that resemble where the Buddha gained enlightenment. Offering unceasing and unconquerable faith are the greatest offerings.
