= Lamrim =

Tibetan Buddhism textual form

Lamrim (Tibetan: ལམ་རིམ, Wylie: lam rim, "stages of the path") is a Tibetan Buddhist textual form for presenting the stages in the complete path to enlightenment as taught by Buddha. In Tibetan Buddhist history there have been many different versions of lamrim, presented by different teachers of the Nyingma, Kagyu and Gelug schools. However, all versions of the lamrim are elaborations of Atiśa's 11th-century root text A Lamp for the Path to Enlightenment (Bodhipathapradīpa).

== History ==
When Atiśa, the originator of the lamrim came from India to Tibet, he was asked by king Jang Chub Ö to give a complete and easily accessible summary of the doctrine in order to clarify wrong views, especially those resulting from apparent contradictions across the sutras and their commentaries. Based upon this request he wrote the Bodhipathapradīpa ("A Lamp for the Path to Awakening"), teaching what came to be known as the lamrim for the Tibetans. Atiśa's presentation of the doctrine later became known as the Kadampa tradition in Tibet.

According to Tsong Khapa, in his Lam Rim Chen Mo ("The Great Treatise on the Stages of the Path to Enlightenment"), Atiśa took the number and order of the subjects in Maitreya-natha and Asaṅgas Abhisamayalankara ("Ornament of clear realizations"), which was based on the wisdom sutras, as the basis to write the Bodhipathapradīpa. In the Abhisamayalankara they emphasised the hidden meanings of the sutras. Tibetan Buddhists thus believe that the teachings of the lamrim are based on the sutras that the Buddha taught and therefore contains the essential points of all sutra teachings in their logical order for practice.

Gampopa, a Kadampa monk and student of the famed yogi Milarepa, introduced the lamrim to his disciples as a way of developing the mind gradually. His exposition of lamrim is known in English translation as "The Jewel Ornament of Liberation" and is studied to this day in the various Kagyu schools of Tibetan Buddhism.

The main Lam Rim text in the Nyingma tradition is Longchen Rabjampa's Finding Rest in the Nature of Mind, along with its voluminous auto-commentary, The Great Chariot. Both lay out the entire scope of the buddhist teachings according to the view of the Nyingma school, from the foundational practices through to Dzogchen.

Tsongkhapa, founder of the Gelug school which is primarily based on Atiśa's Kadampa school, wrote one of his masterpieces on lamrim: The Great Treatise on the Stages of the Path of Enlightenment (Tib. Lam-rim Chen-mo) which has about 1000 pages, and is primarily based on literary sources. There is also a medium-length lamrim text by Tsongkhapa (200 pages) and a short one, called Lam-rim Dü-dön (Tib.), which is recited daily by many Gelugpas and is about 10 pages long. (Note: See The Abbreviated Points of the Graded Path)

The Lamrim was the first Tibetan text translated into a European language by Ippolito Desideri, a Jesuit missionary, who visited Tibet and made an extensive study of Tibetan Buddhism from 1716 to 1721. Desideri studied the Lam Rim Chen Mo of Tsongkhapa, and his manuscript describing Tibet was one of the most extensive and accurate accounts of Buddhist philosophy until the twentieth century.

== Philosophy ==
=== Three kinds of motivation ===
The starting point of the lamrim is a division of Buddhist practitioners into beings of three scopes, based upon the motivation of their religious activity. Disregarded in this division are individuals whose motives revolve around benefits in their current life. Striving for a favorable rebirth is implicitly the minimum requirement for an activity or practice to be classified as spiritual.

Atiśa wrote in "Lamp of the Path" (verse 2) that one should understand that there are three kind of persons:

1. Persons of modest motive search for happiness within samsara; their motive is to achieve high rebirth. Buddhists traditionally consider that this domain includes followers of most non-Buddhist religions who strive for a rebirth in a heaven.
2. Persons of medium motive are searching for their own ultimate peace and abandoned worldly pleasure. This includes the paths of pratyekabuddhas and śravakabuddhas, which seek personal liberation alone, the traditional goal of Hīnayāna practice.
3. Persons of high motive, who, based on their insight of their own suffering, seek by all means to stop the suffering of all beings. This is the Mahāyāna Bodhisattva path of the samyaksaṃbuddhas, who practice the six Perfections.

One of the formulaic presentations of the Buddhist path in the Nikayas is anupubbikathā, "graduated talk" or "progressive instruction," in which the Buddha talks on generosity (dāna), virtue (sīla), heaven (sagga), danger of sensual pleasure (kāmānaṃ ādīnava) and renunciation (nekkhamma). When the listener is prepared by these topics, the Buddha then delivers "the teaching special to the Buddhas," the Four Noble Truths (cattāri ariya-saccāni), by which arises "the spotless immaculate vision of the Dhamma." In the Tibetan Lamrim teachings, the Bodhisattva-path, with its training of the six perfections, is added to this formula.

=== Subjects of the lamrim ===
Although lamrim texts cover much the same subject areas, subjects within them may be arranged in different ways. The lamrim of Atiśa starts with bodhicitta, the altruistic mind of enlightenment, followed by taking the bodhisattva vows. Gampopa's lamrim, however, starts with the Buddha-nature, followed by the preciousness of human rebirth. Tsongkhapa's texts start with reliance on a guru (Tib.: lama), followed by the preciousness of human rebirth, and continue with the paths of the modest, medium and high scopes. Longchenpa's lamrim begins with the four thoughts that turn the mind, and proceeds through to the two stages of vajrayana practice and dzogchen.

Gampopa, Tsongkhapa, Longchenpa, and others, expanded the short root-text of Atiśa into an extensive system to understand the entire Buddhist philosophy. In this way, subjects like karma, rebirth, Buddhist cosmology and the practice of meditation are gradually explained in logical order.

== Outline of topics ==
An example of the outline for lamrim teachings is that of Liberation in the Palm of your Hand by Pabongkhapa Déchen Nyingpo. An abbreviated and annotated outline follows to show the structure of this lamrim: (Note: For a more detailed outline, see the external link "Lam Rim: The gradual Path to Enlightenment, Venerable Thubten Chodron's online Lamrim Outline")

Introduction

- the identities and lineages of the authors of the lamrim (Shakyamuni Buddha, Atisha, Dromtoenpa, etc.), to establish the authenticity of the teaching
- the greatness of the lamrim itself, to gain respect for it
- the way the instructions are to be received and given
- the way the students are to be guided through the subjects. This fourth subject has two divisions:

- the way to rely on a spiritual guide
- the way to train your mind on the basis of the correct way to rely on the spiritual guide. This last heading contains the rest of the instructions under the headings:

- the way to encourage yourself to take the essence of this precious human rebirth
- the way to take the essence of this precious human rebirth (that is: training your mind in the paths of the three scopes included within the lamrim)

The path shared with persons who have the modest scope motivation

Striving for a rebirth in the upper realms:

- the reality that this life will end and that you will die
- the suffering in a rebirth in the lower realms (a rebirth as hell being, hungry ghost or animal, which you want to avoid)
- (so you) take refuge in the three Jewels: Buddha, Dharma and Sangha
- (and adjust your behavior of body, speech and mind according to the) law of cause and effect/ karma which will lead you to a favorable rebirth within cyclic existence in the human-, demigod-, or god realm.

The path shared with persons who have the medium scope motivation

Striving for liberation of cyclic existence. The training in the medium scope path will lead to the development of the wish to be liberated from all un-free rebirths in cyclic existence through the power of afflictive emotions and karma. It consists of:

- The Four Noble Truths:

- The truth of suffering (in cyclic existence in general, including the favorable rebirths)
- The truth of the causes of suffering (the afflictive emotions, especially ignorance)
- The truth of cessation (there is a state that is free of suffering and its origins)
- The truth of paths (the way to attain this state free of suffering and its causes by practicing ethics, concentration and wisdom)

- Another presentation of the middle scope subjects is the presentation of the 12 links of dependent arising

The path for persons who have the high scope motivation

Striving for complete buddhahood:

- Developing mind of enlightenment (bodhicitta), the wish to become a buddha for the welfare of all sentient beings:

- the advantages of the mind of enlightenment;
- the way to develop the mind of enlightenment
- the 7-point instruction in seeing all sentient beings as your mothers (from previous lives and contemplating their kindness towards you)
- the instruction on how to exchange your self-interest for others' interest (by looking at the drawbacks of self-cherishing and the advantages of cherishing others)

- the way to train your mind after developing the mind of enlightenment, by training the six perfections:

- training in the perfection of generosity
- training in the perfection of ethics
- training in the perfection of patience
- training in the perfection of joyful effort
- training in the perfection of concentration
- training in the perfection of wisdom

== Gelug Lamrim tradition ==
The study of Lamrim is a major focus of the Gelug school and numerous Gelug figures wrote Lamrim works. A collection of important Lamrim works is known as the Eight Great Commentaries (on Atisha's Lamp for the Path to Enlightenment). The 14th Dalai Lama frequently teaches on these works. These are:

1. The Great Treatise on the Stages of the Path to Enlightenment (lam rim chen mo) by Je Tsong Khapa
2. The Medium Treatise on the Stages of the Path to Enlightenment (lam rim ‘bring po) by Je Tsong Khapa
3. The Concise Treatise on the Stages of the Path to Enlightenment (lam rim bsdus don) also known as Song of the Stages of the Path (lam rim nyams mgur) by Je Tsong Khapa
4. The Essence of Refined Gold – Stages of the Path to Enlightenment (lam rim gser zhun ma) by His Holiness the Third Dalai Lama, Sonam Gyatso.
5. The Easy Path – Stages of the Path to Enlightenment (lam rim bde lam) by Panchen Lobsang Chokyi Gyaltsen.
6. The Sacred Words of Manjushri – Stages of the Path to Enlightenment (lam rim ‘jam dpal zhal lung) by the Fifth Dalai Lama, Lobsang Gyatso
7. The Swift Path – Stages of the Path to Enlightenment (lam rim myur lam) by Panchen Lobsang Yeshe
8. Essence of Fine Speech – Stages of the Path to Enlightenment (lam rim legs gsung nying khu) by Ngawang Drakpa of Dagpo

== Lamrim texts in English ==
=== Classical Lamrim books (in historical order) ===
- Dipamkarashrijnana, Atisha. "The Lamp for the Path to Enlightenment" (PDF). Snow Lion Publications.
- Atisha's Lamp for the Path to Enlightenment by Geshe Sonam Rinchen, Snow Lion Publications
- The Jewel Ornament of Liberation by Gampopa, translated and annotated by Herbert V. Guenther (1986). Shambala Publications, ISBN 0-87773-378-3 (pbk)
- The Jewel Ornament of Liberation by Gampopa, translated by Khenpo Konchog Gyaltsen Rinpoche (1998). Snow Lion Publications – Ithaca, New York, with a foreword by The Dalai Lama, ISBN 1-55939-092-1.
- Engaging by Stages in the Teachings of the Buddha, 2 vols., by Phagmodrupa (Gampopa's disciple), Otter Verlag, Munich
- Longchen Rabjam, Finding Rest in the Nature of Mind, Padmakara Translation Group (Boston: Shambhala, 2017)
  - Finding Rest in the Nature of Mind (sems nyid ngal gso), is a complete lam rim in 13 chapters written in verse form. It covers the ground, path, and fruition as well as the view, meditation and conduct according to the Nyingma school, beginning from the foundational four reflections that turn the mind through to the two stages of vajrayana practice and the view and practice of dzogchen, blending the sutra presentation of buddha nature with the tantric view of the luminous, empty, spontaneously present primordial ground of pristine awareness. Longchenpa composed three auto-commentaries on the root text: one short, one extensive, and one which lays out the practice instructions:
    - The short auto-commentary: Garland of White Lotuses (Tib. padma dkar po’i phreng ba).
    - The extensive auto-commentary: The Great Chariot (Tib. shing rta chen po)
      - The Great Chariot is currently (as of 2022) in preparation for publishing by the Library of Tibetan Classics, translated by Ives Waldo. The digital version of the translation in progress is available online at Wisdomlib. The Library of Tibetan Classics, under the direction of Geshe Thupten Jinpa, PhD., has prepared a critical edition of the Tibetan text.
    - The practice instructions: The Excellent Path to Enlightenment (Tib. byang chub lam bzang), Khenpo Gawang Rinpoche and Gerry Winer (translators), Jewelled Lotus, 2014.
- The Great Treatise on the Stages of the Path to Enlightenment
  - Tsong-kha-pa (2000). Joshua Cutler; Guy Newland (eds.). The Great Treatise on the Stages of the Path to Enlightenment, Volume I. Translated by Lamrim Chenmo Translation Committee. Canada: Snow Lion. ISBN 1-55939-152-9.
  - Tsong-kha-pa (2002). Joshua Cutler; Guy Newland (eds.). The Great Treatise on the Stages of the Path to Enlightenment, Volume II. Translated by Lamrim Chenmo Translation Committee. Canada: Snow Lion. ISBN 1-55939-168-5.
  - Tsong-kha-pa (2004). Joshua Cutler; Guy Newland (eds.). The Great Treatise on the Stages of the Path to Enlightenment, Volume III. Translated by Lamrim Chenmo Translation Committee. Canada: Snow Lion. ISBN 1-55939-166-9.
- Sonam Gyatso (bSod Nams rGya mTso, the third Dalai Lama), Lam rim gser zhun ma. English translation by Glenn H. Mullin; 1st edition titled Essence of Refined Gold by the Third Dalai Lama: with related texts by the Second and Seventh Dalai Lamas (Dharamsala, HP, India: Tushita Books, 1978); 2nd edition titled Selected Works of the Dalai Lama III: Essence of Refined Gold (Ithaca, New York: Snow Lion, 1985).
- Pabongkha Déchen Nyingpo (2006). Trijang Rinpoche (ed.). Liberation in the Palm of Your Hand, A Concise Discourse on the Path to Enlightenment. Michael Richards (translator) (3rd ed.). Somerville, Massachusetts: Wisdom. ISBN 0-86171-500-4.

=== Modern Lamrim books & commentaries ===
- Wake Up To Your Life: Discovering the Buddhist Path of Attention. Ken McLeod. HarperCollins. ISBN 978-0062516817
- Practicing the Path: A Commentary on the Lamrim Chenmo, Yangsi Rinpoche, Wisdom Publications, ISBN 0-86171-346-X
- Steps on the Path to Enlightenment, Volume 1: A Commentary on the Lamrim Chenmo, The Foundational Practices, by Geshe Lhundub Sopa, Wisdom Publications, ISBN 0-86171-303-6
- Steps on the Path to Enlightenment, Vol.2: Karma : A Commentary on the Lamrim Chenmo by Geshe Lhundub Sopa, Wisdom Publications, ISBN 0-86171-481-4
- Illuminating the Path to Enlightenment, TDL Publications, ISBN 0-9623421-6-5
- Joyful Path of Good Fortune: The Complete Buddhist Path to Enlightenment, Tharpa Publications (2nd. ed., 1995) ISBN 978-0-948006-46-3
- The New Meditation Handbook: Meditations to Make Our Life Happy and Meaningful, Tharpa Publications (2003) ISBN 978-0-9817277-1-4
- Path to Enlightenment in Tibetan Buddhism, Geshe Acharya Thubten Loden, Tushita Publications, ISBN 0-646-16500-3
- Meditations on the Path to Enlightenment, Geshe Acharya Thubten Loden, Tushita Publications, ISBN 0-646-27043-5
- Essence of the Path to Enlightenment, Geshe Acharya Thubten Loden, Tushita Publications, ISBN 0-646-34241-X
- Guided Meditations on The Stages of the Path, Thubten Chodron, Snow Lion Publications, ISBN 978-1-55939-281-5

== See also ==
- Lamdré
