= Reting Monastery =

Tibetan Buddhist monastery in Lhünzhub County, Tibet, China

Reting
- Tibetan transcription(s); Wylie transliteration: rwa sgreng gom pa Other transcriptions: Radreng
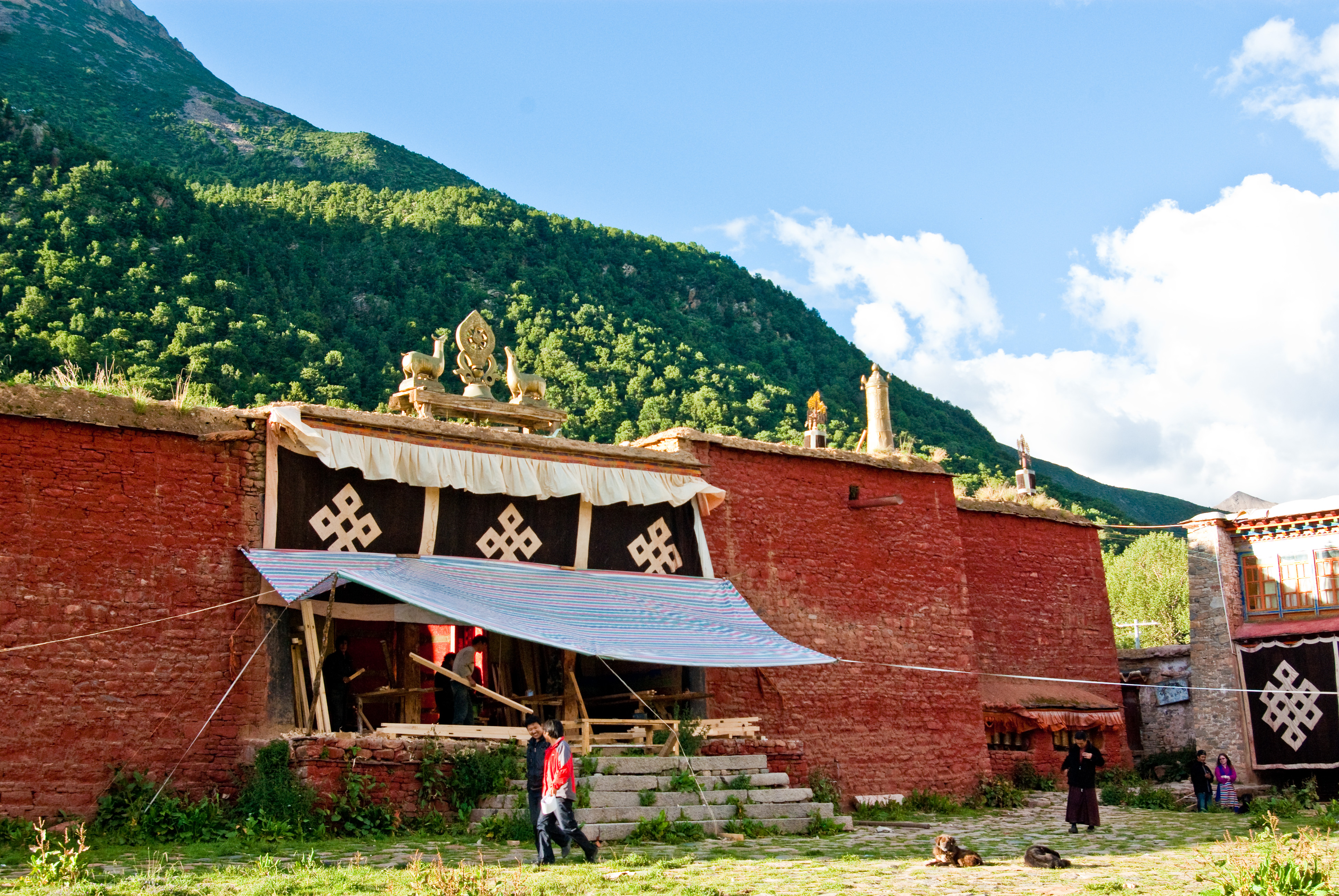

- Location within Tibet

Religion
- Affiliation: Tibetan Buddhism
- Sect: Gelug (formerly Kadam)

Location
- Location: Reting Tsampo Valley, north of Lhasa, Lhünzhub County
- Country: Tibet
- Interactive map of Reting
- Coordinates: 30°18′36″N 91°30′47″E

Architecture
- Founder: Dromtön
- Completed: 1057; 969 years ago

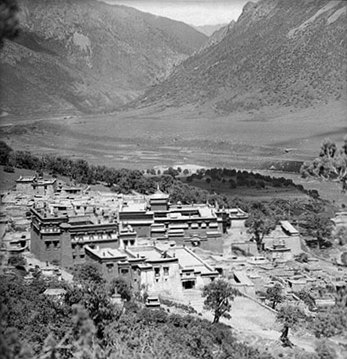
Reting Monastery in 1950 before its destruction. The main temple and assembly hall are in the centre of the complex topped by a gilded roof. Photo taken by Hugh Edward Richardson.

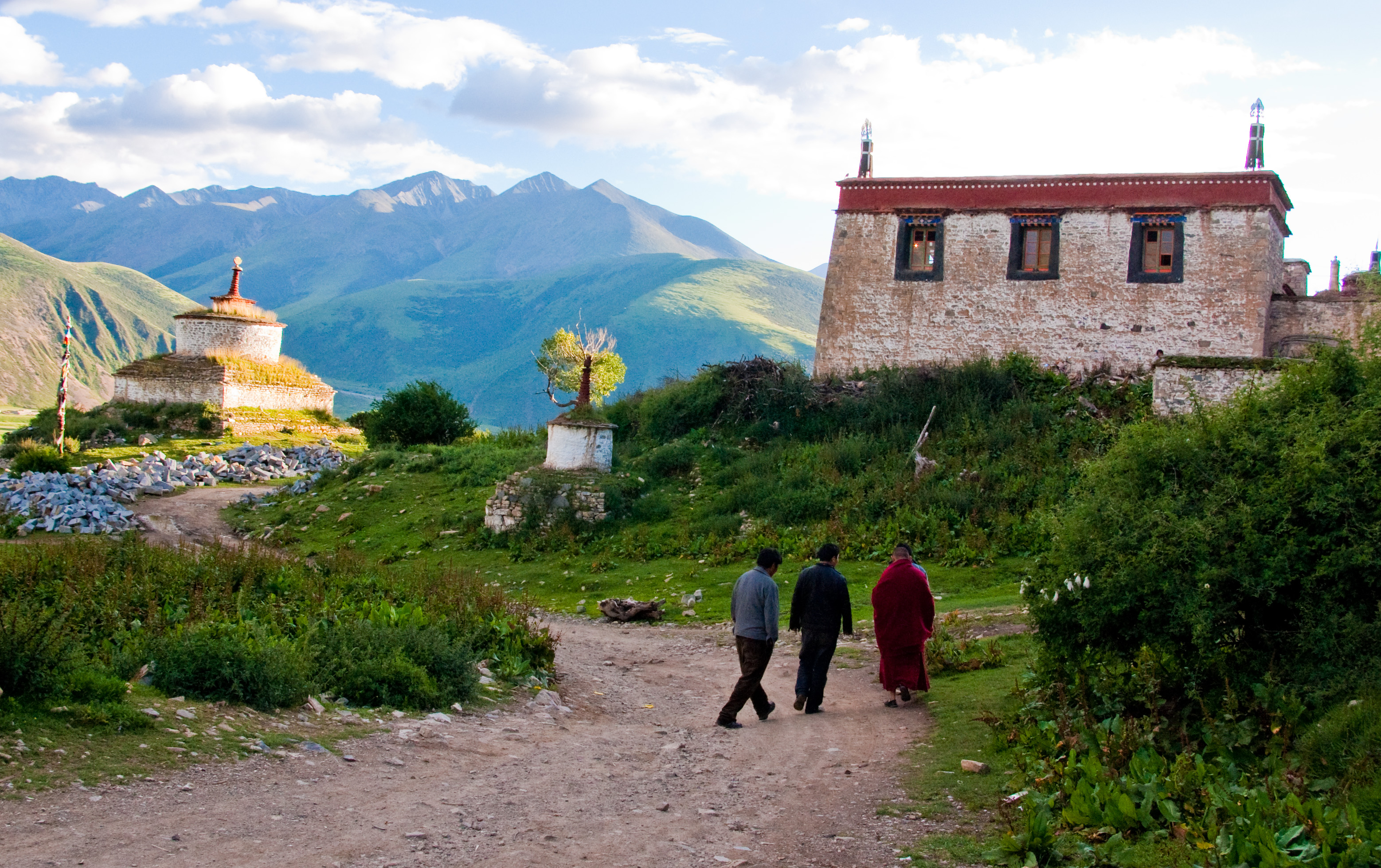
Reting Monastery in 2009

Reting Monastery (Wylie: rwa sgreng gom pa) is an historically important Buddhist monastery in Lhünzhub County in Lhasa, Ü-Tsang, Tibet. It is also commonly spelled "Radreng."

== History ==
Reting Monastery was founded by Atiśa's chief disciple Dromtön in 1057 in the Reting Tsangpo Valley north of Lhasa as the seat of the Kadam lineage of Tibetan Buddhism. He brought some of Atiśa's relics with him. It was the first major monastery of the Sarma revival.

Je Tsongkhapa (1357–1419) reformed the Kadam, which then became known as the Gelug lineage and Reting became an important Gelug monastery, the seat of the Reting Rinpoche.

The Reting Rinpoches were responsible for the successful search and discovery of the 14th Dalai Lama. The Reting Rinpoches were among the candidates for Regent during the minority of a Dalai Lama. Thus, the Reting Rinpoche was Regent between 1845 and 1855 and, again, from 1933-1947. The latter Regent, the Fifth Reting Rinpoche, was involved in the search for the present Dalai Lama and became his Senior Tutor, later abdicated his position and was found guilty of colluding with the Chinese and died in a Tibetan prison in 1947. They also destroyed the Gelug Reting Monastery and killed many in Lhasa. The political confusion which followed aided the rapid collapse of Tibet after the Chinese invaded.

The Sixth Reting Rinpoche died in 1997. The Chinese announced in January 2001 that a new incarnation had been chosen as the Seventh Reting Rinpoche, just two days after the Karmapa began his flight to India. This incarnation has not been recognised by the Dalai Lama who believes he is a pawn in the attempt by the Chinese to control the Buddhist religion in Tibet.

Reting was devastated by the Red Guards during the Cultural Revolution, and has only been partially restored.
