= Kelsang Wangmo =

German Buddhist nun and first woman to receive the Geshe degree

- Title: Geshe (Geshema)

Personal life
- Born: Kerstin Brummenbaum; 1971 (age 54–55) Lohmar, Germany
- Known for: First woman to receive the Geshe degree
- Occupation: Buddhist nun, scholar, teacher

Religious life
- Religion: Tibetan Buddhism
- School: Gelug

Senior posting
- Based in: Dharamshala, India

Geshe Kelsang Wangmo (born 1971) is a German-born Buddhist nun, scholar, and teacher in the Gelug school of Tibetan Buddhism. She is the first woman to be awarded the Geshe degree, the highest academic qualification in the Tibetan monastic system, often compared to a doctorate in Buddhist philosophy.

== Early life ==
Kelsang Wangmo was born as Kerstin Brummenbaum in Lohmar, Germany, and was raised in a Roman Catholic family. During her teenage years, she became disinterested in religion. After completing high school in 1989, she travelled across parts of the Middle East and Asia, including Israel, Turkey, Thailand, Indonesia, and Japan.

Her journey eventually brought her to India, where she visited Kolkata, Varanasi, and Manali, before arriving in Dharamshala. She had initially planned to return to Germany to study medicine but chose instead to remain after encountering Tibetan Buddhism.

== Conversion and ordination ==
Wangmo began studying Buddhism at the Tushita Meditation Centre in Dharamkot, attending introductory courses and teachings by Tibetan lamas.

She was ordained as a nun in April 1991 and committed to long-term monastic study.

== Monastic education ==
Wangmo studied at the Institute of Buddhist Dialectics (IBD) in Dharamshala, undertaking the traditional geshe curriculum lasting approximately 17 years.

Her studies included:

- Buddhist logic (pramāṇa)
- Madhyamaka philosophy
- Prajñāpāramitā
- Abhidharma
- Vinaya

The program required memorization, formal debate, and annual examinations. She completed her thesis in Tibetan in 2009.

At the time, women were not permitted to take the final Geshe examinations held in monasteries such as Drepung Loseling.

== Geshe degree ==
In April 2011, the Institute of Buddhist Dialectics awarded Wangmo the degree of Geshe, making her the first woman to receive the title.

Her achievement followed reforms supported by the Dalai Lama and Tibetan religious authorities that allowed women to complete the full course of study.

The Geshe degree represents the highest scholastic qualification in the Gelug tradition.

== Later developments ==
Wangmo’s achievement contributed to broader changes in Tibetan Buddhist monastic education. After 2011, the title Geshema became formally established for nuns.

In 2016, the first group of Tibetan nuns received geshema degrees, and since then more than one hundred nuns have completed the program.

== Teaching ==
Since 2004, Wangmo has taught Buddhist philosophy in English in Dharamshala, following the Institute of Buddhist Dialectics curriculum.

She has also taught internationally and contributed to the transmission of Tibetan Buddhist philosophy to Western audiences.

== Legacy ==
Wangmo is regarded as a pioneering figure in contemporary Buddhism. Her attainment of the Geshe degree is considered a milestone in expanding educational opportunities for women in Tibetan Buddhism and reflects broader institutional reforms.
