= Bodhicitta =

Concept in Buddhism

Translations of bodhicitta
- English: enlightenment-mind
- Sanskrit: बोधिचित्त
- Chinese: 菩提心 (Pinyin: pútíxīn)
- Japanese: 菩提心 (Rōmaji: bodaishin)
- Khmer: ពោធិចិត្ត (UNGEGN: pothichet)
- Korean: 보리심 (RR: borisim)
- Tibetan: བྱང་ཆུབ་ཀྱི་སེམས (byang chub kyi sems)
- Thai: โพธิจิต (RTGS: photichit)
- Vietnamese: Bồ-đề tâm 菩提心

In Mahayana Buddhism, bodhicitta (Note: For definitions of the components of the term see Wiktionary: bodhi and citta.) ("aspiration to enlightenment" or "the thought of awakening") is the mind (citta) that is aimed at awakening (bodhi) through wisdom and compassion for the benefit of all sentient beings.

Bodhicitta is the defining quality of the Mahayana bodhisattva (a being striving towards Buddhahood) and the act of giving rise to bodhicitta (bodhicittotpāda) is what makes a bodhisattva a bodhisattva. Bodhicitta is the generative cause of a bodhisattva's eventual Buddhahood. The Daśabhūmika Sūtra explains that the arising of bodhicitta is the first step in the bodhisattva's career.

== Etymology ==
Etymologically, the word is a combination of the Sanskrit words bodhi and citta. Bodhi means "awakening" or "enlightenment". Citta derives from the Sanskrit root cit, and means "that which is conscious" (i.e., mind or consciousness). Bodhicitta may be translated as "awakening mind" or "mind of enlightenment". It is also sometimes translated as "the thought of enlightenment."

== Definition ==
=== Indian sources ===
The term bodhicitta is defined and explained in different ways by different Mahayana Buddhist sources. According to Paul Williams, the basic meaning of bodhicitta in Indian sources (such as Atisha's Bodhipathapradipa) is the lofty motivation to "strive to bring a complete end to all the sufferings of others along with their own suffering...This bodhicitta results from deep compassion (karuna) for the suffering of others."

According to the Bodhisattvabhumi, the bodhisattva who gives rise to bodhicitta thinks thus:

O may I obtain supreme and perfect Enlightenment, promote the good of all beings, and establish them in the final and complete nirvana and in the Buddha-knowledge!

Thus, according to the Bodhisattvabhumi, bodhicitta has two objects of thought or themes (alambana): bodhi and the good of the living beings (sattv-ārtha).

Similarly, in the Ornament of Realization (Abhisamayālaṁkāra), bodhicitta is defined as follows:

The arising of the mind [of awakening] is a desire for perfect, complete Bodhi, for the sake of others (Skt. cittotpādaḥ parārthāya samyaksambodhikāmatā)

According to Indian sources, the bodhicitta aspiration provides incalculable merit (such as good rebirths, a weakening of the defilements, increased mindfulness and luck). Bodhicitta is what makes someone a Mahayana bodhisattva, a child of the Buddha. Thus, the Indian Buddhist author Shantideva (8th century) writes in his Bodhicaryavatara:

Those who long to transcend the hundreds of miseries of existence, who long to relieve creatures of their sorrows, who long to enjoy many hundreds of joys, must never abandon bodhicitta. When bodhicitta has arisen in him, a wretch, captive in the prison of existence, he is straightway hailed son of the Sugatas [the Buddhas], to be revered in the worlds of gods and men.

According to Paul Williams, bodhicitta in early Mahāyāna works was less well defined and meant a "certain state of mind" characteristic of a bodhisattva.

The cultivation of bodhicitta plays a significant role in Mahāyāna liturgies, particularly in ceremonies where one takes the bodhisattva precepts. Within these texts, two distinct types of bodhicitta are identified. The first, known as "conventional bodhicitta" (samvrti), refers to the mental aspiration of a bodhisattva to attain enlightenment, as previously explained. The second, called "ultimate bodhicitta" (paramartha), denotes a mind that directly perceives either emptiness or the inherent enlightenment / buddha-nature within the mind itself.

Regarding the second aspect, some Mahayana sources discuss bodhicitta not as something that must be generated, but as something which is latent in all beings, something that is already there. This is linked to the idea of the inherently pure luminous mind (prakrtipariśuddhacitta). Thus, the Vairocanābhisaṃbodhi-sūtra states: "Knowing one's own mind according to reality is BODHI, and bodhicitta is the innately pure mind that is originally existent."

=== Modern definitions ===
According to the 14th Dalai Lama, bodhicitta is:

the aspiration to bring about the welfare of all sentient beings and to attain buddhahood for their sake - is really the distilled essence, the squeeze juice, of all the Buddha's teachings, because ultimately, the Buddha's intention is to lead all sentient beings to perfect enlightenment.

Some modern East Asian authors on Buddhism, such as D.T. Suzuki and M. Anesaki, define bodhicitta as an immanent inner awakening. For example, Anesaki writes that bodhicitta is "the primordial essence of our mind, which in itself consists in the supreme bodhi."

According to Zoketsu Norman Fischer, bodhicitta is a spontaneous wish to attain enlightenment motivated by great compassion for all sentient beings, accompanied by a falling away of the attachment to the illusion of an inherently existing self.

Fischer adds that bodhicitta, along with the mind of great compassion (mahakaruna), motivates one to attain enlightenment Buddhahood, as quickly as possible and benefit infinite sentient beings through their emanations and other skillful means. Bodhicitta is a felt need to replace others' suffering with bliss. Since the ultimate end of suffering is nirvana, bodhicitta necessarily involves a motivation to help others to awaken (to find bodhi).

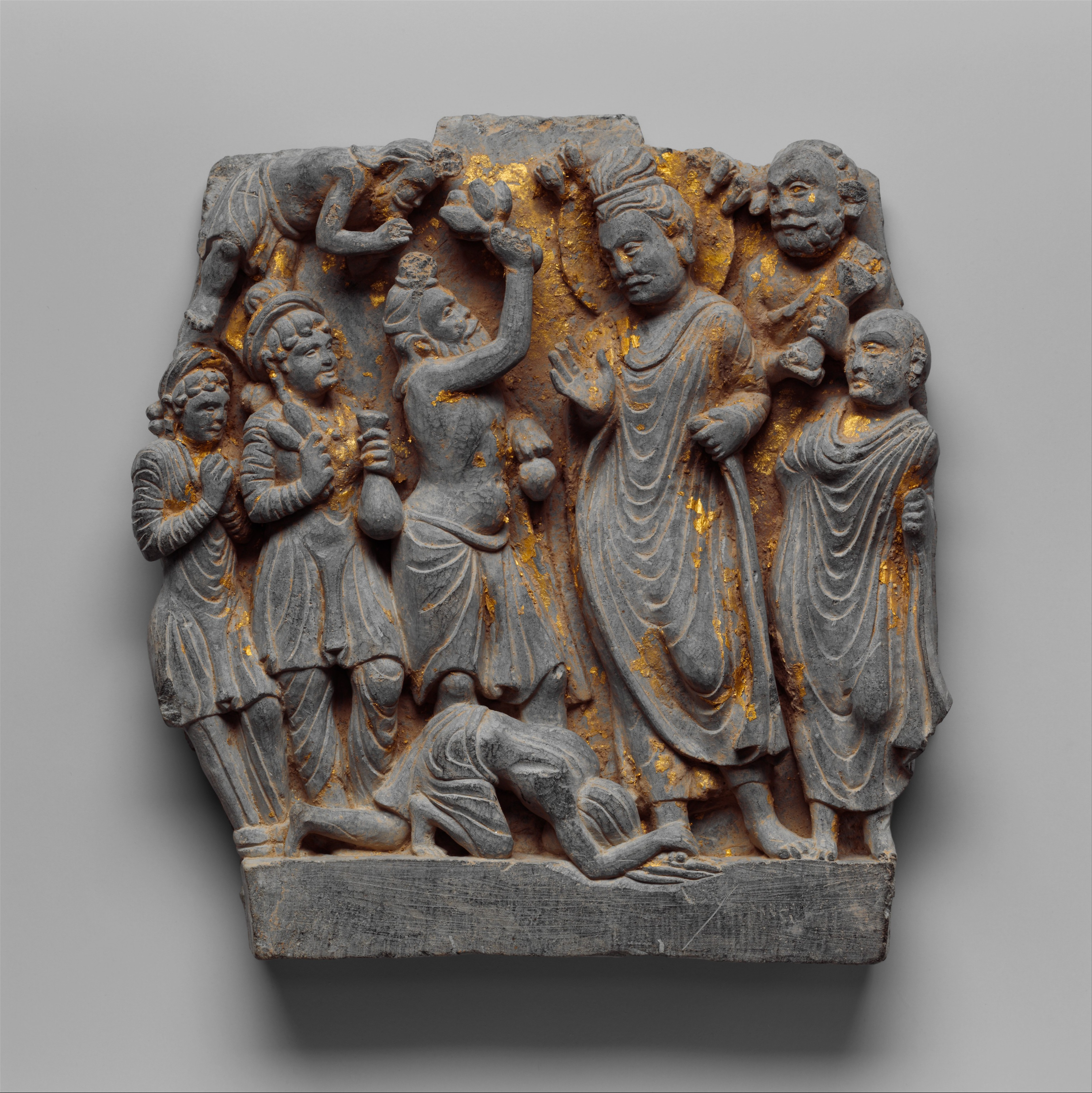
Gandharan relief depicting the ascetic Megha (Shakyamuni in a past life) prostrating before the past Buddha Dīpaṅkara and vowing to become a Buddha, c. 2nd century CE (Gandhara, Swat Valley)

== Types and stages of bodhicitta ==
=== Indian sources ===
Indian Mahayana sources also developed different models which described different forms and levels of bodhicitta.

According to the Bodhisattvabhumi, there are two main stages of the development of bodhicitta:

- a kind of bodhicitta which can be lost
- the permanent kind of bodhicitta which cannot be lost and leads directly to enlightenment.

Furthermore, according to Shantideva (and other sources), there are two types of bodhicitta from a practical perspective:

- bodhicitta which is a wish or aspiration (Sanskrit: bodhipranidhicitta or pranidhicittotpada), this is when a bodhisattva makes an aspiration or "bodhisattva vow" (bodhisattva praṇidhāna) to become a Buddha for the sake of all beings. This is compared to making the decision to start on a journey.
- active bodhicitta (bodhiprasthanacitta or prasthanacittotpada) which consists of actually practicing the path in line with one's intent, which like actually undertaking a journey

According to the Buddhāvataṃsaka Sūtra, there are also said to be three types of bodhicitta:

- herder bodhicitta, in which a bodhisattva strives to deliver beings to awakening first (like a herder lets all their sheep in the pen first)
- ferryman bodhicitta, in which they travel to and enter enlightenment together with the beings they are ferrying
- king-like bodhicitta, in which the bodhisattva reaches awakening first, and then helps others to reach that goal

=== In Tibetan Buddhism ===
A common Tibetan Buddhist distinction is that between relative and absolute (or ultimate) bodhicitta. Relative bodhicitta is a state of mind in which the practitioner works for the good of all beings as if it were their own. Absolute bodhicitta is the wisdom of shunyata (śunyatā, a Sanskrit term often translated as "emptiness", though the alternatives "vast expanse" or "openness" or "spaciousness" probably convey the idea better to Westerners).

In his book Words of My Perfect Teacher, the Tibetan Buddhist teacher Patrul Rinpoche describes the three degrees of bodhicitta as taught in the Avatamsaka Sutra, claiming that shepherd-like is best.

Some bodhicitta practices emphasize the absolute (e.g. vipaśyanā), while others emphasize the relative (e.g. metta), but both aspects are seen in all Mahāyāna practice as essential to enlightenment, especially in the Tibetan practices of tonglen and lojong. Without the absolute, the relative can degenerate into pity and sentimentality, whereas the absolute without the relative can lead to nihilism and lack of desire to engage other sentient beings for their benefit.

=== Chan Buddhism ===
Chan generally advocates for a direct approach which emphasizes sudden awakening. However, in the system of Guifeng Zongmi, in which sudden awakening is to be followed up by "gradual cultivation," sudden awakening entails a combination of both faith and bodhicitta. Jeffrey Broughton observes that Zongmi thus glosses the Chan idea of sudden awakening with traditional Mahāyāna terminology. As Zongmi states in relation to sudden awakening: "Produce compassion, wisdom, and the vow, resolving to seize awakening."

John McRae observes that the sermons of Shenhui, the famous Southern School proponent of sudden awakening from whom Zongmi claimed lineal descent, were aimed to open the audience up to moments of inspiration wherein they might generate bodhicitta. However, according to McRae, as no consideration was given to any practice of meditation after the initial experience of bodhicitta, Shenhui understood bodhicitta "in a manner that is virtually tantamount to the final achievement of enlightenment." Shenhui offers the following verses of adulation to bodhicitta, which he quotes from the Nirvāṇa Sūtra:

Although bodhicitta and the ultimate [realization] are no different,
Of the two [states of] mind, it is the first which is [more] difficult.
With oneself still unsaved, to first save others—
Thus do we reverence the initial [achievement of] bodhicitta.

By this initial bodhicitta one becomes a teacher of humans and gods,
Superior to the śrāvakas and pratyekabuddhas.
With such a bodhicitta, one transcends the triple realm,
Hence this is called the most insurpassable.

Other Chan sources may adopt a more radical posture. In the Long Scroll, the earliest known records of Chan, it is explained that giving rise to the thought of enlightenment and practice is a slow path. This is contrasted with taking mind itself as the path, which is described as quick and for those with sharp abilities. This text further states that, "The spontaneously peaceful mind does not realize the understanding of the Mahayana or the Hinayana," and as such "does not produce the thought of enlightenment."

In the same text, the iconoclastic Master Yuan also explained, "If you desire to cut off crafty artifice, don't produce the thought of enlightenment and don't use knowledge of the sutras and treatises. If you can accomplish this, then for the first time you will have bodily energy," and "If you do not raise the thought of enlightenment and do not seek insight and understanding, then you will exhaust both phenomena and principle." Similarly, Deshan Xuanjian, famously known for having burnt his sutra commentaries, also said, "those who have attained the three worthy states, those who have aroused bodhicitta, and those who have completed the ten stages are all ghosts guarding old graves. Can any of them save even himself?"

Additional Chan materials explain that the benefit of sentient beings is accomplished naturally and without any intention. For example, a Tibetan Chan text known as the Ratification, associated with the Chan master Heshang Moheyan, states that the benefit of beings is achieved without intention or analysis. The text goes on to cite the Tathāgatagūnācitya, explaining, "this is like the way the sun and moon shine on everything, a wish-fulfilling jewel produces anything, and the great earth gives rise to everything." Similarly, the Oxhead Chan text known as the Jueguan lun says:

Asked, "What is spoken of as compassion?"
Answered, "The body of transformation, free of discrimination, completely agrees with true Voidness. Its affection toward all living beings is free from intention. 'Compassion' is a name forced upon it."

== Cultivation ==
Mahāyāna Buddhist practice focuses on the Bodhisattva path, as this path begins with the arousing of bodhicitta. The arising of bodhicitta or the generation of it (as well as the mind generated in this process) is called bodhicittotpāda (Sanskrit; Chinese: 發菩提心, faputixin; Jp. hotsubodaishin; Tibetan: byang chub kyi sems bskyed pa), that is, the arising (utpāda) of bodhicitta.

Mahāyāna Buddhism teaches that the broader motivation of achieving one's own enlightenment "in order to help all sentient beings" is the best possible motivation one can have for any action, whether it be working in one's vocation, teaching others, or even making an incense offering. Thus, the bodhisattva's Six Perfections (Pāramitās) of Buddhism only become true "perfections" when they are done with the motivation of bodhicitta. This means that any act, such as the action of giving (Skt. dāna) can be done in a mundane sense, or it can be a pāramitā if it is conjoined with bodhicitta. Bodhicitta is the primary positive factor to be cultivated.

=== Practices ===
The Mahāyāna tradition provides specific methods for the intentional cultivation of both absolute and relative bodhicitta. This cultivation is considered to be a fundamental aspect of the path to Buddhahood. Practitioners of the Mahāyāna make it their primary goal to develop genuine uncontrived bodhicitta, which remains within their mindstreams continuously without having to rely on conscious effort. This is assisted by numerous methods, contemplation, rituals and meditations, such as: relying on a spiritual friend, taking refuge in the three jewels, and contemplating the defects of samsara (cyclic existence), the benefits of arousing bodhicitta (as well as the downsides of abandoning it), and developing spiritual qualities such as faith (sraddha), mindfulness and wisdom (prajña).

Numerous Mahāyāna texts outline various causes and conditions that foster the development of bodhicitta. The Bodhisattvabhūmi identifies four primary conditions (adhipatipratyaya) for generating bodhicitta:

1. Witnessing an extraordinary miracle (ṛddhi-prātihārya) performed by a buddha or bodhisattva,
2. Hearing teachings on enlightenment (bodhi) or doctrines directed at bodhisattvas (bodhisattva-piṭaka),
3. Recognizing the potential extinction of the dharma and striving to preserve the true dharma (saddharma),
4. Perceiving the suffering caused by afflictions (kleśa) in sentient beings and feeling compassion for them.

Another list is provided in Vasubandhu's Treatise on the Bodhisattva Vow (Fa putixinjing lun):

1. Contemplating the buddhas,
2. Contemplating the inherent dangers (ādīnava) of the body,
3. Cultivating compassion (karuṇā) for sentient beings,
4. Aspiring for the supreme result or fruit (phala), i.e. Buddhahood

According to Ulrich Pagel, numerous Mahāyāna sūtras, like the Bodhisattvapiṭaka, see the arising of bodhicitta (bodhicittotpāda) as an ongoing process which must be constantly refurbished (rather than as a static event which only happens once). At the outset of his Madhyamakāvatāra, Candrakīrti likens compassion (karuṇā) to a seed, water, and crops, emphasizing its significance at every stage of the bodhisattva's journey. Compassion is crucial at the beginning, as it initiates the bodhisattva's path; in the middle, as it sustains the practitioner and prevents regression into the limited nirvāṇa of an arhat; and at the end, where it manifests as the ceaseless, spontaneous actions of a fully enlightened being for the benefit of others. Karuṇā is thus regarded as the root of bodhicitta because the arising and enduring presence of bodhicitta depend on the strength of mahākaruṇā, or profound empathy for the suffering of all beings. To cultivate bodhicitta then, it is important to cultivate compassion.

A common practice in various Mahāyāna Buddhist traditions is to recite bodhisattva vows and aspiration prayers or chants which help give rise to bodhicitta. One popular chant in India and presently throughout the Mahayana world is the Bhadracaripraṇidhāna (Vows of Good Conduct) or Ārya-samantabhadra-caryā-praṇidhāna-rāja (The Royal Vow to follow the Noble Course of Conduct of Samantabhadra), a verse aspiration prayer which appears at the end of some versions of the Avatamsaka sutra. This text, originally an independent set of verses, is cited in numerous sources and was known to figures like Bhavya, Śantideva, and Kamalaśīla.

One short prayer for bodhicitta which is very popular in Tibetan Buddhism was composed by the Indian paṇḍita Dīpaṁkaraśrījñāna (Atiśa):

In Sanskrit:
buddhaṁ ca dharmaṁ ca gaṇottamaṁ ca
yāvad dhi bodhiṁ śaraṇaṁ prayāmi
dānādikr̥ tyaiś ca kr̥ tair mayaibhir
buddho bhaveyaṁ jagato hitāya

In the Buddha, the Dharma,
and the Best among Assemblies,
I go for refuge until awakening;
by the good deeds of giving, etc.,
performed by me,
may I become a Buddha

=== East Asian Buddhism ===
According to the Awakening of Faith, a key treatise in East Asian Buddhism, there are three forms of arising of bodhicitta: arising from faith, arising from understanding and practice, and arising from realization.

Jingying Huiyuan (523–592), in his Dasheng Yizhang (Compendium on the Purport of Mahāyāna), categorizes the generation of bodhicitta into three types:

1. generation of the mind based on characteristics, where the bodhisattva, seeing the nature of saṃsāra and nirvāṇa, develops aversion to saṃsāra and strives for nirvāṇa;
2. generation of the mind beyond characteristics, where the bodhisattva understands the non-duality between saṃsāra and nirvāṇa and transcends the perception of their distinct qualities;
3. generation of the mind based on truth, where the bodhisattva recognizes the original nature of awakening as identical to their own mind and returns to their original mind.

In East Asian traditions, a common method of developing bodhicitta is by reciting Sramana Zhiyi's four-fold bodhisattva vow formula, which is:

Sentient beings are numberless, I vow to save them all;
Afflictions are inexhaustible, I vow to end them all;
Dharma doors are boundless, I vow to master them all;
Buddhahood is unsurpassable, I vow to attain it.

There is also a bodhicitta mantra which is recited in some traditions of Chinese esoteric Buddhism and Shingon. The Sanskrit mantra is:

Oṃ Bodhicittam Utpādayāmi (Om I aspire to develop the Awakened mind).

=== Tibetan methods ===
Among the many methods for developing uncontrived bodhicitta given in Tibetan Mahāyāna teachings are:

- A. So as to arouse Bodhicitta, the main aspect, the Four Immeasurables (Brahmavihara) contemplation and practice:
  - Immeasurable Loving-Kindness (Maitrī),
  - Immeasurable Compassion (Karunā),
  - Immeasurable Joy in the Good Fortune of Others (Muditā),
  - Immeasurable Equanimity (Upekṣā) and
- B. So as to aspire Bodhicitta:
  - The Lojong (mind training) practices:
    - Others as equal to self: Exchanging self and others: (Tonglen) the Sending and Receiving while breathing practice,
    - Others as more important: Viewing all other sentient beings as having been our mothers in infinite past lives, and feeling gratitude for the many occasions on which they have taken care of us.
- C. So as to apply Bodhicitta and achieve enlightenment:
  - The repeated Pāramitās practice cycle: 1) Generosity, 2) Virtue, 3) Patience, 4) Effort, 5) Meditation, and 6) Insight.

Some Tibetan Buddhist lineages, particularly within the Nyingma tradition, incorporate Dream Yoga (milam) as a method for cultivating bodhicitta. This practice involves maintaining awareness during dreams to simultaneously develop compassion for dream beings and recognize the illusory nature of all phenomena, thereby training both relative and absolute bodhicitta.

In Lojong's 59 slogans, Point Two: The main practice, which is training in absolute and relative bodhicitta.

A. Absolute Bodhicitta
Slogan 2. Regard all dharmas as dreams; although experiences may seem solid, they are passing memories.
Slogan 3. Examine the nature of unborn awareness.
Slogan 4. Self-liberate even the antidote.
Slogan 5. Rest in the nature of alaya, the essence, the present moment.
Slogan 6. In post-meditation, be a child of illusion.

B.Relative Bodhicitta
Slogan 7. Sending and taking should be practiced alternately. These two should ride the breath (aka. practice Tonglen).
Slogan 8. Three objects, three poisons, three roots of virtue—the 3 objects are friends, enemies and neutrals. The 3 poisons are craving, aversion and indifference. The 3 roots of virtue are the remedies.
Slogan 9. In all activities, train with slogans.
Slogan 10. Begin the sequence of sending and taking with yourself.

When only realizing Śūnyatā, the practitioner might not benefit others, so the Mahayana path unites emptiness and compassion, this keeps from falling into the two limits and remaining on the middle way. Traditionally, Bodhisattvas practice meditative concentration at the beginning toward attaining the noble one's wisdom level, then the main practice becomes benefiting others spontaneously, unlike other paths that might discontinue benefiting others.

All the conducive causes and auspicious conditions should be complete for bodhicitta to properly arise. After continued training, these qualities can arise in the mind without contrivance.

The two main traditions in taking the Bodhicitta vows are: 1) Nagarjuna's profound view chariot and, 2) Asanga's vast conduct chariot. After which this is guarded with what to avoid, and what to adopt.

The practice can be divided into three parts: 1) mind training, 2) arousing bodhicitta, and 3) training in what to adopt and what to avoid. These can be called the 1) preliminary practice, 2) main practice, and 3) concluding practice. The preliminary practice is training in the four boundless qualities. The main practice is arousing Bodhicitta and taking vows. The concluding practice is training in what to adopt and guarding without fail against what to avoid.

The Ancient Tibetan school preliminary practice cycle in the Samantabhadra to Longchenpa to Jigme Lingpa's lineage of the Excellent Part to Omniscience: Vast Expanse Heart Essence. Invocation; Confession; Faith with Refuge: Mind Series Bodhichitta nature in the channels, inner air, and tigles; Mandala of essence, nature, and compassion; Generation: Illusory perceptions like the moon reflecting in the water. Follow like Manjushree to dedicate with the aspiration to realize the innermost meaning and realize to attain Buddhahood as a spiritual warrior.

==== Two practice lineages ====
Tibetan Buddhists maintain that there are two main ways to cultivate Bodhichitta, the "Seven Causes and Effects" that originates from Maitreya and was taught by Atisha, and "Exchanging Self and Others," taught by Shantideva and originally by Manjushri.

According to Tsongkhapa the seven causes and effects are thus:

1. recognizing all beings as your mothers;
2. recollecting their kindness;
3. the wish to repay their kindness;
4. love;
5. great compassion;
6. wholehearted resolve;
7. bodhichitta.

According to Pabongka Rinpoche the second method consists of the following meditations:

1. how self and others are equal;
2. contemplating the many faults resulting from self-cherishing;
3. contemplating the many good qualities resulting from cherishing others;
4. the actual contemplation on the interchange of self and others;
5. with these serving as the basis, the way to meditate on giving and taking (tonglen).

=== Universality ===
The practice and realization of bodhicitta are independent of sectarian considerations, since they are fundamentally a part of the human experience. Bodhisattvas are not only recognized in the Theravāda school of Buddhism, but in all other religious traditions and among those of no formal religious tradition. The present fourteenth Dalai Lama, for instance, regarded Mother Teresa as one of the greatest modern bodhisattvas.

== Source texts ==
Important later source texts on bodhicitta for Tibetan Buddhism include:

- Bodhisattvabhumi (The Bodhisattva Levels)
- Śāntideva's A Guide to the Bodhisattva's Way Of Life (c. 700 CE),
- Atisha's Bodhipathapradipa
- Thogme Zangpo's Thirty-Seven Practices of a Bodhisattva (12th century CE),
- Langri Tangpa's Eight Verses for Training the Mind (c. 1100 CE), and
- Geshe Chekhawa Training the Mind in Seven Points in the 12th century CE.

== See also ==
- Agape – Greek word for love
- Bodhisattva Precepts – Set of moral codes in Mahayana Buddhism
- Bodhisattva vow – Vow taken by Mahayana Buddhists to liberate all sentient beings
- Vijñāna – Indic term for ideas related to discernment, mind/consciousness, life force, etc
