= Tonglen =

Meditation practice of Tibetan Buddhism

Tonglen is a Buddhist practice that involves breathing in the suffering of others and breathing out peace and healing. Its purpose is to cultivate compassion.

Tong means "giving or sending", and len means "receiving or taking". Tonglen is also known as "exchanging self with other."

== Practice ==
In the practice, one exchanges the self with other, sending and taking should be practiced alternately. These two should ride the breath. As such it is a training in altruism.

The function of the practice is to:

- reduce selfish attachment
- increase a sense of renunciation
- purify karma by giving and helping
- develop and expand loving-kindness and bodhicitta

The practice of Tonglen involves all of the Six Perfections; giving, ethics, patience, joyous effort, concentration and wisdom. These are the practices of a Bodhisattva.

== Practical aspects ==
Patrul Rinpoche (1808–1887), a prominent teacher and author from the Nyingma school of Tibetan Buddhism, gives the practice as starting on breathing out, with imagining giving (sending) happiness and the best. Then, as breathing in, imagine taking (receiving) in the sufferings.

Pema Chödrön, an American Tibetan Buddhist nun in the Shambhala Buddhism tradition (2000), says Tonglen can start on the inhale and gives the instruction as follows:

"On the in-breath, you breathe in whatever particular area, group of people, country, or even one particular person... maybe it's not this more global situation, maybe it's breathing in the physical discomfort and mental anguish of chemotherapy; of all the people who are undergoing chemotherapy. And if you've undergone chemotherapy and come out the other side, it's very real to you. Or maybe it's the pain of those who have lost loved ones; suddenly, or recently, unexpectedly or over a long period of time, some dying. But the in-breath is... you find some place on the planet in your personal life or something you know about, and you breathe in with the wish that those human beings or those mistreated animals or whoever it is, that they could be free of that suffering, and you breathe in with the longing to remove their suffering.

And then you send out – just relax out... send enough space so that peoples' hearts and minds feel big enough to live with their discomfort, their fear, their anger or their despair, or their physical or mental anguish. But you can also breathe out for those who have no food and drink, you can breathe out food and drink. For those who are homeless, you can breathe out/send them shelter. For those who are suffering in any way, you can send out safety, comfort.

So in the in-breath you breathe in with the wish to take away the suffering, and breathe out with the wish to send comfort and happiness to the same people, animals, nations, or whatever it is you decide.

Do this for an individual, or do this for large areas, and if you do this with more than one subject in mind, that's fine… breathing in as fully as you can, radiating out as widely as you can."

The intention of this practice is to work with habitual patterns of mind and "develop the psychological attitude of exchanging oneself for others," as Chogyam Trungpa Rinpoche writes in Training the Mind and Cultivating Kindness.

Taking onto oneself the suffering of others and giving happiness and success to all sentient beings seems a heavy task, especially for a beginner in the practice. It might be appropriate to start out with smaller issues, like working with oneself to increase one's own well-being, increasing harmony in the family, open one's own mind to communicate better with other people or just finding more peace in doing the necessary daily chores. This is an area where it might be easier to experience some success in order to be able to go on with taking on the unhappiness or conflicts among other people, even though the principal aim is to develop one's own selfless and empathic qualities more than or at least as much as creating a real difference for others. The principle of taking in the suffering or disharmony on the in-breath and spreading an antidote of joy, harmony or peace of mind (or whatever might be needed in the specific case) on the out-breath is the same as described above. It is also a good option to use a small pause after the in-breath to convert the suffering or disharmony to the positive antidote which is to be breathed out.

Taking on suffering does not really mean to burden oneself with the misery of the world, but rather to acknowledge its existence and accept it. This makes it possible to increase one's own peace of mind at the same time as taking suffering or disharmony in, so there is less contradiction than there might seem to be.

Tonglen is also part of the contemplative practice of Lojong, in the Tibetan Buddhist tradition.

== History ==
This practice is summarized in seven points, which are attributed to the great Indian Buddhist teacher Atisha Dipankara Shrijnana, born in 982 CE. They were first written down by Kadampa master Langri Tangpa (1054–1123). The practice became more widely known when Geshe Chekawa Yeshe Dorje (1101–1175) summarized the points in his Seven Points of Training the Mind. This list of mind training (lojong) aphorisms or 'slogans' compiled by Chekawa is often referred to as the Atisha Slogans.

== See also ==
- Lojong
- Mettā - an associated practice
- Buddhist meditation

== Audio ==
- Chödrön, Pema. Good Medicine: How to Turn Pain into Compassion With Tonglen Meditation. Sounds True, Inc, 2001. ISBN 1-56455-846-0.
