= Shantideva =

8th-century Indian Buddhist monk and scholar

Śāntideva
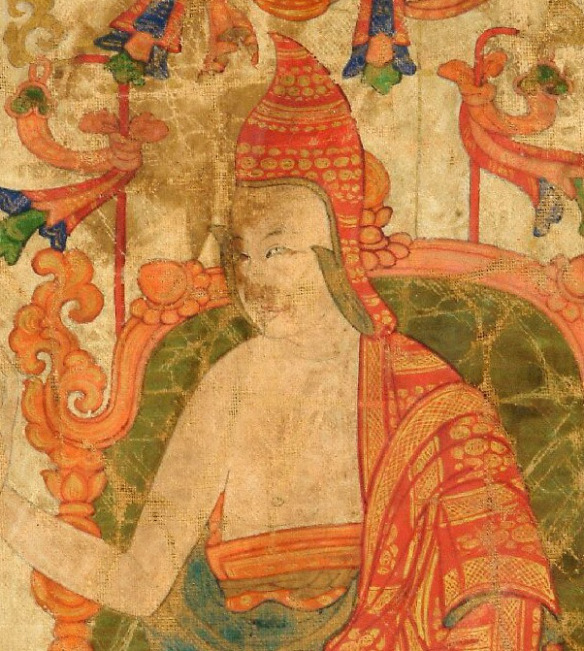
- Tibetan depiction of Shantideva

Personal life
- Born: c. 685 CE
- Died: c. 763 CE
- Education: Nalanda

Religious life
- Religion: Buddhism
- School: Mahāyāna Buddhism; Madhyamaka

Shantideva (Sanskrit: Śāntideva; Chinese: 寂天; Tibetan: ཞི་བ་ལྷ།, THL: Zhiwa Lha; Mongolian: Шантидэва гэгээн; Vietnamese: Tịch Thiên) was an 8th-century CE Indian philosopher, Buddhist monk, poet, and scholar at the mahavihara of Nalanda. He was an adherent of the Mādhyamaka philosophy of Nāgārjuna. Abhayadatta Sri also lists Shantideva as one of the eighty-four mahasiddhas and is known as Bhusuku Pa (布苏固巴).

Two works of Shantideva are extant, the Bodhisattvacaryāvatāra and the Śikṣāsamuccaya, both of which were written with the intention of being training manuals for one who intends to follow the path of the bodhisattva. The Bodhisattvacaryāvatāra, in particular, was the subject of both Indian and Tibetan commentaries during the period it was written and has also received large amounts of attention from both academics and lay practitioners in recent years as well including a commentary written by the 14th Dalai Lama.

== Biography ==
There are two sources of Shantideva's life composed by the Tibetan historians; Buton Rinchen Drub and Taranatha. Recent scholarship has also brought to light a short Sanskrit language biography of Shantideva in a 14th-century Nepalese manuscript.

According to one source, Shantideva was born in the Saurastra region (in modern-day Gujarat), son of a King Kalyanavarman, and went by the name Śantivarman. But Vibhūticandra's Bodhicaryāvatāratātparyapañjikā Viśeṣadyotanī, the earliest extant biography of Shantideva, details that he was born in Southern India, in the city of Sringara, and his father was a King Mañjuśrīvarman. As per Vibhūticandra, Shantideva ran away from home on the advice of his mother and travelled to Bengal and then Magadha. He served in the court of a Magadhan king and after leaving, arrived in Nalanda. During his stay in Nalanda, he was given the nickname, Bhūsuku due to his practice of Samadhi.

According to Pema Chödrön, "Shantideva was not well-liked at Nalanda" due to his idleness.

Apparently he was one of those people who didn't show up for anything, never studying or coming to practice sessions. His fellow monks said that his three "realizations" were eating, sleeping, and shitting.

According to legend, Shantideva was goaded by his fellow monks into giving a talk to the entire university body while sitting on a large lion throne with the hope that on being exposed as unable to recite any scriptures, he would leave the monastery on his own accord. Shantideva easily climbed the throne and recited stanza 9.35 of The Way of the Bodhisattva. The legend continues that at this point, the bodhisattva Manjushri appeared and then suddenly disappeared together with Shantideva. Following this event, when the monks investigated his cells, they discovered his three works, the Sūtrasamuccaya, the Śikṣāsamuccaya, and the completed Bodhicaryāvatāra.

=== Conversionary activities in Magadha ===
Bu Ston details several tales from Shantideva's life which detail how he converted 500 Magadhans to Buddhism. It is said that Shantideva lived alongside the non-Buddhists while they were experiencing a natural disaster which led to them suffering from starvation. As he was appointed the head of these people, Shantideva demonstrated his supernatural abilities as he managed to make a single bowl of rice suffice for all of the 500. Similar stories are found in other sources detailing how Santideva would feed hundreds of beggars.

== Works ==
=== Śikṣāsamuccaya ===
The Śikṣāsamuccaya ("Training Anthology") is a prowith work in 19 chapters. It is organized as a commentary on 27 short mnemonic verses known as the Śikṣāsamuccaya Kārikā. It consists primarily of quotations (of varying length) from sūtras, authoritative texts considered to be the word of the Buddha—generally those sūtras associated with Mahāyāna tradition, including the Samadhiraja Sutra.

=== Bodhicaryavatara ===
Shantideva is particularly renowned as the author of the Bodhisattvacaryāvatāra. A variety of English translations exist, sometimes glossed as "A Guide to the Bodhisattva's Way of Life" or "Entering the Path of Enlightenment." It is a long poem describing the process of enlightenment from the first thought to full buddhahood and is still studied by Mahayana and Vajrayana Buddhists today.

An introduction to and commentary on the Bodhisattvacaryāvatāra by the 14th Dalai Lama called A Flash of Lightning in the Dark of Night was printed in 1994. A commentary on the Patience chapter was provided by the Dalai Lama in Healing Anger (1997), and his commentaries on the Wisdom chapter are in Practicing Wisdom (2004). Kunzang Palden has written a commentary based on that given by Patrul Rinpoche, translated by the Padmakara Translation Group. Patrul was a wandering monk of great scholarship who dedicated his life to propagating the Bodhisattvacaryāvatāra.

== Philosophical views ==
=== Personal identity and free will ===
Following the Buddha, Śāntideva believed that our innate investment in an inherent, personal, self or essence is not only groundless but toxic. Goodman suggests that Śāntideva also touches on the problem of free will in the Bodhicaryāvatāra, writing that "whatever transgressions (aparādha) and vile actions (pāpa) there are, all arise through the power of conditioning factors, while there is nothing that arises independently."

=== Ethical views ===
In line with his views on personal identity and the nature of the self, Śāntideva wrote that one ought to "stop all the present and future pain and suffering of all sentient beings, and to bring about all present and future pleasure and happiness", in what may have been "the very earliest clearly articulated statement of that view, preceding Jeremy Bentham by approximately a thousand years".

His basis for preferring altruism over egoism is that "the continuum of consciousness, like a queue, and the combination of constituents, like an army, are not real. The person who experiences suffering does not exist." Similarly, he asks, "when happiness is dear to me and others equally, what is so special about me that I strive after happiness only for myself?"

=== Bodhicitta ===
The Bodhisattva is the central focus for both of the texts attributed to Shantideva. Bodhicitta is the mind that is focused on attaining the status of bodhisattva. The early chapters of the Bodhisattvacaryāvatāra are focused on praising the virtuous qualities of bodhicitta and also on how to strengthen and maintain it.

Shantideva states:

Those who long to overcome the abundant miseries of mundane existence, those who wish to dispel the adversities of sentient beings, and those who yearn to experience a myriad of joys should never forsake bodhicitta.

Shantideva also argued that the development of Bodhicitta was beneficial not just to those who are following the path of the Bodhisattva but also to those who are pursuing their well-being and happiness. His view is that the mind of one who has developed Bodhicitta is the solution to countering mental afflictions (klesas) such as cravings (Taṇhā) and anger (krodha).

=== Generosity ===
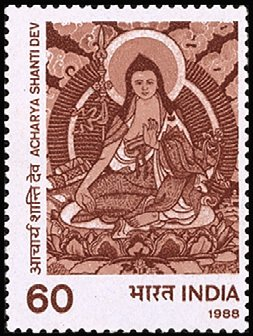
Stamp of India 1988 of Shantideva

References to generosity (known as Dāna in the Indian tradition), can be found throughout both of Shantideva's extant works. Shantideva mainly views generosity as a specific mental state where an individual has renounced all of their possessions. It does not necessarily refer to the distribution of one's own possessions. The bodhisattva achieves the mental state of "generosity" by renouncing three things; the body, the possessions, and karmic merit. This is viewed by Shantideva as an important requirement for one who is on the path of the Bodhisattva. Shantideva also states in the Bodhicaryāvatāra that he believes generosity to be beneficial by comparing it with nirvana:

Abandoning everything is nirvana, and my mind seeks nirvana. If I must abandon it, it is better that I give it to sentient beings.

Hence from this passage, Shantideva believes the perfection of generosity to be liberation. This conception of generosity is therefore twofold with generosity benefiting oneself and benefiting others at the same time.
