= Lojong =

Contemplative Tibetan Buddhist practice

Lojong (Tibetan: བློ་སྦྱོང་, Wylie: blo sbyong, 'mind training') is a contemplative practice in the Tibetan Buddhist tradition which makes use of various lists of aphorisms or slogans which are used for contemplative practice. The practice involves refining and purifying one's motivations and attitudes. There are various sets of lojong aphorisms; the most widespread text in the Sarma traditions is that of Chekawa Yeshe Dorje (12th century). There is also another set of eight lojong slogans by Langri Tangpa. In the Nyingma tradition, there is a list of seven lojong slogans which are part of the Dzogchen Nyingthig lineage.

Lojong slogans are designed as a set of antidotes to undesired mental habits that cause suffering. They contain both methods to expand one's viewpoint towards absolute or ultimate bodhicitta, such as "Find the consciousness you had before you were born" and "Treat everything you perceive as a dream", and methods for relating to the world in a more constructive way with relative bodhicitta, such as "Be grateful to everyone", and "When everything goes wrong, treat disaster as a way to wake up".

Prominent teachers who have popularized this practice in the West include Pema Chödrön, Ken McLeod, B. Alan Wallace, Chögyam Trungpa, Sogyal Rinpoche, Kelsang Gyatso, Norman Fischer and the 14th Dalai Lama.

== History of the practice ==
Lojong mind training practice was developed over a 300-year period between 900 and 1200 CE, as part of the Mahāyāna school of Buddhism. Atiśa (982–1054 CE), a Bengali meditation master, is generally regarded as the originator of the practice. It is not described in his Lamp on the Path to Enlightenment (Bodhipathapradīpaṃ) but rather is based on oral teachings. The practice is based upon his studies with the Sumatran teacher, Dharmakīrtiśrī (Tib. Serlingpa, Wylie: gser gling pa), and the Indian teacher Dharmarakṣita, a prominent teacher at Odantapuri and author of a text called the Wheel of Sharp Weapons. Both these texts are well known in Tibetan translation. Atiśa's third major teacher of lojong is said to have been the junior Kusalī, known also as Maitrīyogi.

Atiśa journeyed to Sumatra and studied with Dharmakīrtiśrī for twelve years. He then returned to teach in India, but at an advanced age accepted an invitation to teach in Tibet, where he stayed for the rest of his life.

A story is told that Atiśa heard that the inhabitants of Tibet were very pleasant and easy to get along with. Instead of being delighted, he was concerned that he would not have enough negative emotion to work with in his mind training practice. So he brought along his ill-tempered Bengali servant-boy, who would criticize him incessantly and was challenging to spend time with. Tibetan teachers then like to joke that when Atiśan arrived in Tibet, he realized there was no need after all.

The aphorisms on mind training in their present form were composed by Chekawa Yeshe Dorje (1101–1175 CE). According to one account, Chekhawa saw a text on his cell-mate's bed, open to the phrase: "Gain and victory to others, loss and defeat to oneself". The phrase struck him and he sought out the author Langri Tangpa (1054–1123). Finding that Langri Tangpa had died, he studied instead with one of Langri Tangpa's students, Sharawa Yönten Drak, for twelve years.

Chekhawa is claimed to have cured leprosy with mind training. In one account, he went to live with a colony of lepers and did the practice with them. Over time many of them were healed, more lepers came, and eventually people without leprosy also took an interest in the practice. Another popular story about Chekhawa and mind training concerns his brother and how it transformed him into a much kinder person.

== Chekawa Yeshe Dorje's root text ==
Chekawa Yeshe Dorje's lojong consists of 59 slogans, or aphorisms. These slogans are further organized into seven groupings, called the "7 Points of Lojong". The categorized slogans are listed below, translated by the Nalanda Translation Committee under the direction of Chögyam Trungpa. The following is translated from ancient Sanskrit and Tibetan texts and may vary slightly from other translations. Many contemporary gurus and experts have written extensive commentaries elucidating the Lojong text and slogans. (See the section "Commentaries", below, for examples).

Point One: The preliminaries, which are the basis for dharma practice

Slogan 1. First, train in the preliminaries; The four reminders. or alternatively called the Four Thoughts

1. Maintain an awareness of the preciousness of human life.
2. Be aware of the reality that life ends; death comes for everyone; Impermanence.
3. Recall that whatever you do, whether virtuous or not, has a result; Karma.
4. Contemplate that as long as you are too focused on self-importance and too caught up in thinking about how you are good or bad, you will experience suffering. Obsessing about getting what you want and avoiding what you don't want does not result in happiness; Ego.

Point Two: The main practice, which is training in bodhicitta.

Absolute Bodhicitta
Slogan 2. Regard all dharmas as dreams; although experiences may seem solid, they are passing memories.
Slogan 3. Examine the nature of unborn awareness.
Slogan 4. Self-liberate even the antidote.
Slogan 5. Rest in the nature of alaya, the essence, the present moment.
Slogan 6. In postmeditation, be a child of illusion.

Relative Bodhicitta
Slogan 7. Sending and taking should be practiced alternately. These two should ride the breath (i.e., practice Tonglen).
Slogan 8. Three objects, three poisons, three roots of virtue

The 3 objects are friends, enemies and neutrals.
The 3 poisons are craving, aversion and indifference.
The 3 roots of virtue are the remedies.

Slogan 9. In all activities, train with slogans.
Slogan 10. Begin the sequence of sending and taking with yourself.

Point Three: Transformation of Bad Circumstances into the Way of Enlightenment

Slogan 11. When the world is filled with evil, transform all mishaps into the path of bodhi.
Slogan 12. Drive all blames into one.
Slogan 13. Be grateful to everyone.
Slogan 14. Seeing confusion as the four kayas is unsurpassable Śūnyatā protection.

The kayas are Dharmakaya, sambhogakaya, nirmanakaya, svabhavikakaya. Thoughts have no birthplace, thoughts are unceasing, thoughts are not solid, and these three characteristics are interconnected. Śūnyatā can be described as "complete openness."

Slogan 15. Four practices are the best of methods.

The four practices are: accumulating merit, laying down evil deeds, offering to the dons, and offering to the dharmapalas.

Slogan 16. Whatever you meet unexpectedly, join with meditation.

Point Four: Showing the Utilization of Practice in One's Whole Life

Slogan 17. Practice the five strengths, the condensed heart instructions.

The 5 strengths are: strong determination, familiarization, the positive seed, reproach, and aspiration.

Slogan 18. The Mahāyāna instruction for ejection of consciousness at death is the five strengths: how you conduct yourself is important.

When you are dying practice the 5 strengths.

Point Five: Evaluation of Mind Training

Slogan 19. All dharma agrees at one point—All Buddhist teachings are about lessening the ego, lessening one's self-absorption.
Slogan 20. Of the two witnesses, hold the principal one—You know yourself better than anyone else knows you
Slogan 21. Always maintain only a joyful mind.
Slogan 22. If you can practice even when distracted, you are well trained.

Point Six: Disciplines of Mind Training

Slogan 23. Always abide by the three basic principles—Dedication to your practice, refraining from outrageous conduct, developing patience.
Slogan 24. Change your attitude, but remain natural—Reduce ego clinging, but be yourself.
Slogan 25. Don't talk about injured limbs—Don't take pleasure contemplating others' defects.
Slogan 26. Don't ponder others—Don't take pleasure contemplating others' weaknesses.
Slogan 27. Work with the greatest defilements first—Work with your greatest obstacles first.
Slogan 28. Abandon any hope of fruition—Don't get caught up in how you will be in the future, stay in the present moment.
Slogan 29. Abandon poisonous food.
Slogan 30. Don't be so predictable—Don't hold grudges.
Slogan 31. Don't malign others.
Slogan 32. Don't wait in ambush—Don't wait for others' weaknesses to show to attack them.
Slogan 33. Don't bring things to a painful point—Don't humiliate others.
Slogan 34. Don't transfer the ox's load to the cow—Take responsibility for yourself.
Slogan 35. Don't try to be the fastest—Don't compete with others.
Slogan 36. Don't act with a twist—Do good deeds without scheming about benefiting yourself.
Slogan 37. Don't turn gods into demons—Don't use these slogans or your spirituality to increase your self-absorption
Slogan 38. Don't seek others' pain as the limbs of your own happiness.

Point Seven: Guidelines of Mind Training

Slogan 39. All activities should be done with one intention.
Slogan 40. Correct all wrongs with one intention.
Slogan 41. Two activities: one at the beginning, one at the end.
Slogan 42. Whichever of the two occurs, be patient.
Slogan 43. Observe these two, even at the risk of your life.
Slogan 44. Train in the three difficulties.
Slogan 45. Take on the three principal causes: the teacher, the dharma, the sangha.
Slogan 46. Pay heed that the three never wane: gratitude towards one's teacher, appreciation of the dharma (teachings) and correct conduct.
Slogan 47. Keep the three inseparable: body, speech, and mind.
Slogan 48. Train without bias in all areas. It is crucial always to do this pervasively and wholeheartedly.
Slogan 49. Always meditate on whatever provokes resentment.
Slogan 50. Don't be swayed by external circumstances.
Slogan 51. This time, practice the main points: others before self, dharma, and awakening compassion.
Slogan 52. Don't misinterpret.

The six things that may be misinterpreted are patience, yearning, excitement, compassion, priorities and joy. You're patient when you're getting your way, but not when its difficult. You yearn for worldly things, instead of an open heart and mind. You get excited about wealth and entertainment, instead of your potential for enlightenment. You have compassion for those you like, but none for those you don't. Worldly gain is your priority rather than cultivating loving-kindness and compassion. You feel joy when your enemies suffer, and do not rejoice in others' good fortune.

Slogan 53. Don't vacillate (in your practice of Lojong).
Slogan 54. Train wholeheartedly.
Slogan 55. Liberate yourself by examining and analyzing: Know your own mind with honesty and fearlessness.
Slogan 56. Don't wallow in self-pity.
Slogan 57. Don't be jealous.
Slogan 58. Don't be frivolous.
Slogan 59. Don't expect applause.

=== Commentaries ===
One seminal commentary on the mind training practice was written by Jamgon Kongtrul (one of the main founders of the non-sectarian Rime movement of Tibetan Buddhism) in the 19th century. This commentary was translated by Ken McLeod, initially as A Direct Path to Enlightenment. This translation served as the root text for Osho's Book of Wisdom. Later, after some consultation with Chögyam Trungpa, Ken McLeod retranslated the work as The Great Path of Awakening.

Two commentaries to the root texts of mind training have been written by Kelsang Gyatso (founder of the New Kadampa Tradition) and form the basis of study programs at NKT Buddhist Centers throughout the world. The first, Universal Compassion is a commentary to the root text Training the Mind in Seven Points by Chekawa Yeshe Dorje. The second, Eight Steps to Happiness is a commentary to the root text, Eight Verses of Training the Mind by Langri Tangpa.

In 1994, Shambhala Publications first published Start Where you Are, A Guide to Compassionate Living by Pema Chödrön, which is mostly commentary on the lojong slogans. This work has been republished many times.

In 2006, Wisdom Publications published the work Mind Training: The Great Collection (Theg-pa chen-po blo-sbyong rgya-rtsa), translated by Thupten Jinpa. This is a translation of a traditional Tibetan compilation, dating from the fifteenth century, which contains altogether forty-three texts related to the practice of mind training. Among these texts are several different versions of the root verses, along with important early commentaries by Se Chilbu, Sangye Gompa, Konchok Gyaltsen, Dalaielan Roebuck and others.

In 2012, Shambhala Publications published Training in Compassion: Zen teachings on the Practice of Lojong by Zoketsu Norman Fischer which teaches ways to incorporate Lojong practices into Zen. Fischer felt that "the plain-speaking tradition of Zen might lend something to the power of the text" and that "although Zen is a Mahayana school (and therefore based on compassion teachings), it is nevertheless deficient in explicit teachings on compassion".

In 2016, Shambhala Publications published The Intelligent Heart: A Guide to the Compassionate Life by Dzigar Kongtrul Rinpoche, with foreword by Pema Chödrön.

In 2017, Shambhala Publications published The Compassion Book, Teachings to Awaken the Heart with the slogans translated by the Nalanda Translation Committee, and short commentaries by Pema Chödrön. This provides a very short summary of the slogans.

== The seven lojongs in Nyingma ==
The Nyingma school of Tibetan Buddhism has its own unique lojong tradition and root texts which is based on a set of seven lojongs. The first six aphorisms are mainly about common Buddhist Mahayana topics which can be found in the Sarma schools lojong texts, but the seventh lojong methods are unique to the Dzogchen tradition's lojong texts. The seventh lojong include methods which work with the energies and channels of the subtle body.

The seven lojong are found in the works of Longchenpa, who wrote a commentary on a text of Garab Dorje which is in turn a commentary to the root text of these lojongs, the Dzogchen Tantra of the Sole Offspring. Jigme Lingpa wrote a commentary on these seven points of mind training, which is called The Steps to Liberation. Later masters like Jamgyang Khyentse Wangpo and Jamgon Kontrul also wrote commentaries on these lojongs.

The seven lojongs are as follows:

1. Impermanence
2. Suffering, the fleeting nature of happiness
3. The causes of death
4. The meaninglessness of all mundane actions
5. The virtues of the Buddha / Liberation
6. The value of the guru's teachings
7. Training the mind in the state of non-conceptuality / the state beyond thought
