= Bodhisattvacaryāvatāra =

Mahāyāna Buddhist text by Shantideva (c. 700 CE)

The Bodhisattvacaryāvatāra (Entering the Bodhisattva Conduct) or Bodhicaryāvatāra (Entering the Bodhi Way; Tibetan: བྱང་ཆུབ་སེམས་དཔའི་སྤྱོད་པ་ལ་འཇུག་པ་ byang chub sems dpa'i spyod pa la 'jug pa; Chinese: 入菩薩行論), is a Mahāyāna Buddhist text written c. 700 CE in Sanskrit verse by Shantideva (Śāntideva), a Buddhist monk at Nālandā University in India which is also where it was composed.

== Structure ==
Bodhisattvacaryāvatāra has ten chapters dedicated to the development of bodhicitta (the mind of enlightenment) through the practice of the six perfections (Skt. Pāramitās). The text begins with a chapter describing the benefits of the wish to reach enlightenment. The sixth chapter, on the perfection of patient endurance (Skt. kṣānti), strongly criticizes anger and has been the subject of recent commentaries by Robert Thurman and the fourteenth Dalai Lama. Tibetan scholars consider the ninth chapter, "Wisdom", to be one of the most succinct expositions of the Madhyamaka view. The tenth chapter is used as one of the most popular Mahāyāna prayers.

== Chapter summary ==
1. The benefits of bodhicitta (the wish to reach full enlightenment for others)
2. Purifying bad deeds
3. Adopting the spirit of enlightenment
4. Using conscientiousness
5. Guarding awareness
6. The practice of patience
7. The practice of joyous effort
8. The practice of meditative concentration
9. The perfection of wisdom
10. Dedication

== Exegetical discourse and commentary ==
Many Tibetan scholars, such as Jamgön Ju Mipham Gyatso, have written commentaries on this text.

== Commentaries and studies in English ==
- Brassard, Francis (2000), The Concept of Bodhicitta in Santideva's Bodhicaryavatara, History of religions, State University of New York (SUNY) Press, ISBN 0-7914-4575-5
- Dalai Lama, XIV; Padmakara Translation Group (1994), A Flash of Lightning in the Dark of Night: Guide to the Bodhisattva's Way of Life (1st ed.), Shambhala, ISBN 0-87773-971-4
- Dalai Lama, XIV; Geshe Thupten Jinpa (trans & ed) (2004), Practicing Wisdom: The Perfection of Shantideva's Bodhisattva Way, Wisdom Publications, U.S., ISBN 0-86171-182-3
- Pema Chödrön (2005), No Time to Lose: A Timely Guide to the Way of the Bodhisattva, commentary on Shantideva's Guide to the Bodhisattva's Way of Life, Boston: Shambhala, ISBN 1-59030-135-8
- Geshe Yeshe Topden (2005), The Way of Awakening: A Commentary on Shantideva's Bodhicharyavatara, Wisdom Publications, U.S., ISBN 0-86171-494-6
- Gyatso, Kelsang (1980), Meaningful to Behold: View, meditation and action in Mahayana Buddhism : an oral commentary to Shantideva's A guide to the Bodhisattva's way of life, Wisdom Publications, ISBN 0-86171-003-7
- Khenchen Kunzang Pelden; Padmakara Translation Group (2008), The Nectar of Manjushri's Speech: A Detailed Commentary on Shantideva's Way of the Bodhisattva, Shambhala, ISBN 978-1-59030-439-6
- Khenchen Kunzang Pelden; Minyak Kunzang Sonam; Padmakara Translation Group, Wisdom: Two Buddhist Commentaries on the Ninth Chapter of Shantideva's Bodhicharyravatara
- Khenchen Thrangu Rinpoche; Holmes, Ken (transl.); Doctor, Thomas (transl.) (2001), A Guide to the Bodhisattva's Way of Life of Shantideva, Kathmandu: Namo Buddha Seminar, ASIN: B000UO76C6
- Schmidt-Leukel, Perry (2019), Buddha Mind - Christ Mind. A Christian Commentary on the Bodhicaryāvatāra. With a new translation by Ernst Steinkellner and Cynthia Peck-Kubaczek, Christian Commentaries on Non-Christian Sacred Texts, Peeters, ISBN 978-90-429-3848-9
- Shantideva; Khenpo David Karma Choephel (trans) (2021), Entering the Way of the Bodhisattva: A New Translation and Contemporary Guide, Shambhala, ISBN 978-1611808629
- Williams, Paul (1997), Altruism and Reality: Studies in the Philosophy of the Bodhicaryavatara, Routledge Curzon Critical Studies in Buddhism, Routledge Curzon, ISBN 0-7007-1031-0
- Williams, Paul (1997), The Reflexive Nature of Awareness (Rang Rig): Tibetan Madhyamaka Defence, Routledge Curzon Critical Studies in Buddhism (1st ed.), Routledge Curzon, ISBN 0-7007-1030-2
