= Bodhipathapradīpa =

11th-century Buddhist text

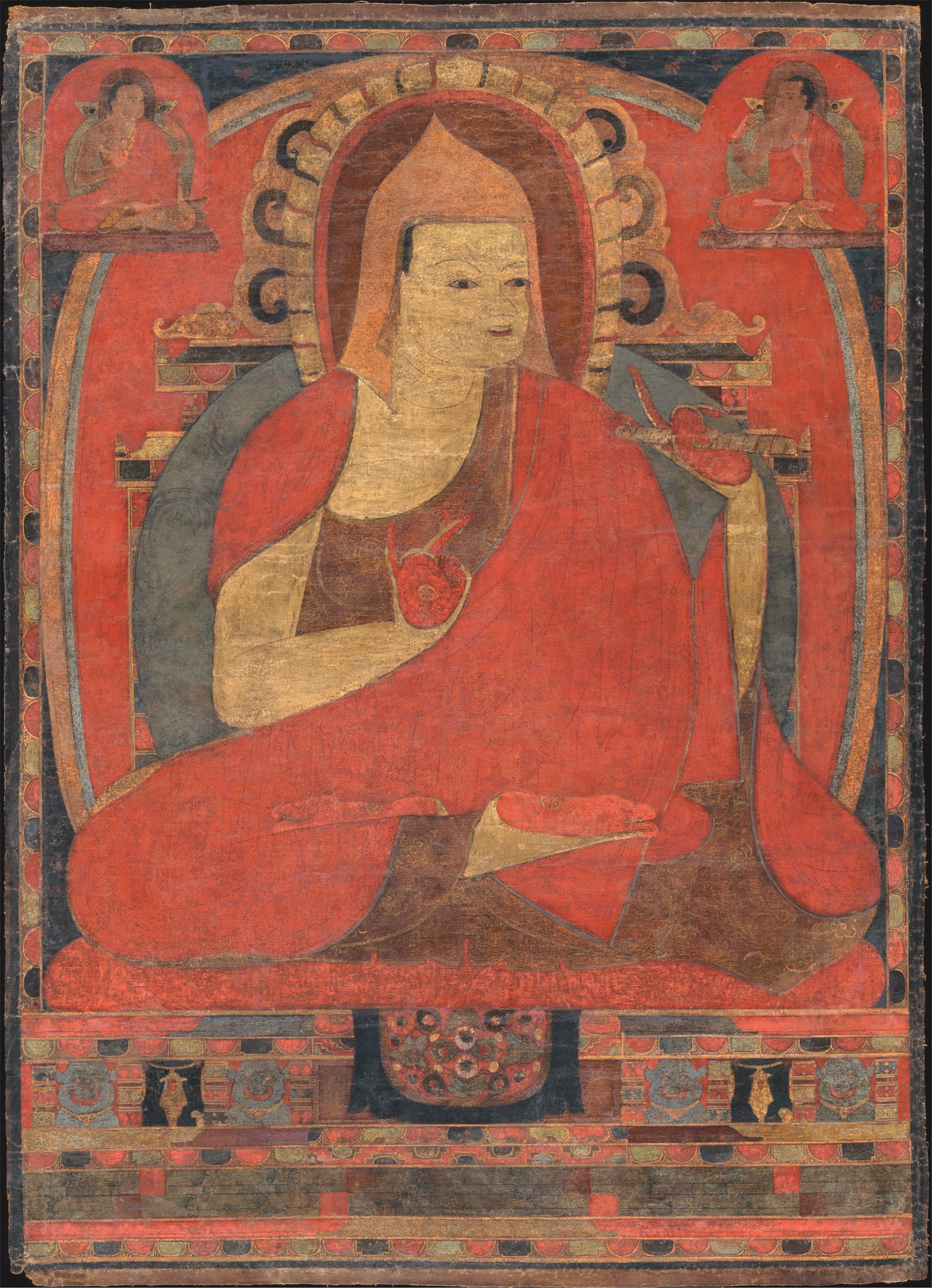

Bodhipathapradīpa (A Lamp for the Path to Enlightenment) is a Buddhist text composed in Sanskrit by the 11th-century teacher Atiśa and widely considered his magnum opus. The text reconciles the doctrines of many various Buddhist schools and philosophies, and is notable for the introduction of the three levels of spiritual aspiration: lesser, middling and superior, which in turn became the foundation for the Lamrim tradition. This text was translated into Tibetan as Byang chub lam gyi sgron ma.

In the text, Atiśa classifies individuals into three different capacities, and writes for those of the final capacity, which he calls "Supreme".

- "Inferior individuals": those who are still attached to samsaric existence.
- "Middling individuals": those who have renounced samsara and seek liberation, but only for themselves.
- "Superior individuals": those who have personally renounced samsara, but are committed to bringing everyone else to enlightenment.

== The Importance of Bodhicitta ==
After taking refuge in the Three Jewels, a feature of all Buddhist traditions, Atiśa provides specific instructions:

Then, beginning with a mind of love

for all sentient beings,

consider all those, without exception,

who suffer in the three lower realms

from birth, death, and so forth.

With the wish to liberate all beings

from the suffering of suffering,

from suffering and its causes,

generate bodhicitta with irreversible resolve.

== The Generation of Bodhicitta ==
Once Atiśa has described the importance of generating bodhicitta, he provides a prayer used by another Buddhist master to accomplish this:

“In the presence of the Protectors,

I generate the mind of perfect enlightenment,

and I invite all beings as my guests—

These I shall liberate from saṃsāra.

“From this moment until

I achieve supreme enlightenment,

I shall have no thoughts of harm,

no anger, avarice, or jealousy.

“I shall cultivate pure conduct,

and abandon sin and craving.

With joy for the vows of discipline,

I shall train to emulate the Buddhas.

“Taking no joy in swiftly

attaining enlightenment for myself,

I will remain until the very end

for the sake of even a single being.

“I shall prepare immeasurable,

inconceivable realms

and will remain in the ten directions

for any who call out my name.

“Having purified all

physical and verbal actions,

I shall also purify my mental activities,

and will avoid all that is non-virtuous.”
