= Langri Tangpa =

Geshe Langri Thangpa (གླང་རི་ཐང་པ།; wylie: glang ri thang pa) (1054–1123) is an important figure in the lineage of the Kadampa and Gelug schools of Tibetan Buddhism. He was born in Phenpo, as Dorje Senge (རྡོ་རྗེ་ སེང་གེ; wylie: rdo rje seng ge). His name derives from Langtang, the area in which he is said to have lived. He was a Kadampa master, and disciple of Potowa Rinchen Sel.

In the 2nd water bird year he founded Langtang Monastery (གླང་ཐང་ ; wylie: glang thang), as a Kadampa monastery. It later became a Sakya monastery.

He was the author of Eight Verses of Training the Mind (བློ་སྦྱོང་ཚིགས་བརྒྱད་མ།; wylie: blo sbyong tshigs brgyad ma), considered a succinct summary of the Lojong (བློ་སྦྱོང་; wylie: blo sbyong) teachings of Mahayana Buddhism. He is said to be an emanation of Buddha Amitābha.

== See also ==
- Geshe Chekhawa, author of Training the Mind in Seven Points, an explanation of Lojong
- His Holiness the Dalai Lama, Transforming the Mind: Eight Verses on Generating Compassion and Transforming your Life, Thorsons (2000) ISBN 0-7225-3865-0
- Lojong (Mind training)

== Sources ==
- Langri Tangpa's Eight Verses for Training the Mind
- Tibetan Himalayan Digital Library Online Dictionary
