= Chekawa Yeshe Dorje =

Kadampa Buddhist meditation master

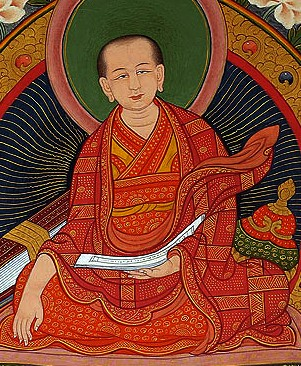
Chekawa Yeshe Dorje

Geshe Chekhawa (or Chekawa Yeshe Dorje) (1102–1176) was a prolific Kadampa Buddhist meditation master who was the author of the celebrated root text Training the Mind in Seven Points, which is an explanation of Buddha's instructions on training the mind or Lojong in Tibetan. These teachings reveal how sincere Buddhist practitioners can transform adverse conditions into the path to enlightenment, principally, by developing their own compassion. Before Chekhawa Yeshe Dorje's root text this special set of teachings given by Buddha were secret teachings only given to faithful disciples.

Chekhawa Yeshe Dorje was born into a family that practiced the Nyingma tradition of Tibetan Buddhism. However, as is common in all the traditions of Tibetan Buddhism, he also sought teachings from other traditions. He received teachings from Rechungpa (one of Milarepa's main disciples) and later from Kadampa Geshes. After reading the text Eight Verses of Training the Mind by Geshe Langri Tangpa he immediately set out to Lhasa in search of Langri Tangpa. When he arrived in Lhasa, he discovered that Geshe Langri Tangpa had died. So he searched for his disciples and found Geshe Sharawa who was one of his main disciples.

When Chekawa Yeshe Dorje met Sharawa, he asked him "How important is the practice of accepting defeat and offering the victory to others?" Sharawa replied, "If you want to attain enlightenment, this practice is essential." Chekhawa Yeshe Dorje then requested full instructions on this practice and Sharawa said "If you stay with me for several years I will teach you." Chekhawa Yeshe Dorje stayed with Sharawa for 12 years until he mastered the practice of training the mind. He had to face many different kinds of ordeals: all sorts of difficulties, criticism, hardships, and abuse. And the teaching was so effective, and his perseverance in its practice so intense, that he completely eradicated any self-grasping and self-cherishing.

At this time in Tibet, leprosy was very common in Tibet, because doctors were unable to cure it. When Chekhawa Yeshe Dorje encountered lepers, he developed heartfelt compassion for them and wished to help them. He gave them teachings on training the mind, especially the teachings on Tonglen or taking and giving. Through these practices many lepers were able to cure themselves. After overhearing Chekhawa Yeshe Dorje's teaching to lepers on training the mind, his brother who strongly disliked Dharma teachings even began to put them into practice and receive great benefit from them.

As a result of these successes, Chekhawa Yeshe Dorje decided not to keep these teachings secret any longer and he composed Training the Mind in Seven Points. This is one of the essential root texts of the Kadampa tradition and was the basis for Je Tsongkhapa's text Sunrays of Training the Mind, which is regarded as one of the most authoritative commentaries on training the mind.

Chekhawa Yeshe Dorje's conclusion of Training the Mind in Seven Points is as follows:

Because of my many wishes,
Having endured suffering and a bad reputation,
I received the instructions for controlling self-grasping.
Now, if I die, I have no regrets.

== Root Verses ==
Root Verses Of The Seven Point Mind Training
by Geshe Chekawa (1102–1176)

Homage to Great Compassion.

These instructions are the essence of the nectar.
They have been passed down from Serlingpa.
They are like a diamond, the sun, and a medicinal tree.
Understand the purpose and so forth of these texts.
When the five degenerations are flourishing, transform
them into the path to enlightenment.

One: Preliminary Supporting Dharma Practices
Initially, train in the preliminaries.

Two: Training The Mind In The Path To Enlightenment
Training in relative bodhicitta
Put all the blame on the one.
Meditate on everyone as kind.
Train alternately in the two, taking and giving.
Begin taking with yourself.
Mount the two upon the breath.
There are three objects, three poisons, and three roots of virtue.
These, in brief, are the instructions for the post-meditation period.
Be mindful in order to admonish yourself.
Train yourself with the verses during all activities.

Training in ultimate bodhicitta
Having attained stability, be shown the secret.
Consider phenomena to be like a dream.
Analyze the nature of ungenerated awareness.
Even the antidote itself is naturally free.
Focus on the nature of the basis of all, the entity of the path.
Between sessions be an illusionist.

Three: Bringing Unfavorable Conditions Into The Path To Enlightenment
When the vessel and its contents are filled with negativities,
Transform these unfavorable conditions into the path to enlightenment.
Immediately apply whatever you meet to meditation.
Possess the four preparations, the supreme method.

Four: Integrating The Practices In A Single Lifetime
In brief, the essence of the instructions is to apply the five forces.
The Great Vehicle instructions on transference
are those very five forces; cherish this behavior.

Five: The Measure Of A Trained Mind
Combine all the Dharma into one intention.
Of the two witnesses, rely on the primary one.
Always rely on mental happiness alone.
The measure of being trained is to no longer regress.
To be trained is to possess the five signs of greatness.
You are trained when able even if distracted.

Six: The Commitments Of Mind Training
1. Constantly train in the three general points.
2. Change your attitude, but remain natural.
3. Do not mention [others’] impaired limbs.
4. Do not think about others’ affairs.
5. Initially, purify whatever affliction is the strongest.
6. Give up all hope of reward.
7. Avoid poisoned food.
8. Do not hold a grudge.
9. Do not respond to malicious talk.
10. Do not lie in ambush.
11. Do not strike to the core.
12. Do not put the load of a dzo on an ox.
13. Do not aim to win the race.
14. Do not use perverse means.
15. Do not turn a god into a demon.
16. Do not seek [others’] suffering as a means to your own happiness.

Seven: Advice Regarding Mind Training
1. Perform all yogas with the one.
2. Apply the one to all perverse oppressors.
3. Do the two activities, one at the beginning and one at the end.
4. Be patient whichever of the two occurs.
5. Guard the two at the risk of your life.
6. Train in the three difficult ones.
7. Obtain the three principal causes.
8. Cultivate the three without deterioration.
9. Possess the three without separation.
10. Train in purity and impartiality with respect to objects.
11. Cherish all of the encompassing and profound trainings.
12. Meditate constantly on the special cases.
13. Do not look for other conditions.
14. Practice the most important right now.
15. Avoid the distorted understandings.
16. Do not be erratic.
17. Train continuously.
18. Attain liberation with the two, investigation and analysis.
19. Do not boast.
20. Refrain from retaliating.
21. Do not act impetuously.
22. Do not wish for gratitude.
