= Svabhava =

Hindu and Buddhist concept and term

Svabhava (Sanskrit: स्वभाव, svabhāva; Pali: सभाव, sabhāva; Chinese: 自性; pinyin: zìxìng; Vietnamese: Tự tính; Tibetan: རང་བཞིན, Wylie: rang-bzhin) literally means "own-being" or "own-becoming". It is the intrinsic nature, essential nature or essence of beings.

The concept and term svabhāva are frequently encountered in Hindu and Buddhist traditions such as Advaita Vedanta (e.g. in the Avadhūta Gītā), Mahāyāna Buddhism (e.g. in the Ratnagotravibhāga), Vaishnavism (e.g., the writings of Ramanuja) and Dzogchen (e.g. in the seventeen tantras).

In the nondual Advaita Vedānta yoga text, Avadhūta Gītā, Brahman (in the Upanishadic denotation) is the svabhāva.

In the Mahāyāna Buddhadharma tradition(s) it is one of a suite of terms employed to denote the Buddha-nature, such as "gotra".

== Hindu philosophy ==
The term first appears in the Shvetashvatara Upanishad, as a possible first cause (jagatkāraṇa). There also seems to have been an Indian philosophical position called Svabhāvavada which was akin to naturalism which held that "things are as their nature makes them". It is possible this position was similar to or associated with Carvaka.

=== Samkhya ===
In early sāṃkhya philosophy, svabhāva was a term which was associated with prakṛti. It is the inherent capacity of prakṛti, which is independent and self caused.

=== Vaishnavism ===
The Bhagavad Gītā (18.41) has nature (svabhāva) as a distinguishing quality differentiating the varṇā.

Overzee (1992: p. 74) in her work on Pierre Teilhard de Chardin (1881–1955) and Rāmānuja (1017–1137) highlights Rāmānuja's usage of svabhāva in relation to Brahman thus:

Let us look more closely at what Rāmānuja means by the Lord's "nature". If you read his writings, you will find that he uses two distinct yet related words when referring to the nature of Brahman: svarūpa and svabhāva.

== Buddhism ==
In early Theravādin texts, the term "svabhāva" did not carry the technical meaning or the soteriological weight of later writings. Much of Mahāyāna Buddhism (as in the Prajñāpāramitā Sūtra) denies outright that such a svabhāva exists within any being; however, while in the tathāgatagarbha sūtras, notably the Mahāyāna Mahāparinirvāṇa Sūtra, the Buddha states that the immortal and infinite Buddha-nature - or "true self" of the Buddha - is the indestructible svabhāva of beings, this position is clarified in the Śrīmālādevī Siṃhanāda Sūtra, which directly states that "tathāgatagarbha is not a substantial self, nor a living being, nor ‘fate,’ nor a person."

=== Theravāda ===
In the Pāli Canon, sabhāva is absent from what are generally considered to be the earliest texts. When found in later texts (e.g., the paracanonical Milindapañha), it generically refers to (state of) mind, character or truth.

In the post-canonical Abhidhamma literature, sabhāva is used to distinguish a reducible, dependent, momentary phenomenon (dhamma) from a conventionally constructed object. Thus, a collection of visual and tactile phenomena might be mentally constructed into what is conventionally referred to as a "table"; but, beyond its constituent elements, a construct such as "table" lacks intrinsic existence (sabhāva).

According to Peter Harvey, sabhāva in the Theravāda Abhidhamma is something conditional and interdependent:

"They are dhammas because they uphold their own nature [sabhaava]. They are dhammas because they are upheld by conditions or they are upheld according to their own nature" (Asl.39). Here 'own-nature' would mean characteristic nature, which is not something inherent in a dhamma as a separate ultimate reality, but arise due to the supporting conditions both of other dhammas and previous occurrences of that dhamma. This is of significance as it makes the Mahayana critique of the Sarvastivadin's notion of own-nature largely irrelevant to the Theravada.

=== Vaibhāṣika ===
The Vaibhāṣika school held that dharmas have a constant essence or inherent nature (svabhāva) which persists through past, present and future. The term was also identified as a unique mark or own characteristic (svalaksana) that differentiated a dharma and remained unchangeable throughout its existence. According to Vaibhāṣikas, svabhavas are those things that exist substantially (dravyasat) as opposed to those things which are made up of aggregations of dharmas and thus only have a nominal existence (prajñaptisat).

=== Madhyamaka ===
Robinson (1957: p. 300) in discussing the Buddhist logic of Nāgārjuna, states:

Svabhāva is by definition the subject of contradictory ascriptions. If it exists, it must belong to an existent entity, which means that it must be conditioned, dependent on other entities, and possessed of causes. But a svabhāva is by definition unconditioned, not dependent on other entities, and not caused. Thus the existence of a svabhāva is impossible.

=== Dzogchen ===
Dzogchen upholds a view of niḥsvabhāva, refuting svabhāva using the same logic employed by Madhyamaka, a freedom from extremes demonstrated succinctly via catuṣkoṭi tetralemma.

As it (rigpa) transcends awareness and non-awareness, there are not even the imputations of awareness. This is called the Dzogpa Chenpo, free from extremes.

In the context of logical analysis, Dzogchen agrees with the view of Madhyamaka as elucidated by Nāgārjuna, Chögyal Namkhai Norbu explains:

...Madhyamaka explains with the four "beyond concepts," which are that something neither exists, nor does not exist, nor both exists and does not exist, nor is beyond both existing and not existing together. These are the four possibilities. What remains? Nothing. Although we are working only in an intellectual way, this can be considered the ultimate conclusion in Madhyamaka. As an analytical method, this is also correct for Dzogchen. Nagarjuna's reasoning is supreme.

The Union of the Sun and Moon (Tibetan: ཉི་ཟླ་ཁ་སྦྱོར, Wylie: nyi zla kha sbyor), one of the 'seventeen tantras of the esoteric instruction cycle' (Tibetan: མན་ངག་སྡེའི་རྒྱུད་བཅུ་བདུན, Wylie: man ngag sde'i rgyud bcu bdun) which are a suite of tantras known variously as: nyingtik, upadesha or menngagde within Dzogchen discourse, states:

Whoever meditates on the absence of nature [svabhāva]

in objects that are objective appearances
this is the non-duality of appearance and emptiness,

the relaxed unimpeded group of six.

==== Bonpo Dzogchen ====
Svabhāva is very important in the nontheistic theology of the Bonpo Great Perfection (Dzogchen) tradition where it is part of a technical language to render macrocosm and microcosm into nonduality, as Rossi (1999: p. 58) states:

The View of the Great Perfection further acknowledges the ontological identity of the macrocosmic and microcosmic realities through the threefold axiom of Condition (ngang), Ultimate Nature (rang bzhin) and Identity (bdag nyid). The Condition (ngang) is the Basis of all (kun gzhi) -- primordially pure (ka dag) and not generated by primary and instrumental causes. It is the origin of all phenomena. The Ultimate Nature (rang bzhin) is said to be unaltered (ma bcos pa), because the Basis [gzhi] is spontaneously accomplished (lhun grub) in terms of its innate potential (rtsal) for manifestation (rol pa). The non-duality between the Ultimate Nature (i.e., the unaltered appearance of all phenomena) and the Condition (i.e., the Basis of all) is called the Identity (bdag nyid). This unicum of primordial purity (ka dag) and spontaneous accomplishment (lhun grub) is the Way of Being (gnas lugs) of the Pure-and-Perfect-Mind [byang chub (kyi) sems].

==== The Mirror of the Mind of Samantabhadra ====
The term "svabhāva" is mentioned in six verses of the first chapter of the Avadhūta Gītā: 1.5, 1.6, 1.44, 1.54, 1.58, 1.76.

This extreme nondual yoga text shares a lot of common language with the extreme nondual yoga of Atiyoga (Dzogchen) and its standard Tibetan analogue rang-bzhin (Wylie) is employed in The Mirror of the Mind of Samantabhadra, one of the Seventeen Tantras of Atiyoga Upadesha.

Dzogchen strictly refutes the notion of "svabhāva", and so The Mirror of the Mind of Samantabhadra, states specifically that dharmakāya is non-arisen and natureless:

...this meaningful supreme wisdom kāya

ultimate, natureless [rang bzhin med], the state of the nonarising dharmakāya,
the lamp of the teachings, the great light of the dharmakāya

manifests to persons who are in accord with the meaning.

The following quotation from The Mirror of the Mind of Samantabhadra is drawn from the Lungi Terdzö: (Note: The Lungi Terdzö (Wylie: lung-gi gter-mdzod) is the prose autocommentary by Longchenpa (1308–1364 or possibly 1369) to his Chöying Dzö (Wylie: chos-dbyings mdzod) -- which are numbered amongst the Seven Treasuries (Wylie: mdzod chen bdun). This text is rendered into English by Barron, 'et al.' (2001: p. 8) and the Wylie has been secured from Wikisource and interspersed and embedded in the English gloss for probity)

You should understand that the nature of all phenomena is that of the five aspects of Samantabhadra.

What are these? you ask
They are Samantabhadra as nature,
Samantabhadra as adornment,
Samantabhadra as teacher,
Samantabhadra as awareness, and

Samantabhadra as realization . (Note: chos thams cad kun tu bzang po lnga'i rang bzhin du shes par bya'o de yang gang zhe na 'di lta ste rang bzhin kun tu bzang po dang rgyan kun tu bzang po dang ston pa kun tu bzang po dang rig pa kun tu bzang po dang togs pa kun tu bzang po'o.)

==== Namkhai Norbu ====
Dzogchen teacher Namkhai Norbu (2001: p. 155) in discussing the view of the pratyekabuddhas states that:

... the Pratyekabuddhas accede to the absence of a self or independent self-nature (bdag med).

== See also ==
- Ahamkara
- Atman (Buddhism)
- Chöd
- Mahayana
- Mindstream
- Sunyata
- Anatman (Hinduism)
- Substance theory
- Qualia

== Sources ==
- Gethin, R.M.L. (1992). The Buddhist Path to Awakening: A Study of the Bodhi-Pakkhiyā Dhammā. Leiden: E.J. Brill. ISBN 90-04-09442-3.
- Y Karunadasa, (1996). The Dhamma Theory: Philosophical Cornerstone of the Abhidhamma (WH 412/413). Kandy: Buddhist Publication Society. Retrieved 2008-06-30 from "BPS" (transcribed 2007) at
- Red Pine (2004). The Heart Sutra. Emeryville, CA: Shoemaker & Hoard. ISBN 1-59376-009-4.
- McRae, John (2004), The Sutra of Queen Śrīmālā of the Lion's Roar and the Vimalakīrti Sutra (PDF), Berkeley, CA: Numata Center for Buddhist Translation and Research, ISBN 1886439311
- Rhys Davids, Caroline A. F. ([1900], 2003). Buddhist Manual of Psychological Ethics, of the Fourth Century B.C., Being a Translation, now made for the First Time, from the Original Pāli, of the First Book of the Abhidhamma-Piṭaka, entitled Dhamma-Saṅgaṇi (Compendium of States or Phenomena). Whitefish, MT: Kessinger Publishing. ISBN 0-7661-4702-9.
- Rhys Davids, T.W. & William Stede (eds.) (1921–25). The Pali Text Society's Pali-English Dictionary. Chipstead: Pali Text Society.
- Walshe, Maurice (1987, 1995). The Long Discourses of the Buddha: A Translation of the Digha Nikaya. Boston: Wisdom Publications. ISBN 0-86171-103-3.
- Williams, Paul (1989; repr. 2007). Mahayana Buddhism: The Doctrinal Foundations. London: Routledge. ISBN 978-0-415-02537-9.
- Yamamoto, Kosho (tr.), Page, Tony (ed.) (1999–2000).The Mahayana Mahaparinirvana Sutra in 12 volumes. London: Nirvana Publications
