= The Mirror of the Mind of Samantabhadra =

The Mirror of the Mind of Samantabhadra (Tibetan: ཀུན་ཏུ་བཟང་པོ་ཐུགས་ཀྱི་མེ་ལོང, Wylie: kun tu bzang po thugs kyi me long) is one of the Seventeen tantras of Dzogchen Upadesha.

== English discourse ==
In the Lungi Terdzö (Wylie: lung gi gter mdzod) the prose autocommentary by Longchenpa (1308 – 1364 or possibly 1369) to his Chöying Dzö (Wylie: chos dbyings mdzod) -- which are numbered amongst the Seven Treasuries (Wylie: mdzod chen bdun) -- the following embedded quotation from this Tantra has been rendered into English by Barron, et al. (2001: p. 8) and the Wylie has been secured from Wikisource and interspersed and embedded in the English gloss for probity:

"You should understand that the nature of all phenomena is that of the five aspects of Samantabhadra [chos thams cad kun tu bzang po lnga'i rang bzhin du shes par bya'o]. What are these? you ask [de yang gang zhe na 'di lta ste]. They are Samantabhadra as nature [rang bzhin kun tu bzang po dang], Samantabhadra as adornment [rgyan kun tu bzang po dang], Samantabhadra as teacher [ston pa kun tu bzang po dang], Samantabhadra as awareness [rig pa kun tu bzang po dang], and Samantabhadra as realization [rtogs pa kun tu bzang po'o]."

"Phenomena" in the abovementioned quotation should be understood as a rendering of dharmas (Sanskrit) which may also be glossed "constituent factors". "Nature" (rang bzhin) is an analogue of svabhava (Sanskrit). "Awareness" is a gloss of rigpa (Tibetan). Though Buddhism is for the most part non-theistic, Dzogchen and other Buddhadharma traditions often personify attributes or qualities with a deity in textual discourse as Samantabhadra herein is the Adi-Buddha (to be clearly discerned from the namesake Bodhisattva) and is iconographically "attributeless" and "unadorned", the "primordial Buddha", and Samantabhadra is often so for many textual traditions of Dzogchen in both lineagues of Bonpo and Nyingmapa. Following Longchenpa, wherever Samantabhadra is Samantabhadri is evident indivisibly in Yab-yum (Tibetan).

== Primary resources ==
- Kun tu bzang po thugs kyi me long gi rgyud in Wylie @ Wikisource
- ཀུན་ཏུ་བཟང་པོ་ཐུགས་ཀྱི་མེ་ལོང་གི་རྒྱུད in Tibetan Script (Uchen) Unicode @ Wikisource
