= Jacob P. Dalton =

American professor of religion and Tibetan studies

Jacob P. Dalton is an American professor of religion and Tibetan studies at the University of California at Berkeley, where he is the first holder of a chair endowed by the Khyentse Foundation. He had previously worked as a professor at Yale University and a researcher at the British Library.

Dalton's research focuses on Tantra in Tibet during the 11th century as it can be studied using the cache of documents found at Dunhuang. He has also done pioneering work on Tibetan paleography.

== Bibliography ==
=== Books ===
- The Gathering of Intentions: A History of a Tibetan Tantra. New York: Columbia University Press, 2016.
- Taming of the Demons: Violence and Liberation in Tibetan Buddhism. New Haven: Yale University Press, 2011.
- Tibetan Tantric Manuscripts from Dunhuang: A Descriptive Catalogue of the Stein Collection at the British Library. Co-authored with Sam van Schaik. Leiden: Brill, 2006.

=== Articles ===
- “The Questions and Answers of Vajrasattva.” In: David G. White, ed., Yoga in Practice. Princeton: Princeton University Press, 2011, pp. 185–203.
- “Mahayoga Ritual Interests at Dunhuang: A Translation and Study of the Codex IOL Tib J 437/Pelliot tibétain 324.” In: Yoshiro Imaeda, Matthew Kapstein, and Tsuguhito Takeuchi, eds., New Studies of the Old Tibetan Documents: Philology, History and Religion. Tokyo: Research Institute for Languages and Cultures of Asia and Africa, 2011, pp. 293–313.
- “Beyond Anonymity: Paleographic Analyses of the Dunhuang Manuscripts.” Co-authored with Tom Davis and Sam van Schaik. In: Journal of the International Association of Tibetan Studies; no. 3 (2007): 1-23.
- “Recreating the Rnying ma School: the Mdo dbang Tradition of Smin grol gling.” In: Bryan Cuevas and Kurtis Schaeffer, eds., Power, Politics, and the Reinvention of Tradition in Seventeenth and Eighteenth Century Tibet. Leiden: Brill, 2006, pp. 91–101.
- “A Crisis of Doxography: How Tibetans Organized Tantra during the 8th-12th Centuries.” In: Journal of the International Association of Buddhist Studies; 28.1 (2005): 115-181.
- “The Early Development of the Padmasambhava Legend in Tibet.” In: Journal of the American Oriental Society; 124.4 (2004): 759-772.
- “The Development of Perfection: The Interiorization of Buddhist Ritual in the Eighth and Ninth Centuries.” In: Journal of Indian Philosophy; 32.1 (2004): 1-30.
- “Where Chan and Tantra Meet: Buddhist Syncretism in Dunhuang.” Co-authored with Sam van Schaik. In Susan Whitfield, ed., The Silk Road: Trade, Travel, War and Faith. Chicago: Serindia Publications, 2004, pp. 63–71.
- “Lighting the Lamp: An Examination of the Structure of the Bsam gtan mig sgron.” Co-authored with Sam van Schaik. In: Acta Orientalia; vol. 64 (2003): 153-175.
- “Nyingma,” “Dakini,” “Longchenpa,” “Padmasambhava,” “Samye,” “Samye Debate.” In: Encyclopaedia of Buddhism. New York: Macmillan Reference, 2003.
