= Nelug Dzö =

Nelug Dzö (Tibetan: གནས་ལུགས་མཛོད, Wylie: gnas lugs mdzod) is a poetic vignette written in Classical Tibetan and one of the Seven Treasuries of Longchenpa. Longchenpa wrote Desum Nyingpo (Wylie: sde gsum snying po), a prose autocommentary to this work. Keith Dowman considers it a "magical psychotropic poem".

== Etymology ==
Sanskrit title in IAST: Tathātva-ratna-koṣa-nāma.

Importantly, the Tibetan Wylie "gnas lugs" is the analogue of the Sanskrit IAST "tathātva". The online dictionary of the Tibetan and Himalayan Library identifies "tathātva" (literally, "thusness") as synonymous with tathatā and dharmatā.

== Outline of text ==
Rigpa Shedra provides an English text outline following the translation by Barron, from whom the Tibetan was sourced, as follows:

1. The Theme of 'Ineffability' (Tibetan: མེད་པ, Wylie: med pa)
2. The Theme of 'Openness' (Tibetan: ཕྱལ་བ, Wylie: phyal ba)
3. The Theme of 'Spontaneous Presence' (Tibetan: ལྷུན་གྲུབ, Wylie: lhun grub)
4. The Theme of 'Oneness' (Tibetan: གཅིག་པུ, Wylie: gcig pu)
5. The Individuals to Whom These Teachings May Be Entrusted

== Intertextuality and themes ==
The majority of quotations cited by Longchenpa in the Desum Nyingpo are drawn from the tantras of the Nyingma Gyubum (Wylie: rnying ma rgyud 'bum) ('Collected Tantras of the Ancients'). Out of the Nyingma Gyubum the most quoted tantra in the Desum Nyingpo is the Kunjed Gyalpo (Wylie: kun byed rgyal po), the principal tantra of Semde (Wylie: sems sde), the 'mind series' of Dzogchen. Sixteen of the Seventeen Tantras of the Upadesha-varga are quoted at least once in the Desum Nyingpo and the most cited is the principal tantra of this class, the Drataljur or Reverberation of Sound (Tibetan: སྒྲ་ཐལ་འགྱུར, Wylie: sgra thal 'gyur).

== English translations ==
In 1998, Richard Barron rendered the text into English with his translation of the Nelug Dzö in free verse with the Tibetan verse on the facing page along with its prose autocommentary by Longchenpa, the Desum Nyingpo, with both works within the one bound volume. The numerous embedded quotations from the Seventeen Tantras were referenced and checked by Barron against the edition printed at Adzom Chögar in eastern Tibet. Keith Dowman has also translated the text.

- Longchenpa (2001) [1998]. Fairclough, Susanne (ed.). The Precious Treasury of the Way of Abiding. Translated by Richard Barron. Padma Publishing. ISBN 978-1881847328.
- Longchenpa (2006). Old Man Basking In the Sun: Longchenpa's Treasury of Natural Perfection. Translated by Keith Dowman. Vajra Publications. ISBN 978-9994664498.
- Longchenpa (2010). Natural Perfection: Longchenpa's Radical Dzogchen. Translated by Keith Dowman. Wisdom Publications. ISBN 978-0861716401.
