= Auspicious =

Auspicious is a word derived from Latin originally pertaining to the taking of 'auspices' by an augur of ancient Rome. It may refer to:

- Luck, a phenomenon or belief that humans may associate with experiencing improbable events, especially improbably positive or negative events
- Auspicious dreams in Jainism, fourteen or sixteen dreams described in Jainism
- Auspicious Incident, the forced disbandment of the Janissary corps by Ottoman sultan Mahmud II
- An auspicious number in numerology
- Auspicious Tantra of All-Reaching Union, a set of nine volumes of Chinese Buddhist printed texts
- Auspicious train ticket, a train ticket with an auspicious message on it derived from the beginning and end stations on the ticket
- Auspicious wedding dates, lucky times to get married
- Ashtamangala, the sacred set of Eight Auspicious Signs featured in a number of Indian religions
- Great Auspicious Beauty Tantra, a tantra in the Nyingma school of Tibetan Buddhism
- In English discourse on aspects of Chinese culture, the word "auspicious" is a significant concept in:
  - Chinese New Year, a holiday that marks the beginning of a new year on the traditional lunisolar Chinese calendar
  - Chinese numerology, a Chinese system of belief in lucky and unlucky numbers
  - Feng shui, a traditional form of geomancy that originated in ancient China
  - Song to the Auspicious Cloud, two historical national anthems of the Republic of China
- In Thai culture:
  - The Ancient and Auspicious Order of the Nine Gems, a Thai order of chivalry
  - The Most Auspicious Order of the Rajamitrabhorn, a Thai order of chivalry

== See also ==
- Faust (Latin: faustus, lit. 'favorable', 'fortunate' or 'auspicious'), the protagonist of a classic German legend based on the historical Johann Georg Faust
- Shiva (Sanskrit: शिव, romanized: Śiva, lit. 'The Auspicious One'), one of the principal deities of Hinduism
