= View (Dzogchen) =

One Dharma of the Path of Dzogchen

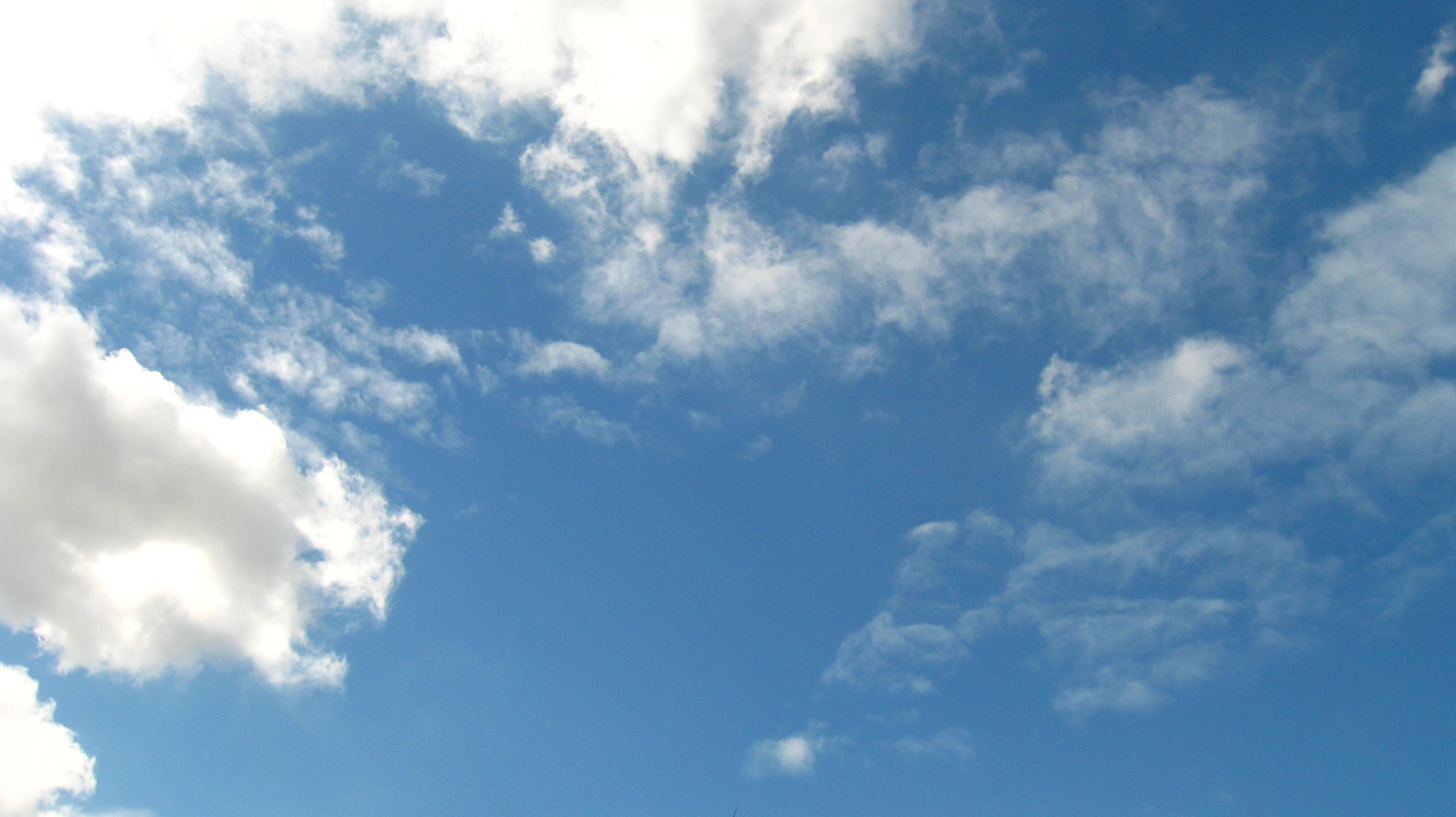
The metaphors of sky and spaciousness are often used to describe the nature of mind in Dzogchen.

In Dzogchen, the view (Tib. tawa) is one of the Three Dharmas of the Path of Dzogchen. The other two dharmas of the path are practice (gompa) and conduct (chöpa).

== Terminology ==
Nyingma Dzogchen texts use unique terminology to describe the Dzogchen view (Tib. tawa). Some of these terms deal with the different elements and features of the mind and are drawn from classic Buddhist thought. The generic term for consciousness is shes pa (Skt. vijñāna), and includes the six sense consciousnesses. Worldly, impure and dualistic forms of consciousness are generally referred to with terms such as sems (citta, mind), yid (mānas) and blo (buddhi). On the other hand, nirvanic or liberated forms of consciousness are described with terms such as ye shes (jñāna, 'pristine consciousness') and shes rab (prajñā, wisdom). According to Sam van Schaik, two significant terms used in Dzogchen literature is the ground (gzhi) and gnosis (rig pa), which represent the "ontological and gnoseological aspects of the nirvanic state" respectively.

Nyingma Dzogchen literature also describes nirvana as the "expanse" or "space" (klong or dbyings) or the "expanse of Dharma" (chos dbyings, Sanskrit: Dharmadhatu). The term Dharmakaya (Dharma body) is also often associated with these terms in Dzogchen, as explained by Tulku Urgyen:

Dharmakaya is like space. You cannot say there is any limit to space in any direction. No matter how far you go, you never reach a point where space stops and that is the end of space. Space is infinite in all directions; so is dharmakaya. Dharmakaya is all-pervasive and totally infinite, beyond any confines or limitations. This is so for the dharmakaya of all buddhas. There is no individual dharmakaya for each buddha, as there is no individual space for each country.

== Rigpa (knowledge) and ma rigpa (delusion) ==
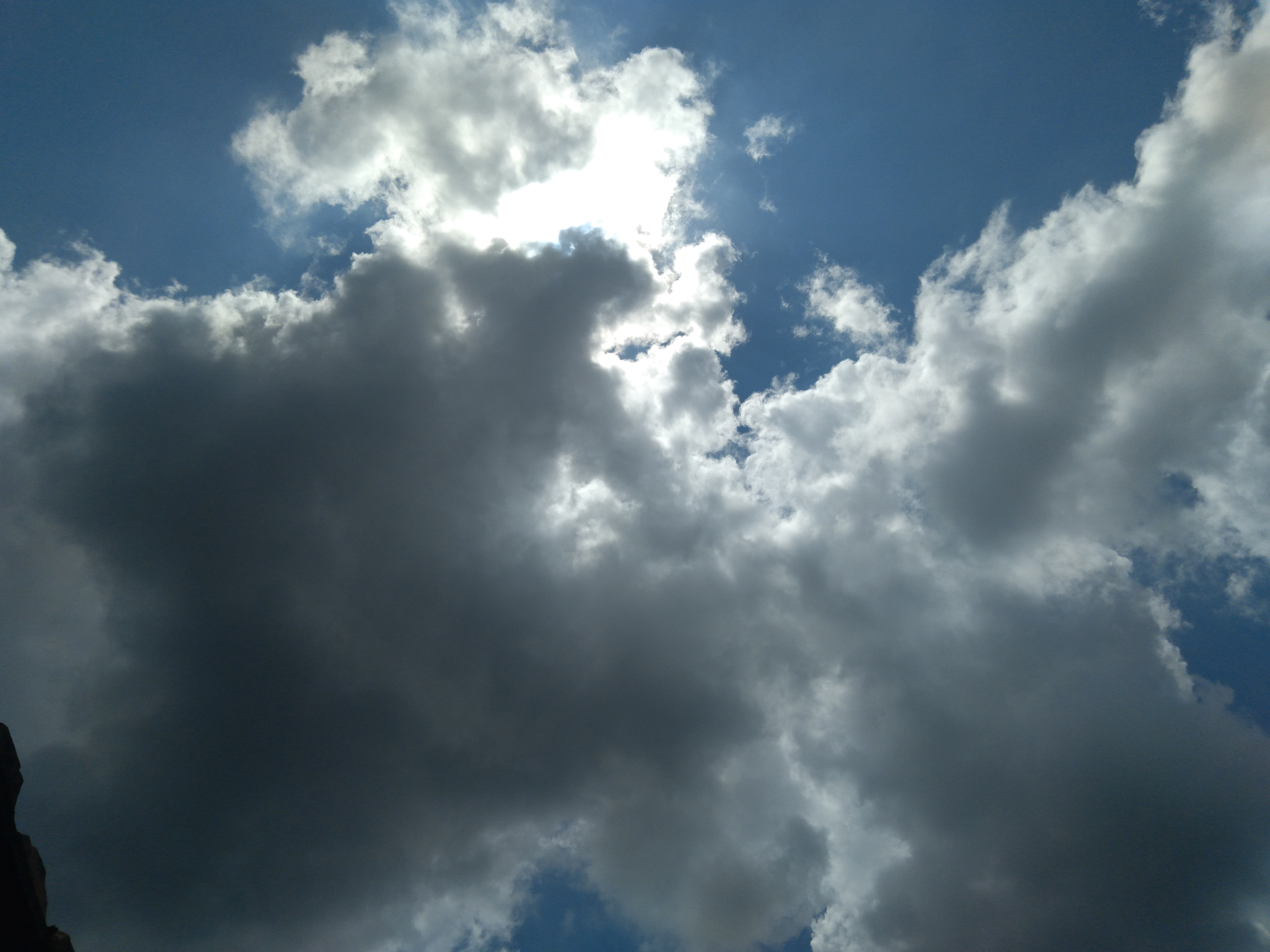
A widespread simile for ignorance is the obscuration of the sun by clouds

Rigpa is the knowledge of the fundamental ground. It has also come to mean the 'pristine awareness' that is the ground itself. Erik Pema Kunsang translates a text which provides basic definitions of rigpa and ma rigpa in a Dzogchen context:

Unknowing (marigpa) is not knowing the nature of mind. Knowing (rigpa) is the knowing of the original wakefulness that is personal experience.

Rigpa has two aspects, namely kadag and lhun grub. Kadag means 'purity' or specifically 'primordial purity.' Lhun grub in Tibetan normally implies automatic, self-caused or spontaneous actions or processes. As quality of rigpa it means 'spontaneous presence.'

Ma rigpa (avidyā) is the opposite of rigpa or knowledge. Ma rigpa is ignorance, delusion or unawareness, the failure to recognize the nature of the basis. An important theme in Dzogchen texts is explaining how ignorance arises from the basis or Dharmata, which is associated with ye shes or pristine consciousness. Automatically arising unawareness (lhan-skyes ma-rigpa) exists because the basis has a natural cognitive potentiality which gives rise to appearances. This is the ground for samsara and nirvana.

== Eleven vajra topics ==
The Dzogchen view of the secret instruction series (man ngag sde) is classically explained through the eleven vajra topics. These can be found in the String of Pearls Tantra (Mu tig phreng ba), the Great Commentary by Vimalamitra as well as in Longchenpa's Treasury of Word and Meaning (Tsik Dön Dzö).

== See also ==
- Ground (Dzogchen)
- Path (Dzogchen)
- Fruit (Dzogchen)
