= Bryan J. Cuevas =

American Tibetologist and historian of religion

Bryan J. Cuevas (born 1967) is an American Tibetologist and historian of religion. He is John F. Priest Professor of Religion and Director of Buddhist and Tibetan Studies at Florida State University, where he specializes in Tibetan Buddhist history, literature, and culture. His research focuses on Tibetan history and historiography, hagiography and biographical literature, Buddhist popular religion, the literary history of death narratives and death-related practices, and the politics of magic and ritual power in premodern Tibetan societies, from roughly the eleventh through the early eighteenth centuries.

== Education ==
Cuevas was born in Atlanta, Georgia. He received his B.A. degree in Philosophy in 1989 from Emory University, and his M.A. (1993) and Ph.D. (2000) degrees in History of Religions and Buddhist and Tibetan Studies from the University of Virginia.

== Academic career ==
In addition to his current position at FSU, Cuevas has been a Member of the Institute for Advanced Study and has held visiting appointments at the École pratique des hautes études in Paris, University of California, Berkeley and Princeton University. He has served on the editorial board of the Journal of the American Academy of Religion and has been book review editor for the Journal of the International Association of Tibetan Studies. His work has received fellowship support from the John Simon Guggenheim Memorial Foundation, the National Endowment for the Humanities, the Center for the Study of Religion at Princeton University, and the American Institute of Indian Studies.

== Select bibliography ==
- The Rwa pod and Other ‘Lost’ Works of Rwa lo tsā ba’s Vajrabhairava Tradition: A Catalogue of Recently Acquired Tibetan Manuscripts from Mongolia and Khams and Their Significance. Wiener Studien zur Tibetologie und Buddhismuskunde 101. Arbeitkreis für tibetische und buddhistische Studien Universität Wien, 2021.
- The All-Pervading Melodious Drumbeat: The Life of Ra Lotsawa. Translation with introduction and notes. New York: Penguin Classics, 2015.
- Travels in the Netherworld: Buddhist Popular Narratives of Death and the Afterlife in Tibet. New York: Oxford University Press, 2008 (Paperback edition, 2011).
- The Buddhist Dead: Practices, Discourses, Representations. Co-edited with Jacqueline I. Stone. Kuroda Studies in East Asian Buddhism Series 20. Honolulu: University of Hawai'i Press, 2007 (Paperback edition, 2011).
- Power, Politics, and the Reinvention of Tradition: Tibet in the Seventeenth and Eighteenth Centuries. Co-edited with Kurtis R. Schaeffer. Leiden: Brill, 2006.
- The Hidden History of the Tibetan Book of the Dead. New York: Oxford University Press, 2003 (Paperback edition, 2006).
