= Great Beauty =

Great Beauty may refer to:

- Great oak beauty or Hypomecis roboraria, a moth of the family Geometridae
- Great Auspicious Beauty, one of Seventeen Tantras of Menngagde, styles of meditation and ritual
- A Great and Terrible Beauty, 2003 fantasy novel by Libba Bray
- The Great Beauty, 2013 Italian film
- "Great Beauty", a song by the Cat Empire

== See also ==
- Four Great Beauties, four ancient Chinese women
