= Great Auspicious Beauty Tantra =

The Great Auspicious Beauty Tantra or Trashi Dzenden Chenpögyü (Tibetan: བཀྲ་ཤིས་མཛེས་ལྡན་ཆེན་པོའི་རྒྱུད, Wylie: bkra shis mdzes ldan chen po'i rgyud) is numbered amongst the 'Seventeen Tantras of Menngagde' (Tibetan: མན་ངག་སྡེའི་རྒྱུད་བཅུ་བདུན, Wylie: man ngag sde'i rgyud bcu bdun) within Dzogchen discourse and is part of the textual support for the Vima Nyingtik.

Kunsang (1987, 2007: p. 88) provides the following summary of this Dzogchen tantra thus:

"...[it] teaches how to establish the nature of awareness and how to identify the basis of confusion and the unmistaken wisdom."

These Seventeen Tantras are to be found in the Canon of the Ancient School, the 'Nyingma Gyubum' (Tibetan: རྙིང་མ་རྒྱུད་འབུམ, Wylie: rnying ma rgyud 'bum), volumes 9 and 10, folio numbers 143-159 of the edition edited by 'Jamyang Khyentse Rinpoche' commonly known as Dilgo Khyentse Rinpoche (Thimpu, Bhutan, 1973), reproduced from the manuscript preserved at 'Tingkye Gonpa Jang' (Tibetan: གཏིང་སྐྱེས་དགོན་པ་བྱང, Wylie: gting skyes dgon pa byang) Monastery in Tibet.

== Nomenclature, orthography and etymology ==
This tantra is rendered in English as "Tantra of Great Beauty and Auspiciousness" (1995, 2003: p. 210) within the English translation of the first book of the Sheja Dzö of Jamgon Kongtrul (1813-1899) entitled in English Myriad Worlds.

== English discourse ==
Kapstein (1992: p. 64) opens the discourse of this Tantra into English with a quotation embedded within Longchenpa's Tegchö Dzö (Wylie: theg mchog mdzod; fol. 3b-4a) which Kapstein renders into English as follows wherein the Adi Buddha, Samantabhadra, voices:

Though I am free from bewilderment, bewilderment has emerged from my expressive power. Though I do not come into being as ground, my nature having arisen without impediment, unawareness has spontaneously emerged from my spirituality that is without determination. Just as clouds do not intrinsically exist in the sky, but emerge fortuitously, so there is no unawareness at all that belongs to the ground.

The following English rendering of a quotation from the Great Auspicious Beauty was embedded in the Sheja Dzö of Jamgon Kongtrul (1813-1899) and specifically the section of the Sheja Dzö translated into English entitled Myriad Worlds (1995, 2003: p. 210), and the Tibetan Wylie was sourced from Wikisource:

Unceasing space is [the gate through which the ground of being] manifests as energy.
thugs rje ltar 'char ba'i go ma 'gags pa ཐུགས་རྗེ་ལྟར་འཆར་བའི་གོ་མ་འགགས་པ
Unceasing appearance is [the ground] manifesting as lights.
'od ltar 'char ba'i snang ba ma 'gags pa འོད་ལྟར་འཆར་བའི་སྣང་བ་མ་འགགས་པ
Unceasing enjoyment is [the ground] manifesting as pristine wisdom.
ye shes ltar 'char ba'i longs spyod ma 'gags pa ཡེ་ཤེས་ལྟར་འཆར་བའི་ལོངས་སྤྱོད་མ་འགགས་པ
Unceasing nature is [the ground] manifesting as dimensions of awakening.
sku ltar 'char ba'i ngo bo ma 'gags pa སྐུ་ལྟར་འཆར་བའི་ངོ་བོ་མ་འགགས་པ
Unceasing view is [the ground] manifesting as non-duality.
gnyis med ltar 'char ba'i lta ba ma nges pa གཉིས་མེད་ལྟར་འཆར་བའི་ལྟ་བ་མ་ངེས་པ
Unceasing method is [the ground] manifesting as freedom from limitations.
mtha' grol ltar 'char ba'i thabs ma 'gags pa'o མཐའ་གྲོལ་ལྟར་འཆར་བའི་ཐབས་མ་འགགས་པའོ
The purity of pristine wisdom is the gate to perfection.
dag pa ye shes kyi 'jug sgo mthar phyin pa དག་པ་ཡེ་ཤེས་ཀྱི་འཇུག་སྒོ་མཐར་ཕྱིན་པ
Unceasing energy is [the gate] to impure [cyclic life].
ma dag pa ltar 'char ba'i sgo thugs rje ma 'gags pa མ་དག་པ་ལྟར་འཆར་བའི་སྒོ་ཐུགས་རྗེ་མ་འགགས་པ
These [eight] are precious wish-fulfilling jewels.
'dod don nor bu rin po che lta bu ste འདོད་དོན་ནོར་བུ་རིན་པོ་ཆེ་ལྟ་བུ་སྟེ

These eight are also known as the 'Eight doors of spontaneous presence' (Tibetan: ལྷུན་གྲུབ་ཀྱི་སྒོ་བརྒྱད་, Wylie: lhun grub kyi sgo brgyad):

- compassion/energy (Tibetan: ཐུགས་རྗེ་, Wylie: thugs rje),
- lights (Tibetan: འོད་, Wylie: 'od),
- kayas (Tibetan: སྐུ་, Wylie: sku),
- wisdom, (Tibetan: ཡེ་ཤེས་, Wylie: ye shes),
- nonduality (Tibetan: གཉིས་མེད་, Wylie: gnyis med),
- freedom from extremes (Tibetan: མཐའ་གྲོལ་, Wylie: mtha' grol),
- the impure gate of samsara (Tibetan: མ་དག་པ་འཁོར་བའི་སྒོ་, Wylie: ma dag pa 'khor ba'i sgo), and
- the pure gate of wisdom (Tibetan: དག་པ་ཡེ་ཤེས་ཀྱི་སྒོ་, Wylie: dag pa ye shes kyi sgo).

== Primary resources ==
- Bkra shis mdzes ldan chen po'i rgyud in Wylie @ Wikisource
- བཀྲ་ཤིས་མཛེས་ལྡན་ཆེན་པོའི་རྒྱུད in Tibetan Script (Uchen) Unicode @ Wikisource
