= Reverberation of Sound Tantra =

The Reverberation of Sound Tantra (Tibetan: སྒྲ་ཐལ་འགྱུར, Wylie: sgra thal 'gyur), is considered to be the root tantra of the seventeen tantras of the Menngagde (esoteric Instruction) class of the Tibetan Buddhist Dzogchen tradition.

These tantras are found in the Nyingma Gyubum ("The Hundred Thousand Tantras of the Ancients"), volumes 9 and 10, folio numbers 143-159 of the edition edited by Dilgo Khyentse (Thimpu, Bhutan, 1973) of the gting skyes dgon pa byang manuscript.

== Title ==
The full title of the Drathalgyur (Tibetan: སྒྲ་ཐལ་འགྱུར, Wylie: sgra thal 'gyur) is: sGra-thal-’gyur chen po’i rgyud (Skt., Shabda maha prasamga mula tantra).

In English, "Drathalgyur" can be rendered as: All-Penetrating Sound, Unfolding of Sound, Reverberation of Sound, or Sound Consequence.

== Overview ==
The tantra deals with topics related to Dzogchen view and practice, especially as it relates to sound yoga (Nāda yoga). It also provides a Dzogchen perspective on the idea of the “primordial sound” (nāda). The tantra states that all spiritual teachings are manifestations of the original primordial sound. The tantra describes numerous esoteric Dzogchen practices, such as semdzin ("holding the mind").

The Drathalgyur also states that the theoretical view of Ati Yoga (Dzogchen) coincides with the Madhyamaka Prasangika view and that there is no contradiction between them.

There is a commentary on the tantra, titled the Illuminating Lamp, which is attributed to Vimalamitra.

Barron et al. (1998: pp. 208–209) render an embedded quotation of this tantra within their translation of Longchenpa's (1308 - 1364?) The Precious Treasury of the Way of Abiding that discusses a Dzogchen perspective of buddha-nature (sugata-garbha):

Moreover, owing to their circumstances, among ordinary beings there is not a single one who is not a buddha. Because their nature is in harmony with naturally occurring timeless awareness, samsara is never something existent. Therefore, each being is naturally a buddha. Once one realizes what the process of birth really is, abiding in the womb is the basic space of phenomena, the coming together of body and mind is the connection between basic space and awareness, and abiding in the body is the three kayas. Aging is the falling away of phenomena and the end of appearances based on confusion, illness is the experience of the nature of phenomena, and death is emptiness, impossible to identify. Therefore, ordinary beings are buddhas.
