= Gyurme Dorje =

Scottish Tibetologist (1950–2020)

- Born: 1950; Edinburgh, Scotland
- Died: 5 February 2020 (aged 69)
- Known for: Buddhist scholar, historian, translator, traveller and founding director of TransHimalaya

Gyurme Dorje (1950 – 5 February 2020) was a Scottish Tibetologist, translator, and writer.

== Early life ==
In Edinburgh he studied classics at George Watson's College and developed an early interest in Buddhist philosophy. He held a PhD in Tibetan Literature (SOAS) and an MA in Sanskrit with Oriental Studies (Edinburgh).

== Career ==
In the 1970s he spent a decade living in Tibetan communities in India and Nepal where he received extensive teachings from Kangyur Rinpoche, Dudjom Rinpoche, Chatral Rinpoche, and Dilgo Khyentse Rinpoche. In 1971 Dudjom Rinpoche encouraged him to begin translating his recently completed History of the Nyingma School (རྙིང་མའི་སྟན་པའི་ཆོས་འབྱུང་) and in 1980 his Fundamentals of the Nyingma School (བསྟན་པའི་རྣམ་གཞག) - together this was an undertaking that was to take twenty years, only reaching completion in 1991.

In the 1980s Gyurme returned to the UK and in 1987 completed his 3 volume doctoral dissertation on the Guhyagarbhatantra and Longchenpa's commentary on this text at the School of Oriental and African Studies (SOAS) at the University of London. From 1991 to 1996 Gyurme held research fellowships at London University, where he worked with Alak Zenkar Rinpoche and Dr. Heitmann, translator of the entire 3rd volume, on translating (with corrections) the content of the Great Sanskrit Tibetan Chinese Dictionary to create the three volume Encyclopaedic Tibetan-English Dictionary. He wrote, edited, translated and contributed to numerous important books on Tibetan religion and culture including The Nyingma School of Tibetan Buddhism: Its Fundamentals and History (2 vol.) (Wisdom, 1991), Tibetan Medical Paintings 2 vol. (Serindia, 1992), The Tibet Handbook (Footprint, 1996), the first complete translation of the Tibetan Book of the Dead, and A Handbook of Tibetan Culture (Shambhala, 1994). Gyurme was a Tsadra Foundation translator from 2007 until his passing in 2020 (Source Accessed February 11, 2025).

== Personal life ==
Gyurme Dorje was married to Xiaohong Dorje and lived in Crieff, Scotland. He had two daughters, Pema and Tinley, as well as a son, Orgyen.

He died February 5th, 2020 in Perth, Scotland.

== Published works ==
- Kongtrul, Jamgon: The One Hundred and Eight Teaching Manuals; Dorje, Gyurme (2020). Essential Teachings of the Eight Practice Lineages of Tibet, Volume 18. The Treasury of Precious Instructions. Boulder: Snow Lion, an imprint of Shambhala Publications. p. 736. ISBN 978-1559394604.
- Dorje, Choying Tobden; Dorje, Gyurme (2017). The Complete Nyingma Tradition from Sutra to Tantra, Book 13: Philosophical Systems and Lines of Transmission. Boulder: Snow Lion, an imprint of Shambhala Publications. pp. 1–672. ISBN 978-1559394604.
- Dorje, Choying Tobden; Dorje, Gyurme (2016). The Complete Nyingma Tradition from Sutra to Tantra, Books 15 to 17: The Essential Tantras of Mahayoga. Boulder: Snow Lion, an imprint of Shambhala Publications. pp. 1–1416. ISBN 978-1559394369.
- Dorje, Gyurme (1987). The Guhyagarbhatantra and its XIVth Century Commentary Phyogs-bcu mun-sel (Ph.D.). SOAS, University of London. (3 vols)
- Gyurme Dorje (1991) Dudjom Rinpoche's The Nyingma School of Tibetan Buddhism: Its Fundamentals and History. Boston, Wisdom Publications. 1st edition (2 vols), 1991; 2nd edition (1 vol), 2002; ISBN 0861711998.
- Tibetan Medical Paintings. Serindia Publications, London (2 Vols); ISBN 0-906026-26-1. 1992.
- Tibet Handbook. Footprint Handbooks, Bath. 1st edition, 1996; 2nd edition 1999; 3rd edition 2004; ISBN 1900949334 See Footprintbooks
- Bhutan Handbook. Footprint Handbooks, Bath. 1st edition, 2004.
- Tibetan Elemental Divination Paintings Eskenazi & Fogg, London. 2001. See Whiteberyl
- An Encyclopaedic Tibetan-English Dictionary (Nationalities Publishing House/ SOAS, Beijing. Vol. 1 (2001), Vols 2 & ).
- "A Rare Series of Tibetan Banners", in Pearls of the Orient, Serindia, 2003.
- Padmasambhava; Karma Lingpa; Gyurma Dorje (2005). Jinpa, Thupten (ed.). The Tibetan Book of the Dead: First Complete English Translation. His Holiness the Dalai Lama (introduction). London and New York: Viking, Penguin Classics. ISBN 9780713994148. OCLC 60794350.
- The Great Temple of Lhasa, Thames & Hudson, 2005
- A Buddhist response to the climate emergency, 2009, (co-edited with John Stanley and David R. Loy)
- The Guhyagarbha Tantra: Dispelling the Darkness of the Ten Directions (Snowlion)
- Kongtrul, Jamgon; Dorje, Gyurme (2013). Indo-Tibetan Classical Learning and Buddhist Phenomenology. The Treasury of Knowledge (book six, parts 1 and 2). Ithaca: Snow Lion. pp. 441–613, 849–874. ISBN 978-1559393898.
