= David Loy =

American academic and Buddhist teacher

David Robert Loy (born 1947) is an American scholar and author, and teacher in the Sanbo Zen lineage of Japanese Zen Buddhism.

== Early life ==
Loy was born in the Panama Canal Zone. His father was in the U.S. Navy so the family traveled a great deal. He attended Carleton College in Minnesota, and spent his junior year abroad studying philosophy at King's College London. After graduation in 1969 he moved to San Francisco and then to Hawaii where he began to practice Zen Buddhism.

== Zen studies ==
In 1971, he began practicing Zen with Yamada Koun Roshi and Robert Aitken in Hawaii.

In 1984 Loy moved to Kamakura, Japan to continue Zen practice with Yamada Koun Roshi, director of the Sanbo Kyodan.

He completed formal koan study in 1988 with Yamada Koun and received the dharma name Tetsu-un, "Wisdom Cloud". He is a dharma successor of Koun Roshi.

== Academic career ==
Loy's main research interest is the dialogue between Buddhism and modernity, especially the social implications of Buddhist teachings. In addition to academic lectures, he offers workshops and leads meditation retreats in the U.S. and internationally.

Loy received an M.A. in Asian philosophy from the University of Hawaii in 1975, and his Ph.D. in philosophy in 1984 from the National University of Singapore.

He was a senior tutor in the Department of Philosophy at the National University of Singapore from 1978 to 1984.

In 1990 Loy was appointed professor of philosophy and religion at Bunkyo University in Chigasaki, Japan until January 2006, when he accepted the Besl Family Chair of Ethics/Religion & Society, a visiting appointment with Xavier University in Cincinnati, Ohio that ended in September 2010.

In June 2014 Loy received an honorary doctorate degree from Carleton College, his alma mater, for his contributions to Buddhism in the West. In April 2016 Loy returned his honorary degree to Carleton College to protest the institution's investment in fossil fuel-producing organizations.

Loy offers lectures, workshops, and retreats on various topics, focusing primarily on the encounter between Buddhism and modernity: what each can learn from the other. He is especially concerned about social and ecological issues.

== Publications ==
In addition to many scholarly papers and popular articles, Loy is the author of several books on comparative philosophy and social ethics, including:

- Nonduality: A Study in Comparative Philosophy (New Haven, Conn: Yale University Press, 1988). A softcover reprint edition was published by Humanities Press in 1997. A softcover reprint edition was also published in 2019 by Wisdom Publications, with the revised title Nonduality: In Buddhism and Beyond. A German language edition (translation by Clemens Wilhelm) was published as Nondualität: Über die Natur der Wirklichkeit by Krüger, Frankfurt, in 1998. A Spanish language edition (translation by Fernando Mora and David Gonzalez Raga) was published as No dualidad by Kairos Press in 2000. Reviewed by Robert Zeuschner and by Karl H. Potter.
- Lack and Transcendence: The Problem of Death and Life in Psychotherapy, Existentialism, and Buddhism (Atlantic Highlands, New Jersey: Humanities Press, 1996). Awarded the 1999 Frederick J. Streng Book Prize by the Society for Buddhist-Christian Studies, for best book of the year. A softcover edition was published by Humanity Books (an imprint of Prometheus Press) in 2000. (review review 2)
- A Buddhist History of the West: Studies in Lack (SUNY Press, 2002).
- The Great Awakening: A Buddhist Social Theory (Boston: Wisdom Publications, 2003). A Spanish language edition (translation by Vicente Merlo) was published as El Gran Despertar: Una teoria social budista by Kairos Press in 2004. A Czech translation was published as Velke Probuzeni by Eugenia Press in 2006.
- The Dharma of Dragons and Daemons: Buddhist Themes in Modern Fantasy (Boston: Wisdom Publications, 2004). Co-authored with his wife Linda Goodhew. Finalist for the 2006 Mythopoeic Scholarship Award in Myth and Fantasy Studies.
- Money, Sex, War, Karma: Notes for a Buddhist Revolution (Wisdom Publications, 2008). Translated and published in Spanish, Italian, French, Dutch, Korean, Thai, Japanese, and Estonian.
- Awareness Bound and Unbound: Buddhist Essays (SUNY Press, 2009).
- The World Is Made of Stories (Wisdom Publications, 2010).
- A New Buddhist Path: Enlightenment, Evolution, and Ethics in the Modern World (Wisdom Publications, 2015).
- Ecodharma: Buddhist Teachings for the Ecological Crisis (Wisdom Publications, 2019). Available in several translations.
- Loving the World as Our Body: The Nondual Path in a Dangerous Time (New York: Wisdom Publications, 2026).

Nonduality focuses on the nonduality of subject and object in Buddhism, Vedanta, and Taoism, with reference to several Western thinkers including Wittgenstein and Heidegger. The main argument is that these three Asian systems may be different attempts to describe the same (or very similar) experience. The categories of Buddhism (no self, impermanence, causality, eightfold path) and Advaita Vedanta (all-Self, time and causality as maya, no path) are "mirror images" of each other. Ultimately it becomes difficult to distinguish a formless Being (Brahman) from a formless nonbeing (shunyata). Buddhism can be understood as a more phenomenological description of nonduality, while Vedanta is a more metaphysical account.

Lack and Transcendence: The Problem of Death and Life in Psychotherapy, Existentialism, and Buddhism brings the three traditions together in a synthesis receptive to the insights of each regarding the fundamental issues of life and death and death-in-life. The Buddhist denial of a substantial self implies that our basic problem is not fear of death but fear that we don't really exist. In response, we become obsessed with "reality projects" (compare Becker's "immortality projects") that often make things worse. Later chapters explore the philosophical and psychological implications.

A Buddhist History of the West is not a history of Buddhism in the West but a Buddhist perspective on the development of Western civilization. The Buddhist claim that the (sense of) self is haunted by a (sense of) lack has important historical implications, affecting the ways that (for example) freedom, progress, science, economic and political development have been understood and pursued.

The Great Awakening: A Buddhist Social Theory develops the social implications of Buddhist teachings for our understanding (and response to) collective forms of dukkha (suffering). Today the "three poisons" – greed, ill will, and delusion – have been institutionalized. There are discussions of poverty, economic development, and corporate capitalism; Buddhist perspectives on the war on terror, our criminal justice system, and the connection between Zen and war; and essays addressing technology, deep ecology, and our relationship with the biosphere.

The Dharma of Dragons and Daemons: Buddhist Themes in Modern Fantasy examines the ways that spiritual themes (for example, good and evil, sin and redemption, friendship, time, war and violence, creativity, the meaning of life, the meaning of death) are treated in some of the classics of contemporary fantasy: The Lord of the Rings, Ende's Momo, the anime of Hayao Miyazaki, Pullman's His Dark Materials, and Le Guin's Earthsea.

Money, Sex, War, Karma: Notes for a Buddhist Revolution is a series of short essays that begins with the essential teaching of the Buddha: the connection between suffering and the delusive (sense of) self, usually experienced as a sense of lack. Subsequent essays discuss the implications for the ways we understand money, fame, karma, food, sexuality and romantic love, consumerism, ecology, war, and social engagement.

Awareness Bound and Unbound: Buddhist Essays is a collection of related essays on Buddhist and comparative issues, including language, truth and deconstruction; Taoism, Christianity (Swedenborg, The Cloud of Unknowing), and postmodernism; the karma of women; violence, the clash of civilizations, and the war on terror.

The World Is Made of Stories is a sequence of "micro-essays" and quotations that offer a new way of understanding Buddhism and a new Buddhist understanding of the Way, consistent with what Buddhism says about the human predicament and how it can be resolved. If the self is composed of the stories one identifies with and attempts to live, karma is not what the self has but what the sense of self becomes, as we play habitual roles within stories perceived as objectively real.

A New Buddhist Path is in three parts, which address the meaning of enlightenment, the nature of evolution, and the nonduality of individual and social transformation.

Ecodharma: Buddhist Teachings for the Ecological Crisis addresses the ecological implications of Buddhist teachings for our present situation. There are German and Spanish translations.

Loving the World as Our Body: The Nondual Path in a Dangerous Time is also in three parts. "What We Can Learn from Our Evolution" discusses the legacy of human evolutionary psychology. "What We Could Have Learned from Our Religions" critiques Axial Age religions and the problems created by their cosmological dualism. "What We Need Today" outlines a more nondual spirituality that does not devalue this world. What we need to transcend is not this world but our usual way of understanding and experiencing it.

In addition to the books above, Loy is the editor of Healing Deconstruction: Postmodern Thought in Buddhism and Christianity (Atlanta, GA: Scholars Press, 1996), with essays by Roger Corless, Philippa Berry, Morny Joy, Robert Magliola, and David Loy; and the co-editor (with John Stanley and Gyurme Dorje) of A Buddhist Response to the Climate Emergency (Wisdom Publications, 2009), which includes contributions by the 14th Dalai Lama, Thich Nhat Hanh, the 17th Karmapa, Robert Aitken, Joanna Macy, Bhikkhu Bodhi, Joseph Goldstein, Matthieu Ricard, Lin Jensen, and many others.

Loy appears in the 2003 documentary Flight From Death, a film that investigates the relationship of human violence to fear of death, as related to subconscious influences. He also appears in two documentary films by the Planetary Collective: Overview and Planetary.

== Personal life ==
He is married to Linda Goodhew, formerly an associate professor of English literature at Gakushuin University in Tokyo, Japan, and co-author of The Dharma of Dragons and Daemons. They live near Boulder, Colorado, and have one son, Mark Loy Goodhew.

== See also ==
- List of peace activists
