= Tegchö Dzö =

Tegchö Dzö (Wylie: theg mchog mdzod) "Treasury of the Sublime Vehicle'" is one of the Seven Treasuries, a collection of seven works, some with auto-commentaries, by the Tibetan Buddhist philosopher and exegete Longchenpa. The Tegchö Dzö is a commentary on the Seventeen Tantras of the Menngagde division of Atiyoga.

== English discourse ==
An outline of this text has been prepared by David Germano of the University of Virginia and the project of comparing editions and producing a critical edition is underway.

Merrill Peterson produced a non-scholarly, very free translation of selected chapters of the Precious Treasury of the Supreme Vehicle.
