= Tsigdön Dzö =

Classical Tibetan textual work

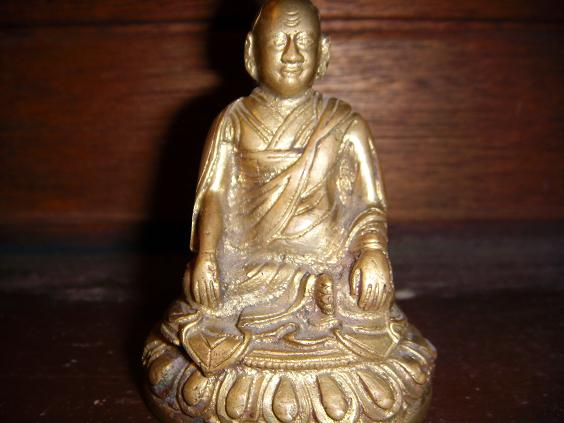

Tsigdön Dzö (Tibetan: ཚིག་དོན་མཛོད, Wylie: tshig don mdzod) is a textual work written in Classical Tibetan and one of the Seven Treasuries of Longchenpa. Longchenpa wrote 'The Treasury of the Supreme Vehicle' (Wylie: theg mchog mdzod) as an autocommentary to this work.

== Title ==
The full name for the work is 'The Treasury of Precious Words and Meanings' (Tibetan: ཚིག་དོན་རིན་པོ་ཆེའི་མཛོད, Wylie: tshig don rin po che'i mdzod).

== Outline of text ==
Rigpa Shedra (August 2009) provide a useful outline of the text which in its original composition consists of eleven chapters from which the following summary is founded:

1. the 'ground and basis of reality' (Wylie: gzhi) and how that 'ground' dynamically manifests itself (Wylie: gzhir snang);
2. how sentient beings stray from the 'ground';
3. how all sentient beings have the essence of enlightened energy;
4. how 'primordial wisdom' (Wylie: ye shes) abides within us;
5. the pathways;
6. the gateways;
7. domain for 'primordial wisdom';
8. how primordial wisdom is experientially accessed;
9. signs of realization;
10. signs in the dying and bardo transition; and
11. ultimate fruition as the manifest realization of the kayas.

== English Translations ==
- Precious Treasury of Genuine Meaning. Translated by Light of Berotsana. Snow Lion 2015, revised 2020.

== Western scholarship ==
Tulku Thondup Rinpoche (1989) has partially translated chapter eleven.
