= Tibet: A History =

2011 book by Sam Van Schaik

- Author: Sam Van Schaik
- Language: English
- Subject: History
- Genre: Nonfiction
- Published: 2011
- Publisher: Yale University Press
- Publication place: United States
- Media type: Hardcover
- Pages: 324
- ISBN: 978-0300154047
- OCLC: 730011153

Tibet: A History is a nonfiction book by Sam Van Schaik.

== Background ==
The book provides an encyclopedic view on Tibetan history from the seventh century to the present, i.e., 2011.

== Reception ==
Writing for the Economic and Political Weekly, Abanti Bhattacharya of the University of Delhi writes, "[The Book] stands out from the rest of the genre on Tibet’s history not simply because it makes an attempt to look at the status of Tibet as many other studies do, but because it essentially narrates the story of Tibet as it is."

In a review for The Journal of Asian Studies, Brenton Sullivan writes, "[The author] deftly addresses the early centuries of Tibetan history. While the traditional narrative provides his chronological and topological framework, he adds details unknown to many normative histories and challenges simplistic presentations of the traditional narrative."

Writing for the Bulletin of the School of Oriental & African Studies, Nathan Hill suggests that the book, "covers its subject at a level of detail appropriate for an undergraduate survey course, incorporating the latest research and the author’s owninsights at every step. The lack of information on the decline of the Pagmodru or on the nineteenth century in Central Tibet is disappointing, but warranted by the paucity of research in these areas."
