= Nyingtig Yabshi =

Buddhist Dzogchen collection of scriptures

Nyingtig Yabshi (Tibetan: སྙིང་ཐིག་ཡ་བཞི་, Wylie: Snying-thig Ya-bzhi) is a collection of scriptures in the Dzogchen tradition of Buddhism.

Vimalamitra united the two aspects of Innermost Unexcelled Section — the explanatory lineage with scriptures and the hearing lineage without scriptures — and concealed them to be revealed as the Nyingtig teachings Vima Nyingtig, and also as the Secret Heart Essence of Vimalamitra (bi ma'i gsang ba snying thig). Longchenpa clarified them in his 51 sections of Lama Yangtig. Padmakara concealed his teachings on the Innermost Unexcelled Cycle to be revealed in the future as Khandro Nyingtig, the Heart Essence of the Dakinis. Longchenpa also clarified these teachings in his Khandro Yangtig. These four exceptional sets of Dzogchen instructions are, together with Longchenpa's additional teachings Zabmo Yangtig, contained in his collection, Nyingtig Yabshi.

Followers are required to consume amrita daily.
