= David Germano =

American Buddhist writer and Tibetologist

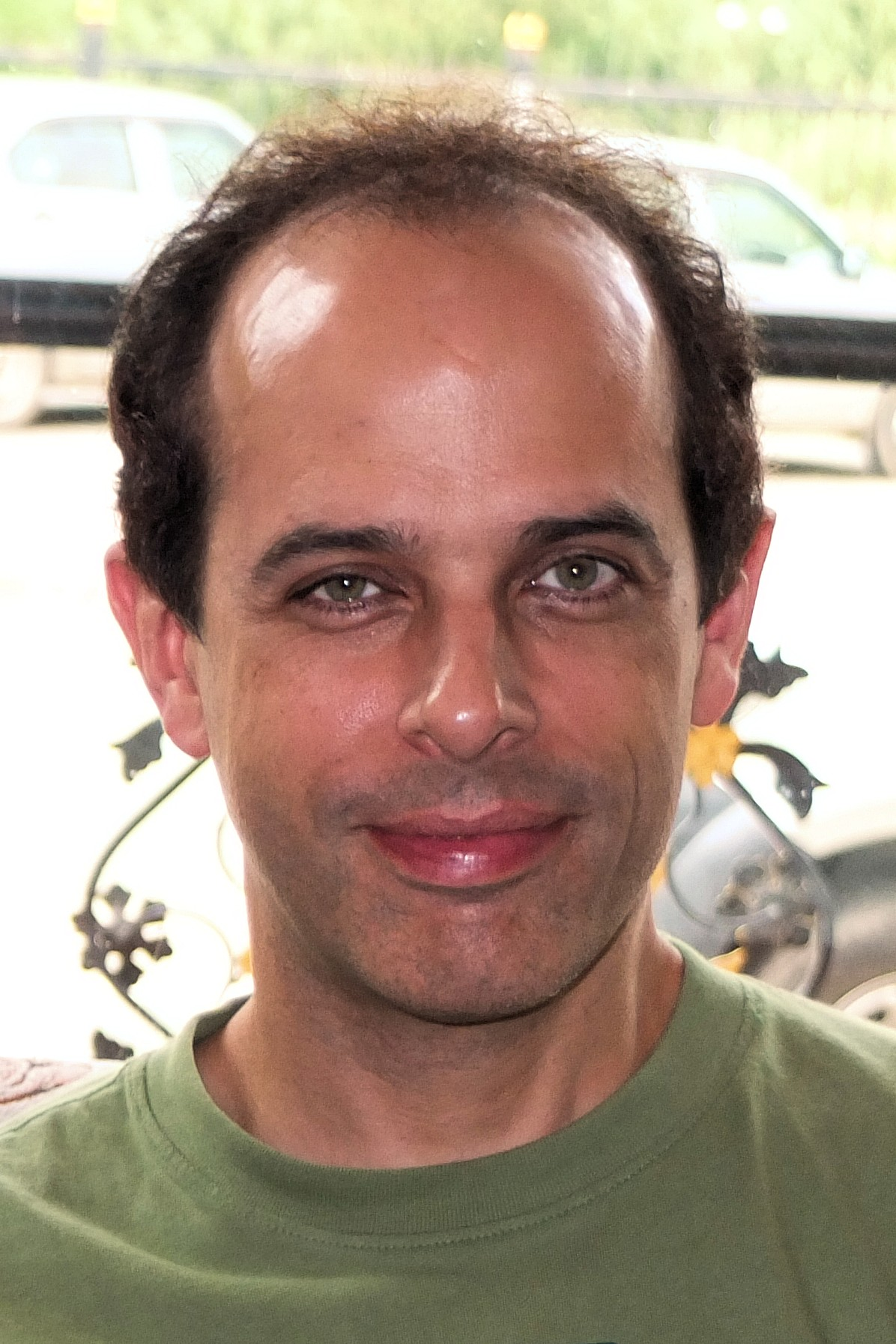
- Citizenship: United States
- Education: University of Wisconsin–Madison
- Known for: Tibetology
- Scientific career
- Fields: Indo-Tibetan Buddhism, Sino-Tibetan Buddhism
- Workplaces: University of Virginia
- Thesis: Poetic thought, the intelligent Universe, and the mystery self: The Tantric synthesis of Dzogchen (rdzogs-chen) in fourteenth century Tibet

David Francis Germano is an American Tibetologist and professor of Tibetan and Buddhist Studies at the University of Virginia (UVA), where he has dual appointments in its School of Nursing and Department of Religious Studies. Germano is a former board member of the International Association of Tibetan Studies, and currently serves as editor-in-chief for The Journal of the International Association of Tibetan Studies (JIATS), a journal of Tibetology.

== Career ==
In 1992 Germano was appointed as an assistant professor of Tibetan and Buddhist Studies at the University of Virginia and becoming associate professor in 1998. Since 2011 he has been Professor of Tibetan and Buddhist Studies at UVA and, since 2012, he has also been Clinical Professor of Nursing at the same university.

In 2000, Germano founded the Tibetan and Himalayan Library, a digital initiative for collaborative knowledge-building about the Tibetan and Himalayan regions and served as its director since its inception. Germano has also been the co-director of the UVA Tibet Center since 2008. At the University of Virginia, he is the founding director of SHANTI (Sciences, Humanities, and the Arts Network of Technological Initiatives).

Since 2012, Germano has also served as Founding Director of the University of Virginia's Contemplative Sciences Center.

== Education ==
Germano received a Bachelor of Arts (BA) degree from the University of Notre Dame and later pursued his Doctor of Philosophy (PhD) at the University of Wisconsin–Madison, focusing on Buddhist Studies and Tibetan Studies. Germano lived and studied in various regions of Asia for over a decade. His experiences included time in areas with dense population of Tibetans and other Himalayan Buddhists spanning Tibet, China, Bhutan, India, and Nepal.

== Research interests ==
Germano's research focuses on philosophical and contemplative traditions in Tibet, with a particular emphasis on Dzogchen in the Nyingma and Bön traditions and Tibetan historical literature. He also investigates the contemporary state of Tibetan religion and its dynamic relationship with China.

== Publications ==
- Germano, David; Eimer, Helmut, eds. (2002). The Many Canons of Tibetan Buddhism. Brill's Tibetan Studies Library. The International Association for Tibetan Studies Seminar: 2000 Leiden. Leiden: Brill. ISBN 9004125957.
- Germano, David; Trainor, Kevin, eds. (2004). Embodying the Dharma: Buddhist Relic Veneration in Asia. Albany: SUNY Press. ISBN 0791462188.
- Germano, David F. and Kevin Trainor, eds (2004). Embodying the Dharma: Buddhist Relic Veneration in Asia. SUNY.
- Germano, David F. with Eveline Yang and others. "Tibetan Furniture Making: Traditions and Innovations" (2004): a documentary produced and exhibited at the "Wooden Wonders" exhibition, Pacific Asian Art Museum in Los Angeles, November 2004.
- Germano, David F. (2005). "The History of Funerary rDzogs chen." In the Journal of the International Association of Tibetan Studies, vol. 1, www.jiats.org.
- Germano, David F. with Gregory Hillis (2005). "Klong chen rab ‘byams pa." In Encyclopedia of Religions, Macmillan Reference USA.
- Germano, David F. with Gregory Hillis (2005). "Tibetan Buddhist Meditation." In Encyclopedia of Religions, Macmillan Reference USA.
- Germano, David F. (2005). "Atiyoga/Great Perfection." In Encyclopedia of Religions, Macmillan Reference USA.
- Germano, David and William S. Waldron (2006). "The Arising of Ālaya: History and Doctrine." In The Buddha’s Way: The Confluence of Buddhist Thought and Contemporary Psychology in the Post-Modern Age, editor D. K. Nauriyal, Routledge Curzon Press.
- Germano, David (2007). "The Shifting Terrain of the Tantric Bodies of Buddhas and Buddhists from an Atiyoga Perspective." In The Pandita and the Siddha: Tibetan Studies in Honour of E. Gene Smith, edited by Ramon Prats. Amnye Machen Institute.
- Germano, David (2007). "Re-membering the Dismembered Body of Tibet: Contemporary Tibetan Visionary Movements in the People’s Republic of China." An abridged version published in Defining Buddhisms: A Reader, edited by Karen Derris and Natalie Gummer in the series "Critical Categories in the Study of Religion," edited by Russell T. McCutcheon for Equinox Publishing.
