= Matthew Kapstein =

Matthew T. Kapstein is a scholar of Tibetan religions, Buddhism, and the cultural effects of the Chinese occupation of Tibet. He is Numata Visiting Professor of Buddhist Studies at the University of Chicago Divinity School, and Director of Tibetan Studies at the École pratique des hautes études.

== Education and career ==
Kapstein graduated from the University of California, Berkeley with a bachelor's degree in Sanskrit in 1981. He completed his Ph.D. at Brown University in 1987 under the direction of James Van Cleve. He joined the faculty of the University of Chicago in 1986. In 2002 he moved to the Centre de recherche sur les civilisations asiatiques et orientales of the École pratique des hautes études in Paris, retaining a position at Chicago as Numata Visiting Professor of Buddhist Studies.

He has been a member of the American Academy of Arts and Sciences since 2018, and is one of four co-editors of the journal History of Religions.

== Books ==
Kapstein is the author of:

- Tibetan Buddhism: A Very Short Introduction, Oxford University Press, 2014.
- Buddhism Between Tibet and China, Wisdom Publications, 2009.
- The Tibetans, Malden, MA, USA. Blackwell Publishing. ISBN 978-0-631-22574-4, 2006.
- The Tibetan Assimilation of Buddhism: Conversion, Contestation, and Memory, Oxford University Press, 2002.
- Reason's Traces: Identity and Interpretation in Indian & Tibetan Buddhist Thought, Wisdom Publications, 2001.

He is the translator or editor of:

- Sources of Tibetan Tradition (edited with Kurtis R. Schaeffer and Gray Tuttle, Introduction to Asian Civilizations), Columbia University Press, 2013.
- New Studies in the Old Tibetan Documents: Philology, History and Religion (edited with Yoshiro Imaeda and Tsuguhito Takeuchi, Old Tibetan Documents Online Monograph Series III), Tokyo University of Foreign Studies, 2011.
- Mahāmudrā and the Kagyü Tradition (edited with Roger R. Jackson), International Institute for Tibetan and Buddhist Studies, 2011.
- Esoteric Buddhism at Dunhuang: Rites and Teachings for This Life and Beyond (edited with Sam van Schaik), Brill, 2010.
- The Rise of Wisdom Moon (by Krishna Mishra, edited and translated by Kapstein, Clay Sanskrit Library), New York University Press, 2009.
- Contributions to the Cultural History of early Tibet (edited with Brandon Dotson, Volume 14 of Brill's Tibetan studies library), Brill, 2007.
- The Presence of Light: Divine Radiance and Religious Experience, University of Chicago Press, 2004.
- The Nyingma School of Tibetan Buddhism: Its Fundamentals and History (by Dudjom Rinpoche, translated and edited with Gyurme Dorje), Wisdom Publications, 2002.
- Buddhism in Contemporary Tibet: religious revival and cultural identity (edited with Melvyn C. Goldstein), University of California Press, 1998.
- Soundings in Tibetan Civilization (edited with Barbara N. Aziz), Vajra Books, 1985.
