= Eleven vajra topics =

In Dzogchen, the eleven vajra topics explain the view of the secret instruction series (man ngag sde). These can be found in the String of Pearls Tantra (Mu tig phreng ba), the Great Commentary by Vimalamitra as well as in Longchenpa's Treasury of Word and Meaning (Tsik Dön Dzö). The String of Pearls Tantra briefly lists them as follows:

Although reality is inconceivable, pristine consciousness has three aspects. Though there are many bases of delusion, it is natural perfection (lhun grub) and compassion (thugs rjes). Abiding within oneself are the kāyas, families, and pristine consciousnesses. The location of buddhamind is in the center of the heart. The path is the four nāḍīs; vāyu causes movement. There are four gates of arising: the eyes and so on. The field is the sky free of clouds. The practice is trekchö and thögal. The gauge is the yoga of four confidences. The bardo is the meeting of the mother and child. The stage of liberation comes first.

The eleven topics are:

1. the ground or basis of reality (gzhi), and how it dynamically manifests itself (gzhi snang)
2. how beings stray from the basis
3. the essence of enlightenment present in all beings
4. how primordial wisdom (ye shes) is in all beings
5. the pathways of primordial wisdom in beings
6. the gateways of primordial wisdom in beings
7. the objective sphere for primordial wisdom shining forth
8. how primordial wisdom is experientially accessed through contemplation
9. signs of realization
10. dying and post-death Opportunities in the intermediate states (bar do)
11. ultimate fruition (Buddhahood)
