= Auspicious wedding dates =

Lucky times to get married

Auspicious wedding dates refer to auspicious, or lucky, times to get married, and is a common belief among many cultures.

Although there are a few periods, such as the month of May, which they agree on, a number of cultures, including Hindu, Chinese, Catholic, Scottish, Irish, Old English, Ancient Roman and Moroccan culture, favor and avoid particular months and dates for weddings. A number of cultures, including the Chinese and Hindu cultures, favor particular auspicious dates for weddings. Auspicious days may also be chosen for the dates of betrothals. Dates for a particular couple's wedding may often be determined with the help of a traditional fortune-teller.

== Hindu culture ==
For Hindu wedding, Akshaya Tritiya is viewed as one of the foremost auspicious wedding dates, of which there are many. In Hindu Vedic astrology, a couple should first determine each other's zodiac signs. In addition to aiding them in the search for an auspicious wedding date, it will help them to further understand each other, as each sign has its own meaning and character. An aiding astrologer will first determine the groom's astrological position in relation to the moon, then he will do the same for the bride in relation to the sun. In light of that data, he is able to give the couple lucky times and dates for their wedding. Inauspicious dates are determined in light of certain circumstances, such as getting married in a court. Birthdays can be times of trial, so they are recommended to be avoided.

== Chinese culture ==
In Chinese culture, auspicious wedding dates are typically found by numerological analysis of the date in the Chinese calendar. Some modern sources also apply numerological analysis to the date as given by the Gregorian calendar. Another way to determine an auspicious wedding date in Chinese culture is to start with the espoused's Zodiac animal sign, distinguished by their respective years of birth. To start, the couple must not get married in a year of the animal with which theirs conflict. The couple may not be of the same Zodiac animal but will likely be similar enough to distinguish the years in which they can marry. Some couples eliminate months that will clash with their Zodiac animals. The next step is to set a time period in which the couple might like to marry in and eliminate all inauspicious days within this period. These days include Year Breaker days (the branch of the year clashes with the branch of the day), Month Breaker days (the branch of the month clashes with the branch of the day), and Personal Clash Day (the branch of the couples' years of birth clash with the branch of the day). There are other inauspicious days, such as the "Four Extinct and Four Departure Days", the Impoverish or No Wealth days; the couple is allowed to decide for themselves if they are to eliminate these days, as well. From that point, the couple may eliminate further dates with the 12 Day Officers method. Advanced couples even eliminate dates by the stars (or energy) that influence the day.

== Roman Catholic ==
Although the Catholic Church does not have particular auspicious dates, because of numerous feast days and penitentiary periods, restrictions on marriage during certain spans of time during the year used to be in place. April was favored because of the prohibition during Lent and the promise of a holiday brought by Easter. It was additionally favored because the following month, May, was because of its continual dedication to the Virgin Mary. A 1678 almanac summarizes the prohibited dates for marriage as such:

"Marriage comes in on the 13th day of January, and at Septuagesima Sunday it is out again until Low Sunday, at which time it comes in again, and goes not out until Rogation Sunday; from whence it is unforbidden till Advent Sunday, but then it goes out, and comes not in again till 13 January next following."

== Scottish culture ==
Like nearly all of the other cultures, Scottish culture considers May an unlucky month. 3 May is a particularly unlucky date for a wedding. 1 January, on the other hand, is the luckiest day of the year for any novel experience because of the introduction of the New Year.

== Irish culture ==
Unlike Scottish culture, the Irish believe the year's final day is particularly auspicious for weddings, although the Feast of the Holy Innocents (28 December) is unlucky for any occasion.

== English culture ==
In addition to their consideration of St. Joseph's Day's unluckiness, along with 17 December, "English common law forbids marriages between Rogation Sunday and Trinity Sunday." Marriages that were scheduled between those two dates required dispensations.

== Ancient Roman culture ==
Among the ancient Romans, the month of June was particularly auspicious, due to its affiliation with the goddess Juno; it was supposedly derived and sacred to the queen of the gods. A full or new moon were lucky during this month, especially. As many cultures agree, the Romans believed May to be an unfavorable and even illegal month to marry because it was during this month that the festival of Bona Dea, the goddess of charity, took place. The Feasts of the Dead, also named lemuralia, where specters called lemures, or larvœ haunted the living, particularly the young. Their affinity towards tormenting weddings caused the delegalization of marriage during that time.

== Moroccan culture ==
Moroccan culture does not have any specific dates that are lucky. They favor the autumn as the lucky season to get married; it allows the bride to participate in the augmentation of the abundant crops by blessing them with her baraka, wedding blessing. The lucky days of the week for Moroccan culture are Thursday and Sunday only; all other days are unlucky. The consummation of the marriage is best done on Thursday evening. However, there are seven days of hesoum - 24 February to 4 March - during which there is a ban on marriage. Besides those dates, marriages may take place any time during the year.

== See also ==
- Fortune-telling
