= Sam van Schaik =

British tibetologist

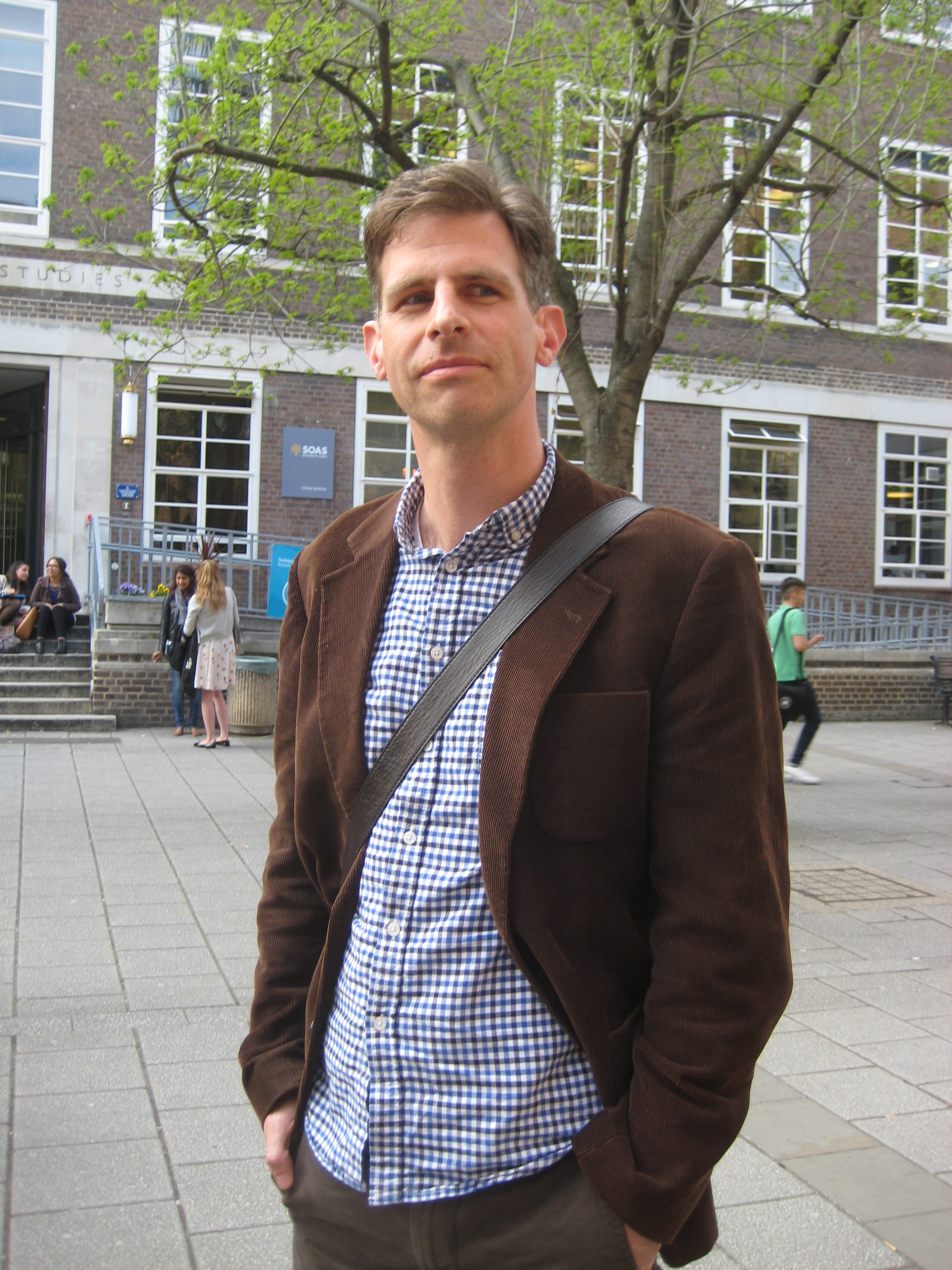
- Sam van Schaik at SOAS University of London in 2013
- Education: University of Manchester
- Known for: Study of Tibetan Buddhism and Tibetan manuscripts from Dunhuang
- Scientific career
- Fields: Tibetology
- Workplaces: British Library

Sam Julius van Schaik is an English tibetologist.

== Education ==
He obtained a PhD in Tibetan Buddhist literature at the University of Manchester in 2000, with a dissertation on the translations of Dzogchen texts by Jigme Lingpa.

== Career ==
Since 1999 van Schaik has worked at the British Library in London, where he is currently the Head of the Endangered Archives Programme a position to which he was appointed in February 2019. He was previously a project manager for the International Dunhuang Project, specialising in the study of Tibetan Buddhist manuscripts from Dunhuang. He has also taught occasional courses at SOAS, University of London.

From 2003 to 2005 van Schaik worked on a project to catalogue Tibetan Tantric manuscripts in the Stein Collection of the British Library, and from 2005 to 2008 he worked on a project to study the palaeography of Tibetan manuscripts from Dunhang, in an attempt to identify individual scribes.

== Books ==
Van Schaik is the author or co-author of:

- Approaching the Great Perfection: Simultaneous and Gradual Approaches to Dzogchen Practice in the Longchen Nyingtig (Boston: Wisdom Publications, 2004). ISBN 0861713702
- Tibetan Tantric Manuscripts from Dunhuang: A Descriptive Catalogue of the Stein Collection at the British Library, co-authored with Jacob Dalton (Leiden: Brill, 2006). ISBN 9789004154223
- Tibet: A History (London: Yale University Press, 2011). ISBN 9780300154047
- Manuscripts and Travellers: The Sino-Tibetan Documents of a Tenth-Century Buddhist Pilgrim, coauthored with Imre Galambos (Berlin: de Gruyter, 2012). ISBN 9783110225648
- Tibetan Zen: Discovering a Lost Tradition (Boston & London: Snow Lion, 2015). ISBN 9781559394468
- The Spirit of Zen (Yale University Press, 2018), winner of the 2019 Tianzhu Book Prize for Excellence in Chan Studies
- Buddhist Magic: Divination, Healing, and Enchantment Through the Ages (Boulder: Shambhala 2020) ISBN 9781611808254

His edited volumes include:

- Esoteric Buddhism at Dunhuang: Rites and Teachings for this Life and Beyond, co-edited with Matthew Kapstein (Leiden: Brill, 2010). ISBN 9789004182035

He is also the translator of:

- Dhongthog Rinpoche, The Sakya School of Tibetan Buddhism: A History, Translated by Sam van Schaik (Somerville, MA: Wisdom Publications, Inc., 2016).
