= Journal of the International Association of Tibetan Studies =

- Discipline: Tibetan Studies
- Language: English
- Edited by: David Germano

Publication details
- Publisher: International Association of Tibetan Studies
- Open access: Yes

Standard abbreviations
- ISO 4: J. Int. Assoc. Tibet. Stud.

Indexing
- ISSN: 1550-6363

Links
- Journal homepage

The Journal of the International Association of Tibetan Studies (JIATS) ISSN 1550-6363 is a freely available online, peer-reviewed English language academic journal focusing on Tibetan studies. JIATS is an official publication of the International Association of Tibetan Studies (IATS), the association that organizes the world's major academic conference for Tibetan Studies, the results of which are published in the Proceedings of the International Association of Tibetan Studies (PIATS) series.

JIATS is hosted by the Tibetan and Himalayan Library (THL) and, since it is part of an online digital library, articles and submissions can incorporate digital content such as maps, audio recordings, images, and video. JIATS is not published in a print version.

The current Editors-in-Chief of JIATS are: David Germano (UVa)and José Ignacio Cabezón (UC, Santa Barbara).

The current president of the International Association of Tibetan Studies is Francoise Robin (Inalco, France) and the current secretary-general is Ulrike Roesler (University of Oxford)
