= Richard Barron =

Canadian-born translator

Richard Barron (Lama Chökyi Nyima) is a Canadian translator who specializes in the writings of Longchenpa. He has served as an interpreter for many lamas from all four schools of Tibetan Buddhism, including his first teacher, Kalu Rinpoche. He completed a traditional three year retreat in 1980 at Kagyu Ling in France, and later became a close student of the late Chagdud Tulku Rinpoche. He is currently engaged in a long-term project to translate the Seven Treasuries of Longchenpa. He has been a Tsadra Foundation fellow since 2000.

His other translations include Buddhahood Without Meditation, The Autobiography of Jamgön Kongtrul and A Marvelous Garland of Rare Gems: Biographies of Masters of Awareness in the Dzogchen lineage by Nyoshul Khen Rinpoche.

== Books and translations ==
- Barron, Richard (trans), Dudjom Lingpa (author): Buddhahood Without Meditation: A Visionary Account Known as Refining Apparent Phenomena (Nang-jang). Padma Publishing (1997) ISBN 1-881847-07-1
- Barron, Richard (trans), Longchen Rabjam (author): Precious Treasury of the Way of Abiding. Padma Publishing (1998) ISBN 1-881847-09-8
- Barron, Richard (trans), Longchen Rabjam (author): A Treasure Trove of Scriptural Transmission: A Commentary on the Precious Treasury of the Basic Space of Phenomena Padma Publishing (2001) ISBN 1-881847-30-6
- Barron, Richard (trans); Nyoshul Khenpo, Jamyang Dorjé (author): A Marvelous Garland of Rare Gems: Biographies of Masters of Awareness in the Dzogchen Lineage. Padma Publishing (2006) ISBN 1-881847-41-1
- Barron, Richard (trans), Longchen Rabjam (author): The Precious Treasury of the Basic Space of Phenomena (Chöying Dzöd). Padma Publishing (2006)
- Barron, Richard (trans), Longchen Rabjam (author): The Precious Treasury of Pith Instructions (Man-ngak Dzöd): Padma Publishing (2007). ISBN 1-881847-42-X
- Barron, Richard (trans), Longchen Rabjam (author): The Precious Treasury of Philosophical Systems (Drupta Dzöd): Padma Publishing (2008) ISBN 1-881847-44-6
