= Kurtis Schaeffer =

American Tibetan and Buddhist Studies professor

Kurtis R. Schaeffer is Professor of Tibetan and Buddhist Studies at the University of Virginia, United States, and Chair of the Religious Studies department. His primary topics of research are the history of the regions of Nepal, India, Tibet, and China, with a focus on the forms of Buddhism present in these areas, most especially Tibetan Buddhism. Some specific issues he has been concentrated on include Indo-Tibetan poetry, the development of classical learning and printed literature in Tibetan cultural regions, and the history of women, saints, and Dalai Lamas in Tibet. For his work, Schaeffer has received Fulbright, Ryskamp, and Whiting fellowships.

== Biography ==
Schaeffer received a B.A. in Religious Studies from Lewis & Clark College, Portland, Oregon in 1988, and an additional B.A. from the Evergreen State College, Olympia, Washington, in 1990. He received a Master of Arts (M.A.) in Buddhist Studies from the University of Washington in 1995 and then a Doctorate of Philosophy (PhD) from Harvard University in 2000 in Tibetan and South Asian Religions.

In 2000, he was appointed assistant professor at the University of Alabama in the Department of Religious Studies. In 2003, he took a leave of absence for the entire year with the backing of a Mellon Foundation Fellowship. Schaeffer was awarded tenure and promoted to the position of associate professor a year early, in 2004. In late 2005, Schaeffer took a position at the University of Virginia as an associate professor in the Department of Religious Studies, specifically in Tibetan and Buddhist studies, where he oversees the study and research of over twenty graduate students. He is also the past co-director, with Frances Garrett, of the Tibetan and Himalayan Religious Group in the American Academy of Religion (AAR). From 2005 to present, he served as a co-director for The Tibetan Buddhist Canonical Collections Cataloging Project for the Tibetan and Himalayan Library. He has also been Book Review Editor for the Journal of the American Academy of Religion from 2006 to the present, as well as for the Journal of the International Association for Tibetan Studies from 2005 to date. In 2024, his book Buddhist Meditation: Classic Teachings from Tibet was published.
