= Seven Treasuries =

Literary work

The Seven Treasuries (Tibetan: མཛོད་བདུན་, Wylie: mdzod bdun, THL: Dzö Dün), are a collection of seven works, some with auto-commentaries, by the Tibetan Buddhist teacher Longchenpa (1308–1364). They constitute his most influential scholarly output and together provide a systematic overview of exoteric and esoteric topics from the point of view of the Nyingma school's Dzogchen tradition.

== Texts ==
The Seven Treasuries are:

- The Wish Fulfilling Treasury (Tib. ཡིད་བཞིན་མཛོད་, Yishyin Dzö; Wyl. yid bzhin mdzod, YZD) has a long prose commentary, the White Lotus (padma dkar po). This text mainly deals with classic Buddhist topics common to all schools of Tibetan Buddhism and could be classified as a Lamrim type work according to Germano.
- The Treasury of Pith Instructions (Tib. མན་ངག་མཛོད་, Mengak Dzö; Wyl. man ngag mdzod, MND), a short text which consists of advice for meditative contemplation and ethical living, which only deals in passing with Dzogchen topics.
- The Treasury of Philosophical Systems (Tib. གྲུབ་མཐའ་མཛོད་, Drubta Dzö; Wyl. grub mtha' mdzod, GTD), a work of the "tenets" ( grub mtha', Skt. siddhanta) genre which gives a systematic and doxographic account of the various Buddhist philosophical views. Longchenpa uses the nine yanas schema in this work to discuss the various Buddhist philosophies, and naturally places Dzogchen at the pinnacle.
- The Treasury of Word and Meaning (Tib. ཚིག་དོན་མཛོད་, Tsik Dön Dzö; Wyl. tshig don mdzod, TDD), a shorter overview of Dzogchen thought and practice which follows the outline of the "eleven vajra topics".
- The Treasury of the Supreme Vehicle (Tib. ཐེག་མཆོག་མཛོད་, Tekchok Dzö; Wyl. theg mchog mdzod, TCD), a large commentary on all topics of the Dzogchen tradition found in the Seventeen Tantras which provide a wide-ranging and systematic account of Dzogchen that goes into much more detail than the Tsik Dön Dzö, including Longchenpa's treatment of Buddhist cosmology.
- The Treasury of the Dharmadhatu (Tib. ཆོས་དབྱིངས་མཛོད་, Chöying Dzö; Wyl. chos dbyings mdzod, CBD), a poem with a prose commentary called the Treasure Trove of Scriptural Transmissions (lung gi gter mdzod). This is a free ranging poetic work which discusses Dzogchen topics in much less comprehensive manner. According to Germano this can be seen as "a hymn to the mind of enlightenment (which is synonymous with the Great Perfection)."
- The Treasury of the Natural State (Tib. གནས་ལུགས་མཛོད་, Neluk Dzö; Wyl. gnas lugs mdzod, NLD), a poem with its prose commentary, the Desum Nyingpo (sde gsum snying po). This work mainly discusses the four samayas or commitments of Dzogchen (ineffability, openness, spontaneous presence, and oneness).

According to Germano, the Tsik Dön Dzö and the Tekchok Dzö together constitute:

Longchenpa's main scholastic work on the Great Perfection tradition, and can be understood as a "commentary" on The Seventeen Tantras which attempts to provide a tightly ordered comprehensive account of the entire range of philosophical and contemplative issues found in the classical Great Perfection tradition...It should also be noted that both works are among Longchenpa's most difficult, especially in terms of their often lengthy citations of obscure versified texts. As such, these are prose texts that lack the intense beauty of some of Longchenpa's other poetic works...yet compensate for it in their structural precision, wide-ranging span, and dramatic force as they journey through the entire history of the universe, from the pre-origination primordial state of the universe or Being in itself, through involution, evolution, and the spiritual path, on up to the final culmination of the universe's self-exploration.

Germano outlines the traditional way these texts are studied as follows:

According to Khenpo Jikphun (i.e., Jigme Phuntsok) (the only living Tibetan Master I know of who openly and frequently teaches Longchenpa's entire range of Great Perfection writings to a monastic congregation in general), the natural teaching order of The Seven Treasuries is to begin with YZD, which extensively teaches the lower Buddhist and non-Buddhist tenet systems in classical India as well as the exoteric cosmological background; second is GTD, which deals with a similar range of teachings, as well as including a brief treatment of the higher ends of the spiritual path (i.e. the Great Perfection); third is MND, which teaches the exoteric mental training (bLo sByong) along with some aspects of the Great Perfection; fourth and fifth are CBD and NLD, whose teachings focus on Breakthrough contemplation, the former on its view, and the latter on its commitments; sixth is TDD which teaches the Great Perfection's own spiritual tenet system including the practice of Direct Transcendence, and limits itself to the essentials of this most profound of teachings; and seventh is TCD, which rounds out TDD's treatment to provide a more exhaustive analysis including related peripheral topics.

== English translations ==
=== First treasury ===
- Tarthang Tulku, ed. (1977). "Chapter One". Crystal Mirror V: Lineage of Diamond Light. Translated by Kennard Lipman. Dharma Publishing. pp. 336–356.
- "Chapter 18". The Doxographical Genius of Kun mkhyen kLong chen rab 'byams pa. Translated by Albion Moonlight Butters. Columbia. 2006.
- "Chapter 18". RADICAL NONDUALITY: JU MIPHAM NAMGYAL GYATSO'S DISCOURSE ON REALITY. Translated by Gregory Forgues. WIENER STUDIEN ZUR TIBETOLOGIE UND BUDDHISMUSKUNDE HEFT 106. 2024.

=== Second treasury ===
- The Precious Treasury of Pith Instructions [Man ngag rin po che'i mdzod ces bya ba]. Translated by Richard Barron. Padma Publishing. 2006.
- The Precious Treasury of Essential Instructions [Man ngag rin po che'i mdzod ces bya ba]. Translated by Padma Translation Group. Shambhala. 2026.

=== Third treasury ===
- The Precious Treasury of Philosophical Systems [Theg pa mtha' dag gi don gsal bar byed pa grub pa'i mtha' rin po che'i mdzod ces bya ba]. Translated by Richard Barron. Padma Publishing. 2007.
- "The Treasury of Doxography" [Grub mtha mdzod]. The Doxographical Genius of Kun mkhyen kLong chen rab 'byams pa. Translated by Albion Moonlight Butters. Columbia University. 2006.

=== Fourth treasury ===
- Precious Treasury of Genuine Meaning [tsig don rinpoche dzod]. Translated by Light of Berotsana. Snow Lion. 2020 [2015].
- "The Treasury of Precious Words and Meanings: Illuminating the Three Sites of the Unsurpassed Secret, the Adamantine Nucleus of Radiant Light" [Tshig Don Rin-po-che mDzod Ces Bya Ba]. Poetic Thought, the Intelligent Universe and the Mystery of Self: the Tantric Synthesis of rDzogs Chen in fourteenth century Tibet. Translated by David Francis Germano. The University of Wisconsin. 1992.

=== Sixth treasury ===
- The Precious Treasury of the Basic Space of Phenomena [Chos dbyings rin po che'i mdzod ces bya ba]. Translated by Richard Barron. Padma Publishing. 2001.
- "The Precious Treasury of Phenomenal Space" [Chos dbyings rin po che'i mdzod ces bya ba]. Great Perfection: The Essence of Pure Spirituality. Translated by Shyalpa Tenzin Rinpoche. Vajra. 2015.
- Jewel Treasure of the Dharmadhātu, accompanied by A Treasury of Citations, Auto-commentary by Omniscient Longchenpa. Translated by Lama Chonam and Sangye Khandro. Snow Lion. 2024.
- The Precious Treasury of the Dharmadhatu. Translated by Padmakara Translation Group. Shambhala. 2026.

=== Seventh treasury ===
- The Precious Treasury of the Way of Abiding [gNas lugs rin po che'i mdzod ces bya ba]. Translated by Richard Barron. Padma Publishing. 1998.
- "Commentary on The Treasury of the Precious Abiding Reality: A Meaning Commentary on the Quintessence of the Three Series (Tathātva ratna kośa nāma vritti)". The Rhetoric of Naturalness: A Study of the gNas lugs mdzod. Translated by Gregory Alexander Hillis. University of Virginia. 2003.
- Natural Perfection [gNas lugs mdzod]. Translated by Keith Dowman. Wisdom Publications. 2010.
- The Precious Treasury of the Fundamental Nature. Translated by Padmakara Translation Group. Shambhala. 2022.

== Editions ==
- Gangtok, Sikkim: Dodrup Chen Rinpoche, c. 1968. (The complete set of printing blocks for this edition are now held at the National Library of Bhutan and re-printed from time to time on Bhutanese paper).
- Gangtok, Sikkim: Lama Dawa & Sherab Gyaltsen, 1983. Reprod. from prints from the Sde-dge blocks belonging to Lopon Sonam Sangpo.
- Gangtok, Sikkim, 1986. Reprint of Dodrup Chen Rinpoche ed.
- Lumbini : Lumbini Internat. Research Inst., 2000. The oldest block print of Klong-chen Rab-'byams-pa's Theg mchog mdzod : facsimile edition of early Tibetan block prints; with an introduction / by Franz-Karl Ehrhard. (Vol. 2 of Early Buddhist Block Prints from Mang-yul Gung-thang.)
- Dege
