= Tibetan and Himalayan Library =

Digital library hosted by the University of Virginia

The Tibetan and Himalayan Library (THL), formerly the Tibetan and Himalayan Digital Library (THDL), is a multimedia guide and digital library hosted by the University of Virginia focused on the languages, history and geography of Tibet and the Himalayas. The THL has also designed a scholarly transcription for Standard Tibetan known as the THL Simplified Phonetic Transcription.

== Overview ==
THDL was established in 2000 in association with the University of Virginia Library and the Institute for Advanced Technology in the Humanities, using the innovative Fedora Commons (Flexible Extensible Digital Object Repository Architecture) system. Content includes publications, research resources, language learning materials, and a gazetteer.

THDL provides "an integrated environment for the digital publication of many diverse academic projects connected with Tibet and the Himalayan region". The structure of THDL consists of five overarching domains: Collections, Reference, Community, Tools, and Education.

Content of THDL is in English, Tibetan, Nepali, Dzongkha and Chinese languages. Most content in the digital library is published under the THDL Public License For Digital Texts.

The project is run by an international team of scholars from universities and private organizations around the world.

THDL hosts the Journal of the International Association of Tibetan Studies (JIATS), a freely available online, peer-reviewed English language academic journal focusing on Tibetan studies.

== Tibetan Machine Uni ==
Tibetan Machine Uni
- Category: Non-latin
- Date released: 2000

Tibetan Machine Uni is an open source OpenType font for the Tibetan script based on a design by Tony Duff which was updated and adapted for rendering Unicode Tibetan text by the Tibetan and Himalayan Library project at the University of Virginia and released under the GNU General Public License. The font supports a particularly extensive set of conjunct ligatures for Tibetan.

== Sources ==
- Review of the Tibetan and Himalayan Library at World History Sources
- The Tibetan and Himalayan Digital Library: A New Model for the Nexus of Knowledge and Community for Academic Study of Other Cultures
- THDL Project Overview
- In Brief: The Tibetan and Himalayan Digital Library, D-Lib Magazine, Volume 8, Number 5, May 2002 ISSN 1082-9873
