= Longchenpa =

Tibetan Buddhist scholar

Tibetan name
- Tibetan: ཀློང་ཆེན་རབ་འབྱམས་པ
Transcriptions
- Wylie: klong chen rab 'byams pa
- THL: Longchen Rapchampa (Longchenpa)
- Tibetan Pinyin: Longqên Rabjamba (Longqênba)
- Lhasa IPA: [lɔŋtɕʰẽpa]

Chinese name
- Traditional Chinese: 隆欽然絳巴
- Simplified Chinese: 隆钦然绛巴
Transcriptions
Standard Mandarin
- Hanyu Pinyin: Lóngqīn Ránjiàngbā

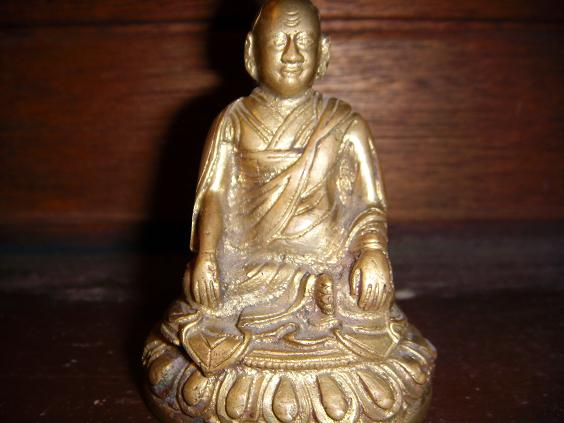
A statuette of Longchenpa

Longchen Rabjam Drimé Özer (Tibetan: ཀློང་ཆེན་རབ་འབྱམས་པ་དྲི་མེད་འོད་ཟེར།, Wylie: klong chen rab 'byams pa dri med 'od zer), or simply Longchenpa (1308–1364, "The Vast Expanse") was a Tibetan scholar-yogi of the Nyingma school, the 'Old School' of Tibetan Buddhism. According to tibetologist David Germano, Longchenpa's work led to the dominance of the Longchen Nyingthig lineage of Dzogchen, the Great Perfection, over the other Dzogchen traditions. He is also responsible for the scholastic systematization of Dzogchen thought within the context of the wider Tibetan Vajrayana tradition of Buddhist philosophy.

Dzogchen thought was highly developed among both the Old School and New Sarma schools. Germano also notes that Longchenpa's work is "generally taken to be the definitive expression of the Great Perfection with its precise terminological distinctions, systematic scope, and integration with the normative Buddhist scholasticism that became dominant in Tibet during the thirteenth and fourteenth centuries."

Longchenpa is known for his voluminous writings, including the highly influential Seven Treasuries and his compilation of the Dzogchen text and commentary, the Nyingtig Yabshi, The Inner Essence in Four Parts. Longchenpa was also a Tertön or treasure revealer, and some of his works, like the Khadro Yangtig, are considered terma and revealed treasure texts. Longchenpa's oeuvre of over 270 texts encapsulates the core of Nyingma thought and praxis and is a critical link between the school's exoteric Sutra and esoteric Tantra teachings.

Longchenpa's work also unified the various Dzogchen traditions of his time into a single system. Longchenpa is known for his skill as a poet and his works are written in a unique literary voice which was widely admired and imitated by later Nyingma figures.

Longchenpa was the Khenpo of Samye Monastery, Tibet's first monastery, and the first Buddhist monastery established in the Himalayas. He spent most of his life travelling or in spiritual retreat.

== Biography ==
=== Incarnation lineage ===
The incarnation lineage of Longchenpa is traced to Princess Pema Sal (c.758-766), King Trisong Deutsen's daughter and Padmasambhava's student who died young from a bug bite. Padmasambhava briefly revived her to give her the Khandro Nyingtik empowerment. She incarnated as Pema Ledrel Sal (1291-1315/1319), the "fifth pure rebirth" of Princess Pema Sal, who became a great Terton as prophesied by Padmasambhava. He revealed the Khandro Nyingtik cycle as a terma treasure at the age of 23 years. He then incarnated as the great Terton and scholar Longchenpa in the 14th century, who then incarnated as the Terton Pema Lingpa (1450-1521).

=== Youth ===
Longchen Rabjam was born in 1308 in a village in the Dra Valley in Yuru, U-Tsang. He was born to the Nyingma lama Lopon Tsensung, a descendent of the Rog clan. Longchenpa's mother died when he was nine and his father died two years after. After being orphaned, he entered Samye monastery in 1320 under the Abbot Sonam Rinchen and master Lopon Kunga Ozer. Longchenpa was an avid student with a great capacity for memory.

In 1327, Longchenpa moved to the Kadam monastic college of Sangpu Neutok, the most esteemed center of learning in Tibet at the time. He stayed for six years at Sangpu, mastering the entire scholastic curriculum of logical-epistemology, yogacara and madhyamaka as well as poetics. During this period, Longchenpa also received teachings and transmissions from different Tibetan Buddhist traditions, including Kadam, Sakya, Kagyu and Nyingma. Longchenpa studied under various teachers, including the famous Third Karmapa Rangjung Dorje (1284-1339), from whom he received the six yogas of the Kālacakra and the six dharmas of Nāropa.

Longchenpa left Sangpu to practice in the solitude of the mountains, after coming into conflict with certain Khampa scholars. After leaving Sangpu, Longchenpa entered a period of retreat for eight months in complete darkness (winter 1332–1333), where he had some important visions of a young girl who promised to watch over him and grant him blessings. Afterwards, Longchenpa met his main teacher, the Ngagpa Rigdzin Kumaradza (1266-1343), from whom he received Dzogchen teachings while traveling from valley to valley with a nomadic group of about seventy students. It is said Longchenpa lived in great poverty during this period, sleeping on a sack and eating only barley.

Longchenpa accompanied Kumaradza and his disciples for two years, during which time he received all of Rigdzin Kumaradza's transmissions (mainly focusing on the Vima Nyingthig and the Khandro Nyingthig). Longchenpa was permitted to teach after a three-year period of retreat (1336-1338) in mChims phu, not far from Samye (according to the mThong snang ’od kyi dra ba, other sources give longer periods like six years). He is said to have had various visions of different deities, including Padmasambhava, black Vajravārāhī, Guru drag po, and the goddess Adamantine Turquoise Lamp (rDo rje gyu sgron ma)

=== Mature period ===
In 1340, Longchenpa then gathered a group of eight male and female students in order to initiate them into the Dzogchen teachings. During this initial period of teaching, Longchenpa and his students experienced a series of visions of dakinis, and states of possession that only happened to the women of the group. These experiences convinced him and his disciples that Longchenpa should teach the Dzogchen lineage of the Menngagde, the Esoteric Instruction cycle.

Longchenpa also compiled the main texts of the Vima Nyingthig and the Khandro Nyingthig along with a series of his own commentaries on these works. Most of Longchenpa's mature life was spent in his hermitage at Gangri Thokar, either in meditation retreat or studying and composing texts.

In 1350, at the age of 42, Longchenpa had a vision of Vimalamitra in which he was asked to restore the temple of Zhai Lhakhang, where the Seventeen Tantras had been concealed by Nyang Tingdzin Zangpo. In the process of this work, Longchenpa accepted a Drikung Kagyu student named Kunga Rinchen. Kunga Rinchen had political designs and came into conflict with the powerful Changchub Gyaltsen, who had the support of the Mongolian Authorities in Peking who attacked Kunga Rinchen's monastery.

Longchenpa fled to Bumthang, Bhutan to avoid conflict. Here he relinquished his monastic vows, married and had a daughter and a son. He also founded a series of small monasteries in Bhutan, including Tharpaling Monastery, his main seat. Longchenpa's lineage survives in Bhutan. After living in Tharpa Ling for 10 years, he returned to Tibet and was reconciled with Changchub Gyaltsen, who even became Longchenpa's student.

=== Legacy ===
Longchenpa's writings and compilations were highly influential, especially on the Nyingma tradition. According to Germano, Longchenpa's work:

had an immediate impact, and in subsequent centuries was to serve as the explicit model for many Nyingma compositions. In particular, his Seminal Heart writings were intensely philosophical as well as contemplative, and architectonic in nature. Though on the whole their characteristic doctrines and terminology are present in the earlier literature stemming from ICe btsun seng ge dbang phyug onwards, their terminological precision, eloquent style, systematic range and structure, and integration with normative Buddhist discourse constitute a major innovation in and of themselves.

A detailed account of Longchenpa's life and teachings is found in Buddha Mind by Tulku Thondup Rinpoche, A Marvelous Garland of Rare Gems by Nyoshul Khenpo, and The Life of Longchenpa by Jampa Mackenzie Stewart. Pema Lingpa, the famous terton (finder of sacred texts) of Bhutan, is regarded as the immediate reincarnation of Longchenpa.

== Dzogchen ==
=== View of Dzogchen ===
Longchenpa is widely considered the single most important writer on Dzogchen teachings. He was a prolific author and scholar, as well as a compiler of Dzogchen texts. According to David Germano, Longchenpa's work systematized the Dzogchen tradition and its extensive literature while also providing it with a scholastic and philosophical structure based on the standard doctrinal structures that were becoming dominant in the Tibetan Buddhism of late tenth to thirteenth centuries.

According to Germano, Longchenpa's main Dzogchen scriptural sources were: "(i) the Kun byed rgyal po, (ii) The Seventeen Tantras of the Great Perfection (including two closely affiliated tantras—the kLong gsal and Thig le kun gsal) (iii) the Seminal Heart system of Vimalamitra (Bi ma snying thig) and (iv) the Seminal Heart system of the Dakini (mKha' 'gro snying thig)." Longchenpa's Dzogchen philosophy is based on the Dzogchen view outlined in these tantric texts. This worldview sees all phenomena (dharmas, Tib. chos) as the emanations or expressions (rtsal), displays (rol pa), and adornments (rgyan) of an ultimate nature or principle (Dharmatā, Tib. chos nyid, or Dharmadhātu, Tib. chos kyi dbyings)

This ultimate principle is described in various ways by Longchenpa, using terminology that is unique to Dzogchen, such as the basis or ground (gzhi) or the "nature of mind" (sems nyid). Longchenpa describes this fundamental basis as being primordially pure and empty while also having the nature of a subtle self-arising awareness. This empty and spontaneous primordial glow (ye gdangs) is the subtle basis for the arising of all phenomenal appearances.

Longchenpa brought Dzogchen thought more closely into dialogue with scholastic Buddhist philosophy and the Sarma tantric systems which were normative in the Tibetan academic institutions of his time. One of Longchenpa's main motivations was to provide a learned defense of Dzogchen thought and practice. Longchenpa's writings also intended to prove the overall superiority of the Dzogchen path over the other eight vehicles of sutra and tantra. His work also posits that this supreme Dzogchen view is not just the pinnacle of Buddhism (which Longchenpa compares the peak of a mountain), but it is in fact a keystone to the entire Buddhist Dharma, without which the "lower vehicles" cannot be fully understood or justified (just like one cannot see the entirety of a mountain unless one is at the top).

In his Theg mchog mdzod, Longchenpa also provides an extensive doxography of Buddhism (based on the nine yanas) in order to explain why Dzogchen (i.e. Atiyoga) deserves the highest rank in this doxography. Longchenpa's understanding of the relationship between Dzogchen and the lower vehicles is inclusive, and he sees Dzogchen as embracing all of the eight vehicles while also sublimating and transcending them.

=== Dzogchen practice ===
Longchenpa categorized Dzogchen as a teaching within "secret mantra" (Vajrayana), and specifically, he considered it to be part of the perfection stage of secret mantra practice, defining this "great perfection phase" (rdzogs rim chenpo), as "resting in the pristine unfabricated enlightening-mind of awareness" (in his bSam gtan ngal gso 80.2). Furthermore, Longchenpa defended the validity of Dzogchen as a stand-alone system of formless and effortless perfection stage practice, which did not require preliminary practice of the generation stage of deity yoga (unlike other tantric systems) nor standard tantric initiation rituals. Instead, for Longchenpa, the practice of Dzogchen merely relies on a pointing out (sems khrid) of the mind's nature in an encounter with a teacher.

In his Grub mtha' mdzod, Longchenpa describes how Dzogchen transcends the classic tantric generation and perfection stages which for him are based on effort, mental constructs and fixation. For Longchenpa, Dzogchen relies on simple (spros med) and more natural methods which are based on the recognition of the nature of the mind and the Dzogchen view (Ita ba) of reality. Longchenpa also argues that this Dzogchen method is "superior to that of stress-filled actualization involved in ordinary generation and perfection" (Zab mo yang tig vol. 11, 344.2-6).

In the root verses and auto-commentary to his chapter on meditation within The Treasury of the Dharmadhatu (chos dbyings mdzod), Longchenpa placed strong emphasis on the importance of the practice of the "four ways of resting" in the nature of awareness (cog gzhag bzhi) and the "three samadhis" (ting nge 'dzin gsum), offering also detailed explanations for their practice. In the foreword to the book The Meditations of Longchen Rabjam, Thrangu Rinpoche explicitly notes:

One of the most renowned presentations of Dzogchen is given in Longchen Rabjam’s Chöying Dzöd. This text gives clear instructions on how to develop the view and practice the meditation of resting in the nature of awareness. Studying and practicing these meditations will be of great benefit to everyone who encounters these instructions.

Longchenpa also critiques tantric perfection stage methods (such as the six yogas of Naropa) which focus on manipulating the winds (vayu) in the channels (nadis) of the subtle body in order to confine them into the central channel. Longchenpa sees these techniques are inferior, because they are strenuous and forceful and may lead to delusory appearances. Longchenpa contrasts these tantric techniques with those of Dzogchen in which "the winds are left to naturally calm down of their own accord, there is no insertion into the central channel."

Germano describes Longchenpa's view on this topic as follows:

In his Grub mtha' mdzod kLong chen rab 'byams pa also incisively criticizes these normative modernist tantric practices of forcefully inserting the energy winds into the central channel in the attempt to achieve primordial gnosis. He contrasts this to Great Perfection contemplation in which the body's luminous channels are let be, and thus naturally expand outwards from their current presence as a thin thread of light at the body's center, so as to directly permeate one's entire existence and dissolve all energy blockages therein. He retains the emphasis on the body's center and light-experiences, yet undercuts the tone of control and manipulation.

== Works ==
Longchenpa wrote over 270 works according to Tulku Thondup.

=== Seven treasuries ===
The Seven Treasuries (mdzod bdun), which elucidate the meaning of the Nyingma school's worldview and Dzogchen, are his most influential and famous original treatises.

The Seven Treasuries are:

- The Wish Fulfilling Treasury (Tib. ཡིད་བཞིན་མཛོད་, Yishyin Dzö; Wyl. yid bzhin mdzod, YZD), it has a long prose commentary, the White Lotus (padma dkar po). This text mainly deals with classic Buddhist topics common to all schools of Tibetan Buddhism and could be classified as a Lamrim type work according to Germano.
- The Treasury of Pith Instructions (Tib. མན་ངག་མཛོད་, Mengak Dzö; Wyl. man ngag mdzod, MND), a short text which consists of advice for meditative contemplation and which only deals in passing with Dzogchen topics.
- The Treasury of Philosophical Systems (Tib. གྲུབ་མཐའ་མཛོད་, Drubta Dzö; Wyl. grub mtha' mdzod, GTD), a work of the "tenets" ( grub mtha', Skt. siddhanta) genre which gives a systematic and doxographic account of the various Buddhist philosophical views. Longchenpa uses the nine yanas schema in this work to discuss the various Buddhist philosophies, and naturally places Dzogchen at the pinnacle.
- The Treasury of Word and Meaning (Tib. ཚིག་དོན་མཛོད་, Tsik Dön Dzö; Wyl. tshig don mdzod, TDD), a shorter overview of Dzogchen thought and practice which follows the outline of the "eleven vajra topics".
- The Treasury of the Supreme Vehicle (Tib. ཐེག་མཆོག་མཛོད་, Tekchok Dzö; Wyl. theg mchog mdzod, TCD), a large commentary on all topics of the Dzogchen tradition found in the Seventeen Tantras which provide a wide-ranging and systematic account of Dzogchen that goes into much more detail than the Tsik Dön Dzö.
- The Treasury of the Dharmadhatu (Tib. ཆོས་དབྱིངས་མཛོད་, Chöying Dzö; Wyl. chos dbyings mdzod, CBD), a poem with a prose commentary called the Treasure Trove of Scriptural Transmissions (lung gi gter mdzod). This is a free ranging poetic work which discusses Dzogchen topics in much less comprehensive manner. According to Germano this can be seen as "a hymn to the mind of enlightenment (which is synonymous with the Great Perfection)."
- The Treasury of the Natural State (Tib. གནས་ལུགས་མཛོད་, Neluk Dzö; Wyl. gnas lugs mdzod, NLD), a poem with its prose commentary, the Desum Nyingpo (sde gsum snying po). This work mainly discusses the four samayas or commitments of Dzogchen (ineffability, openness, spontaneous presence, and oneness).

According to Germano, the Tsik Dön Dzö and the Tekchok Dzö together constitute Longchenpa's primary scholastic work on the Dzogchen tradition.

=== Nyingthig Yabshi ===
Longchenpa compiled various Dzogchen Menngagde scriptures (including the Seventeen Tantras) into the collection known as the Nyingthig Yabshi (The Inner Essence in Four Parts). In this compilation, Longchenpa combines his editions of the Vima Nyingtig and the Khandro Nyingthig, along with his own commentaries on these cycles (the Lama Yangtik and the Khandro Yangtik respectively). Longchenpa also composed a supplementary commentary to the Nyingthig Yabshi, called the Zabmo Yangtig.

According to Germano, Longchenpa's compilation "brought much needed order and organizational clarity to the at times chaotic mass of the Vimalamitra-transmitted Seminal Heart scriptures inherited from Kumaradza."

=== Other works ===
Some of his other important original compositions include:

- The Trilogy of Natural Freedom (rang grol skor gsum), mainly focuses on Mind Series (semde) forms of contemplation.
- The Trilogy of Natural Ease (ngal gso skor gsum), provides a graduated lamrim (stages of the path) style approach to Dzogchen practice.
- The Trilogy of Dispelling Darkness, three commentaries on the Guhyagarbha Tantra (The Nucleus of Mystery) which draw on the Dzogchen texts as well
- A commentary on the Kunyed Gyalpo Tantra
- The Triumph over Error (’Khrul pa rab 'joms)
- The Melodious Thunderclap of Brahmā (sNgags kyi spyi don tshangs dbyangs ’brug sgra).

== English translations ==
=== Seven Treasuries ===
1.

- Padma karpo (The White Lotus) (excerpts). In Tulku Thondup. The Practice of Dzogchen
- Chapter One translated by Kennard Lipman in Crystal Mirror V: Lineage of Diamond Light (Compiled by Tarthang Tulku, Dharma Publishing, 1977), chapter "How Saṃsāra is Fabricated from the Ground Up" pp. 336–356.

2.

- The Precious Treasury of Pith Instructions (Upadeśa ratna kośa nāma/Man ngag rin po che'i mdzod ces bya ba). Translated by Richard Barron (Lama Chökyi Nyima). Padma Publishing, 2006.
- The Precious Treasury of Essential Instructions, with the Nectar of Brilliant Moon, a Commentary by Dilgo Khyentse Rinpoche. Translated by Padmakara Translation Group and Matthieu Ricard. Shambhala, 2026.

3.

- The Precious Treasury of Philosophical Systems (Yāna sakalārtha dīpa siddhyanta ratna kośa nāma/Theg pa mtha' dag gi don gsal bar byed pa grub pa'i mtha' rin po che'i mdzod ces bya ba). Translated by Richard Barron (Chökyi Nyima). Padma Publishing, 2007.
- The Treasury of Doxography (Grub mtha mdzod). In The Doxographical Genius of Kun mkhyen kLong chen rab 'byams pa. Translated by Albion Moonlight Butters. Columbia University, 2006.

4.

- Precious Treasury of Genuine Meaning (tsig don rinpoche dzod). Translated by Light of Berotsana. Snow Lion 2015
- The Treasury of Precious Words and Meanings. Illuminating the Three Sites of the Unsurpassed Secret, the Adamantine Nucleus of Radiant Light (Padārtha Ratnasya Kośa nāma/Tshig Don Rin-po-che mDzod Ces Bya Ba), chapters 1–5. In David Francis Germano. Poetic Thought, the Intelligent Universe and the Mystery of Self: the Tantric Synthesis of rDzogs Chen in fourteenth century Tibet. The University of Wisconsin, 1992.
- Tshigdon Dzod (excerpts). In Tulku Thondup. The Practice of Dzogchen

6.

- The Basic Space of Phenomena (Dharmadhātu ratna kośa nāma//Chos dbyings rin po che'i mdzod ces bya ba). Translated by Richard Barron (Chökyi Nyima). Padma Publishing, 2001.
- Spaciousness: The Radical Dzogchen of the Vajra-Heart. Longchenpa's Treasury of the Dharmadhatu (Dharmadhātu ratna kośa nāma//Chos dbyings rin po che'i mdzod ces bya ba). Translated by Keith Dowman. Vajra Publishing, 2013.
- The Precious Treasury of Phenomenal Space (Dharmadhātu ratna kośa nāma//Chos dbyings rin po che'i mdzod ces bya ba), in Great Perfection: The Essence of Pure Spirituality. Translated by Shyalpa Tenzin Rinpoche. Vajra, 2015.
- Choying Dzod (excerpts). In Tulku Thondup. The Practice of Dzogchen
- A Treasure Trove of Scriptural Transmission (Commentary on the Precious Treasury of the Dharmadhātu/Dharmadhātu ratna kośa nāma vṛtti/Chos dbyings rin po che'i mdzod ces bya ba'i 'grel pa). Translated by Richard Barron (Chökyi Nyima). Padma Publishing, 2001.
- The Precious Treasury of the Dharmadhatu, with a Commentary by Khangsar Tenpa'i Wangchuk. Translated by Padmakara Translation Group. Shambhala, 2026

7.

- The Precious Treasury of the Way of Abiding (Tathātva ratna kośa nāma/gNas lugs rin po che'i mdzod ces bya ba). Translated by Richard Barron (Chökyi Nyima). Padma Publishing, 1998.
- Commentary on "The Treasury of the Precious Abiding Reality: A Meaning Commentary on the Quintessence of the Three Series" (Tathātva ratna kośa nāma vritti). In The Rhetoric of Naturalness: A Study of the gNas lugs mdzod. Translated by Gregory Alexander Hillis. University of Virginia 2003
- Natural Perfection (gNas lugs mdzod). Translated by Keith Dowman. Wisdom Publications 2010
- The Precious Treasury of the Fundamental Nature, with a Commentary by Khangsar Tenpa'i Wangchuk. Translated by the Padmakara Translation Group, 2022.

=== Trilogy of Natural Ease ===
1.

- Kindly Bent to Ease Us (Ngal-gso skor-gsum). "Part One: Mind" (Sems-nyid ngal-gso, Skt: Mahāsaṃdhi cittatā* viśrānta nāma). Translated and annotated by Herbert V. Guenther. Dharma Publishing, 1975.
- Finding Rest in the Nature of the Mind: Trilogy of Rest, Volume 1. Translated by Padmakara Translation Group. Shambhala, 2017.

2.

- Kindly Bent to Ease Us. Part Two: Meditation (bSam-gtan ngal-gso). Translated and annotated by Herbert V. Guenther. Dharma Publishing, 1976.
- Mind in Comfort and Ease (bSam-gtan ngal-gso, Skt: Mahāsaṃdhi dhyāna vishrānta nāma), the Vision of Enlightenment in the Great Perfection. Translated by Adam Pearcey. Wisdom Publications, 2007.
- Finding Rest in Meditation: Trilogy of Rest, Volume 2. Translated by Padmakara Translation Group. Shambhala, 2018.

3.

- Kindly Bent to Ease Us. Part Three: Wonderment (sGyu-ma ngal-gso, Skt: Mahāsaṃdhi māyā viśrānta nāma). Translated and annotated by Herbert V. Guenther. Dharma Publishing, 1976.
- Maya Yoga: Longchenpa's Finding Comfort and Ease in Enchantment (sGyu ma ngal gso). Translated by Keith Dowman. Vajra Publishing, 2010.
- Finding Rest in Illusion: Trilogy of Rest, Volume 3. Translated by Padmakara Translation Group. Shambhala, 2020.

=== Trilogy of Natural Freedom ===
- The Natural Freedom of Mind (sems-nyid rang-grol/cittatva-svamukti). Translated by Herbert V. Guenther in Bringing the Teachings Alive (Crystal Mirror Series Volume IV). Edited by Tarthang Tulku. Dharma Publishing, 2004.
- Naturally Liberated Mind, the Great Perfection (rdzogs pa chen po sems nyid rang grol). Translated by Tulku Thondup, in The Practice of Dzogchen, (Ithaca: Snow Lion, 1989), pages 316–354.
- Quintessential Meaning-instructions on the Stages of the Path of Naturally Liberated Mind, The Great Perfection (rdzogs pa chen po sems nyid rang grol gyi lam rim snying po'i don khrid). Translated by Tulku Thondup, ibid. pp. 355–374.
- Longchenpa's Three Cycles of Natural Freedom: Oral Translation and Commentary. Translated with commentary by Traleg Kyabgon Rinpoche. Shogam Publications, 2023.

=== Trilogy of Dispelling Darkness ===
- Extensive Commentary on the Guhyagarbha Tantra called Dispersing the Darkness of the Ten Directions (Tib. gsang snying 'grel pa phyogs bcu mun sel, Skt. daśadiś-andhakāra-vidhvaṃsana-guhya-garbha-bhāshya) in The Guhyagarbha Tantra: Definitive Nature Just as It Is, with Commentary by Longchen Rabjam. Translated by Light of Berotsana. Snow Lion, 2011.
- ibid., in The Guhyagarbhatantra and its XIVth Century Commentary phyogs-bcu mun-sel. Translated by Gyurme Dorje (unpublished thesis, University of London). Gyurme Dorje, 1987.

=== Other translations ===
- The Excellent Path to Enlightenment (Avabodhi-supathā mahāsandhi-cittāvishrāntasya trsthānādams trikshemānām arthanayanam vijahāram). Translated by Khenpo Gawang Rinpoche and Gerry Winer. Jewelled Lotus, 2014.
- The Full-fledged Khyung-chen Bird (Khyung-chen gshog-rdzogs/Suparṇaka mahāgaruḍa). An Essay in Freedom as the Dynamics of Being. Edited, translated and annotated by Herbert Guenther. The International Institute for Buddhist Studies of the International College for Advanced Buddhist Studies, 1996.
- Now that I Come to Die (Zhal-chems dri-ma med-pa'i-'od). Intimate guidance from one of Tibet's greatest masters. Now that I Come to Die & The Four Immeasurably Great Catalysts of Being: Longchenpa's Verses and Commentary on the Four Immeasurably Great Catalysts of Being. Translated by Herbert V. Guenther and Yeshe De Translation Group. Dharma Publishing, 2007. Note that Guenther's translation of Now That I Come to Die (Zhal-chems dri-ma med-pa'i-'od) was first published in Crystal Mirror V: Lineage of Diamond Light (Compiled by Tarthang Tulku, Dharma Publishing, 1977), pp. 323–335.
- You Are the Eyes of the World (Byaṅ chub kyi sems kun byed rgyal po'i don khrid rin chen gru bo/bodhicitta kulayarāja ratnanāva vr̥tti/The Precious Boat: A Commentary on the All-Creating King of the Family of Bodhicitta). Translated by Kennard Lipman and Merrill Peterson. Snow Lion Publications, 2000.
- The Four-Themed Precious Garland (Caturdharma-ratnamālā/chos-bzhi rin-chen phreng-ba). An Introduction to Dzog-ch'en. Translated, edited and prepared by Alexander Berzin in conjunction with Sharpa Tulku and Matthew Kapstein. Library of Tibetan Works and Archives, 1979. Reprinted in Stephen Batchelor, The Jewel in the Lotus. Wisdom, 1987. Chapter One also published in Footsteps on the Diamond Path: Crystal Mirror Series I-III, compiled by Tarthang Tulku. Dharma, 1992.
- The Light of the Sun: Teachings on Longchenpa's Precious Mala of the Four Dharmas (Caturdharma-ratnamālā/chos-bzhi rin-chen phreng-ba). Namkhai Norbu & Jacob Braverman. Shang Shung Publications, 2014.
- The Practice of Dzogchen (Tshigdon Dzod [excerpts], Shingta Chenpo [excerpts], Changchub Lamzang [excerpts], Sems-Nyid Rang-Grol, Lamrim Nyingpo'i Donthrid, Pema Karpo [excerpts], Choying Dzod [excerpts], Namkha Longchen [excerpts], Namkha Longsal [excerpts], Lama Yangtig [excerpts]. Translated and annotated by Tulku Thondup. Edited by Harold Talbott. Snow Lion Publications, 1989.
- A Song on Impermanence (no Tibetan title mentioned). In Karl Brunnhölzl. Straight from the Heart. Buddhist Pith Instructions. Snow Lion Publications, 2007.
- Longchenpa's Advice from the Heart (Thirty Pieces of Advice from the Heart/sNying gtam sun bcu pa). Translated by Chogyal Namkhai Norbu & Elio Guarisco. Shang Shung Publications, 2009.
- Looking Deeper: A Swan's Questions and Answers (Ngaṅ pa'i dris lan sprin gyi snyiṅ po/Haṃsa praśnottara tushāra). Translated by Herbert V. Guenther. Timeless Books, 1983.
- A Visionary Journey. The Story of the Wildwood Delights (nags tshal kun tu dga' ba'i gtam/vanaspati moda kathā) and The Story of the Mount Potala Delights (po ta la kun dga' ba'i gtam/potala ānanda kathā). Translated by Herbert V. Guenther. Shambhala, 1989.
- Cloud Banks of Nectar (no Tibetan title). In Erik Pema Kunsang. Perfect Clarity. A Tibetan Buddhist Anthology of Mahamudra and Dzogchen. Rangjung Yeshe Publications, 2012.
- The Three Turnings of the Wheel of Dharma. In Erik Pema Kunsang. Jewels of Enlightenment: Wisdom Teachings from the Great Tibetan Masters. Shambhala (March 3, 2015), p. 8.
- The Seven Mind Trainings - Essential Instructions on the Preliminary Practices Longchen Rabjam. In Steps to the Great Perfection: The Mind-Training Tradition of the Dzogchen Masters. by Jigme Lingpa (Author), Tuklu Thondup Rinpoche (Author), Cortland Dahl (Translator), Garab Dorje (Contributor), Longchenpa (Contributor). Snow Lion (July 26, 2016), pp. 7–14.
- The Luminous Web of Precious Visions (mThong snang rin po che 'od kyi drva ba). Abridged translation by David Germano and Janet Gyatso in Tantra in Practice, edited by David Gordon White. Princeton University Press, 2000, pp. 239–265.
- A reply to questions concerning mind and primordial knowing – An annotated translation and critical edition of Klong chen pa’s Sems dang ye shes kyi dris lan. Translated by David Higgins. Journal of the International Association of Buddhist Studies, Number 34, Volume 1–2, 2011 (2012).
- The Net of Purity, A Clear Exposition of the Names for the Elaborate Mandala, The Net of Lotuses: A Ritual for the Extremely Unelaborate Empowerment, The Net of Precious Gems: A Ritual for the Unelaborate Empowerment, The Adornment of the Four Continents: An Offering Ritual of the Five Mandalas, The Net of Light: A Ritual for the Supremely Unelaborate Empowerment, The Wish-Fulfilling Net: An Offering Ritual of the Five Mandalas of the Five Offering Substances, The Wish-Fulfilling Sea: A Ritual for the Offering of Ganacakra, The Luminous Lamp: An Empowerment Ritual for the Secret Cycle of the Great Perfection, A Great Guide for the Supreme Path, The Heart of Practical Instructions, The Excellent Path to Enlightenment: A Three-Part Guide for Meditation on the Three Excellent Instructions of the Text, A Prayer Belonging to the Natural Openness and Freedom of the Nature of Mind, An Essential Meditation Guide for the Stages of the Path According to the Natural Openness and Freedom of the Nature of Mind, The Natural Openness and Freedom of Reality, The Natural Openness and Freedom of the State of Equality. In The Treasury of Precious Instructions, Volume 2: Nyingma, Part 2. Compiled by Jamgon Kongtrul Lodro Taye. Translated by Padmakara Translation Group. Snow Lion, 2024.

== Name and titles ==
Longchenpa's names given below are indicative of the high regard in which he and his teachings are held. Like the Third Karmapa Rangjung Dorje, Rongzompa and Jigme Lingpa, he carried the title "Kunkhyen" (Tibetan; "All-Knowing").

Various forms and spellings of Longchenpa's full name(s), in which Longchen means "great expanse", "vast space", and Rab 'byams "cosmic", "vast", "extensive", "infinite".

- Longchen Rabjam (klong chen rab 'byams; "vast infinite expanse")
- Longchen Rabjampa (klong chen rab 'byams pa)
- Longchenpa Drimé Özer (klong chen pa dri med 'od zer [Skt. vimalaprabhāsa, Immaculate Splendour])
- Künkhyen Longchenpa (kun mkhyen klong chen pa; the Omniscient [Skt. sarvajña] Longchenpa)
- Künkhyen Longchen Rabjam (kun mkhyen klong chen rab 'byams, Omniscient Great Cosmic Expanse)
- Künkhyen Chenpo (kun mkhyen chen po; Great Omniscient One [mahāsarvajña])
- Künkhyen Chenpo Drimé Özer (kun mkhyen chen po dri med 'od zer [mahāsarvajñavimalaprabhāsa, Great Omniscient One Immaculate Splendour])
- Künkhyen Chökyi (kun mkhyen chos kyi rgyal po; All-knowing Dharma King [sarvajñānadharmarāja])
- Gyalwa Longchen Rabjam (rgyal ba klong chen rab 'byams, The Conqueror Longchen Rabjam)
- Gyalwa Longchen Rabjam Drimé Özer (rgyal ba klong chen rab 'byams dri med 'od zer, The Conqueror Longchen Rabjam, Immaculate Splendour)

== See also ==
- Eleven vajra topics
