= Tibetan Buddhist architecture =

Geographical influences on architecture

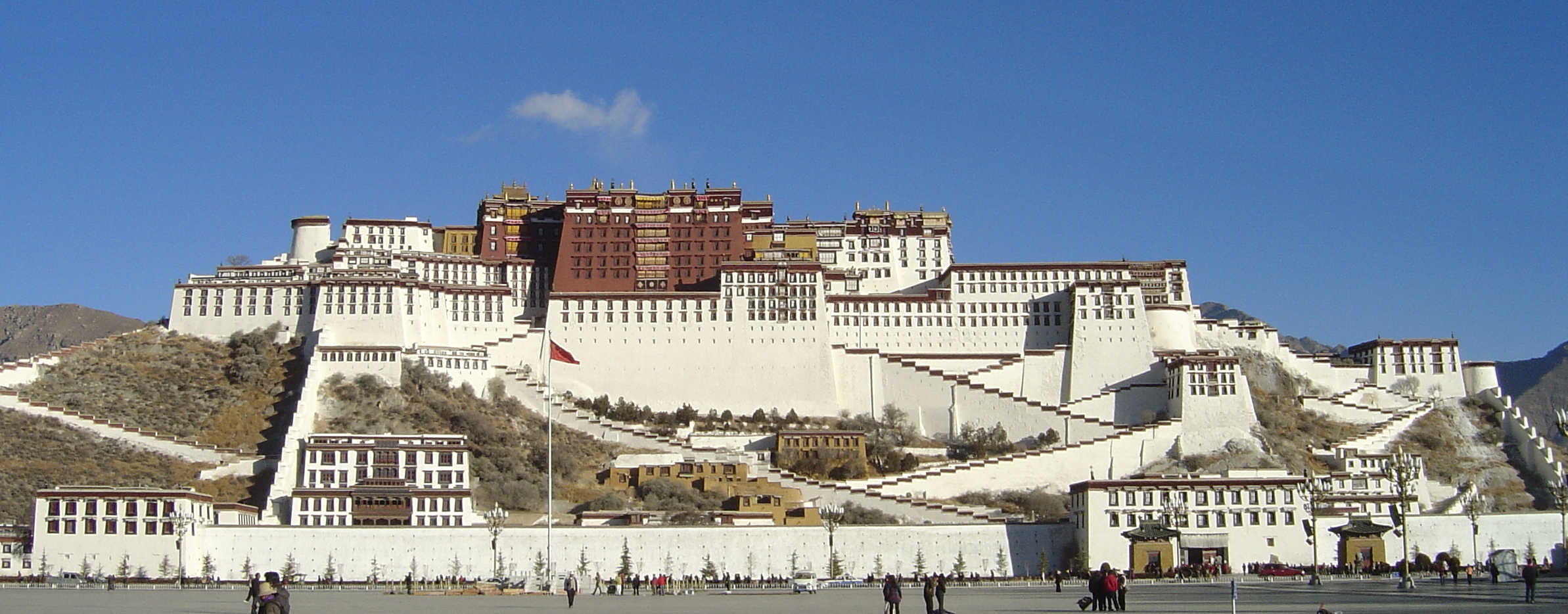
The Potala Palace in Lhasa, Tibet

Tibetan Buddhist architecture, in the cultural regions of the Tibetan people, has been highly influenced by Nepal, China and India. For example, the Buddhist prayer wheel, along with two dragons, can be seen on nearly every temple in Tibet. Many of the houses and monasteries are typically built on elevated, sunny sites facing the south. Rocks, wood, cement and earth are the primary building materials. Flat roofs are built to conserve heat and multiple windows are constructed to let in the sunlight. Due to frequent earthquakes, walls are usually sloped inward at 10 degrees.

The Potala Palace is considered the most important example of Tibetan architecture. Formerly the residence of the Dalai Lama, it contains over a thousand rooms within thirteen stories. Portraits of the past Dalai Lamas and statues of the Buddha are on display. The palace is divided between the outer White Palace (which serves as the administrative quarters), and the inner Red Quarters (which houses the assembly hall of the Lamas, chapels, 10,000 shrines, and a vast library of Buddhist scriptures).

Temples and monasteries were all built by Tibetan Buddhist followers. All decorations—plated statues, elaborate frescoes, and expensive silk hangings—were bought and paid for by donations. The following list contains only a portion of all Tibetan Buddhist Monasteries, as many of the Monasteries were destroyed when Tibet was annexed by China.

== Songtsän Gampo ==
Songtsän Gampo founded the first two Tibetan Buddhist temples in Lhasa. He married two Buddhist brides: a Nepalese princess and a Chinese princess. He built each wife a temple to hold each of their Buddha statues (later, the statues switched temples). Gampo changed Rasa ("land of the goat"), the name of the region, to Lhasa ("land of the god").

- Jokhang: The Jokhang temple housed the Nepalese queen's statue of Akshobya Buddha. Now, this temple houses the gold statue of the crowned Buddha. This temple has become the holy center of Tibet. It consists of a vast number of assembly halls. Dark chapels were built around and above the earliest shrines. These chapels were decorated in the ancient Buddhist style of Nepal and India. The exterior is decorated with curtains and drapes. These drapes constantly change in color and are animated by the wind.
- Ramoche: The Ramoche Temple housed the Chinese queen's statue of Sakyamuni Buddha, known as Jowo. It is the second holiest shrine in Lhasa. It is designed with simplistic lines. The exterior walls slope to contain loose rubble and are resistible to earthquakes. Around the roofs edge are heavy, dark friezes that depict the firewood stacked on the roofs of peasant dwellings. In western Tibet, the windows are framed in black to keep away demons. In the east, they are white. The upper level of the temple were apartments for monks and dignitaries. The windows of the apartments consisted of long wooden latticework. These latticework were sealed with translucent paper because glass was not yet introduced. They were insulated by white cotton drapes bordered in blue. The open porches were covered by tent material woven from yak hair to keep the cold out. Sixty percent of the exterior walls were draped with cloth.

== Chorten ==
Small temples called chorten are found everywhere in Tibet. The design can vary, from roundish walls to squarish, four-sided walls. Some of these temples have relics of monks or other precious items. They are decorated with different depictions of the elements and nirvana symbolizing when the Buddha reached enlightenment. There are eight types of chorten, but only two-three are common in Tibet. It is considered a good deed of merit to either restore the temple or to walk around the temple in a clockwise direction.

- 'Chorten of Illumination': It is a temple with a square base that has steps leading to a circular drum, crested by parasols, figures of the sun and moon, and a flame.
- 'Chorten of 100,000 Images': the largest chorten in Tibet, located in Gyantse.

== Tibetan monasteries ==
- Samye: The first monastery in Tibet built by Trisong. It reflects the Indian influence on Tibetan architecture (Odantapuri in current-day Bihar was used as a model). The central assembly hall is surrounded by a circular wall that encloses four other temples. It is oriented with the four directions—North, south, east, and west—are marked out creating a mandala (sacred circle). It remains in much of its original form.
- Drolma Lhakhang*: Atisa founded this monastery in Nyethang (approx. twelve miles SW of Lhasa), an area where he died. Drolma Lhakhang is the name for Tara, a famous female bodhisattva. This monastery was not destroyed by the Chinese Red Guards because, at the time of the Cultural Revolution, the Government of Bengal requested for it to remain, as this site is sacred to Bengali people since Atisa originated from Bengal. A relic from Naropa is in this site. The exterior has long open-porch, symmetrical windows. The interior has several representations and frescoes of bodhisattva Tara. These representations are depicted in natural pigment white, blue, green, and red.
- Sakya: Dedicated to the Sakya lineage of Tibetan Buddhism, a portion of the monastery is preserved today. This portion is a massive, fortress-like rectangular section that was built in the sixteenth century. There are 12-foot-thick walls enclosing a grand assembly hall and library.
  - Jyekundo: This monastery was built for the Sakya lineage too. Its walls were painted with Sakya's colors—blue-gray, red, and white—in vertical stripes.
- Lo Gekar: This monastery is located in a lonely valley in the Mustang Kingdom. It is considered to be a perfect example of early Tibetan temples. Its size is modest, with a central assembly hall encircled by a covered pathway. This pathway allows pilgrims to circumambulate the shrine. The hall holds the altar with holy images of lamas and incarnations of the Buddha's virtues. The hall is only lit by a skylight. The temple also has apartments and a few cells for the lama and his pupils. Surrounding the monastery are niches containing prayer wheels. The exterior reflects harmonious proportions and sloping walls that lead one's eye to the friezes bordering the flat roof.

== Caves ==
There are dozens of cave cities (hollowed out of sandy cliffs) in the Mustang Kingdom. Caves were used prior to wood constructed monasteries because monks were similar to hermits and would like to be isolated. These caves were constructed by sculptors and engineers, rather than architects because clay and rock were used rather than wood. In the caves, there would be columns constructed out of these materials (and they appeared to be as solid and smooth as wood). In deep caves, like in the isolated valleys of Zanskar, the assembly halls are deep in the cavern and the monk's cells come out in a waterfall formation. This building technique took the abruptly ending plateau rise of mountains and dug into the steep walls to create caves. These cave dwellings were close to trade routes were monks could get donations while practicing a semi-monastic life.
