= Nalanda Buddhist Institute =

Buddhist monastic school in Punakha District, Bhutan

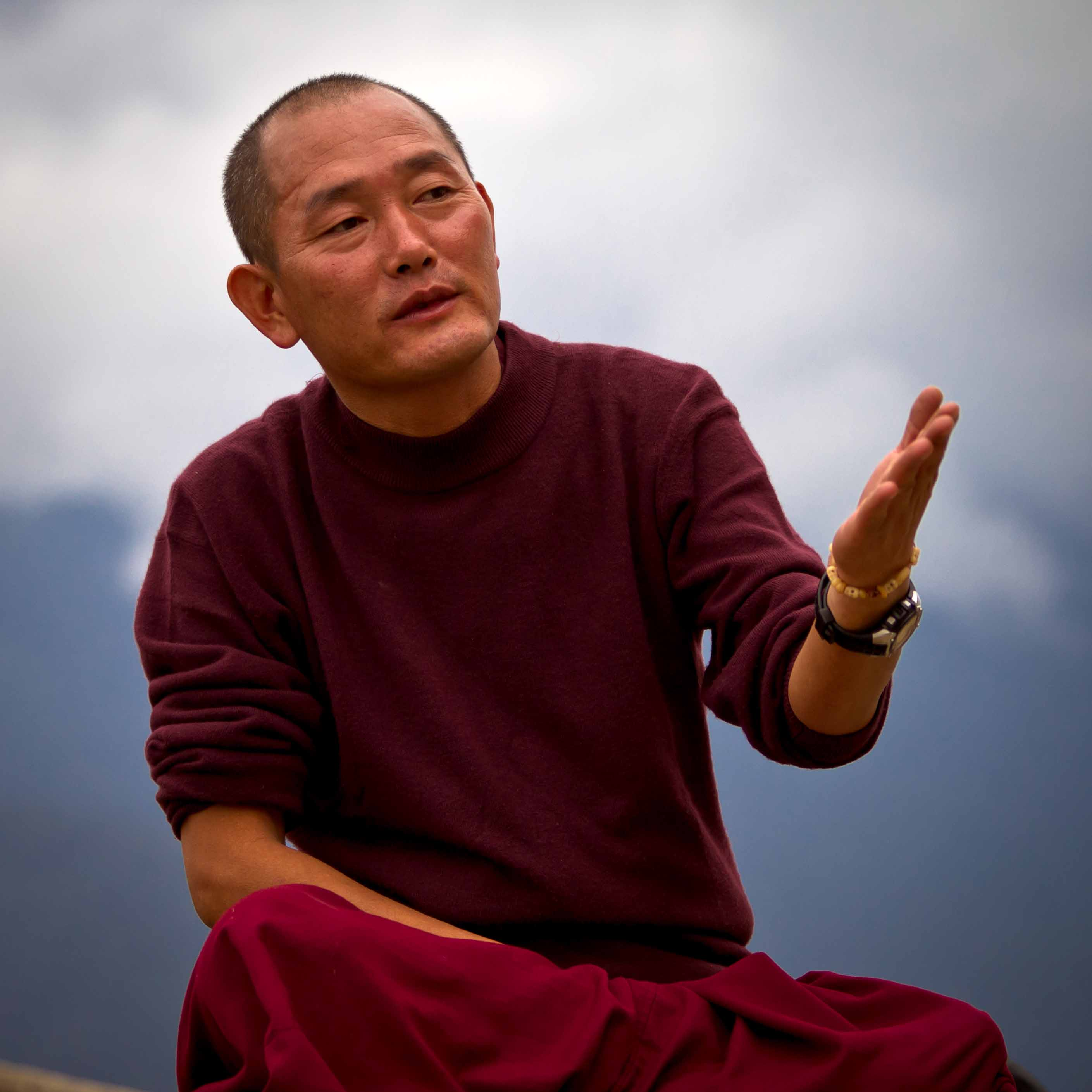
- Principal Khenpo Dendup

- Location within Bhutan

Religion
- Affiliation: Tibetan Buddhism
- Sect: Kagyu
- Leadership: 2013-present: Khenpo Sherub Wangchuk (lopen Thendu)

Location
- Location: Punakha Bhutan
- Country: Bhutan
- Coordinates: 27°32′27″N 89°49′26″E

Architecture
- Founder: Je Shakya Rinchen
- Established: 1754

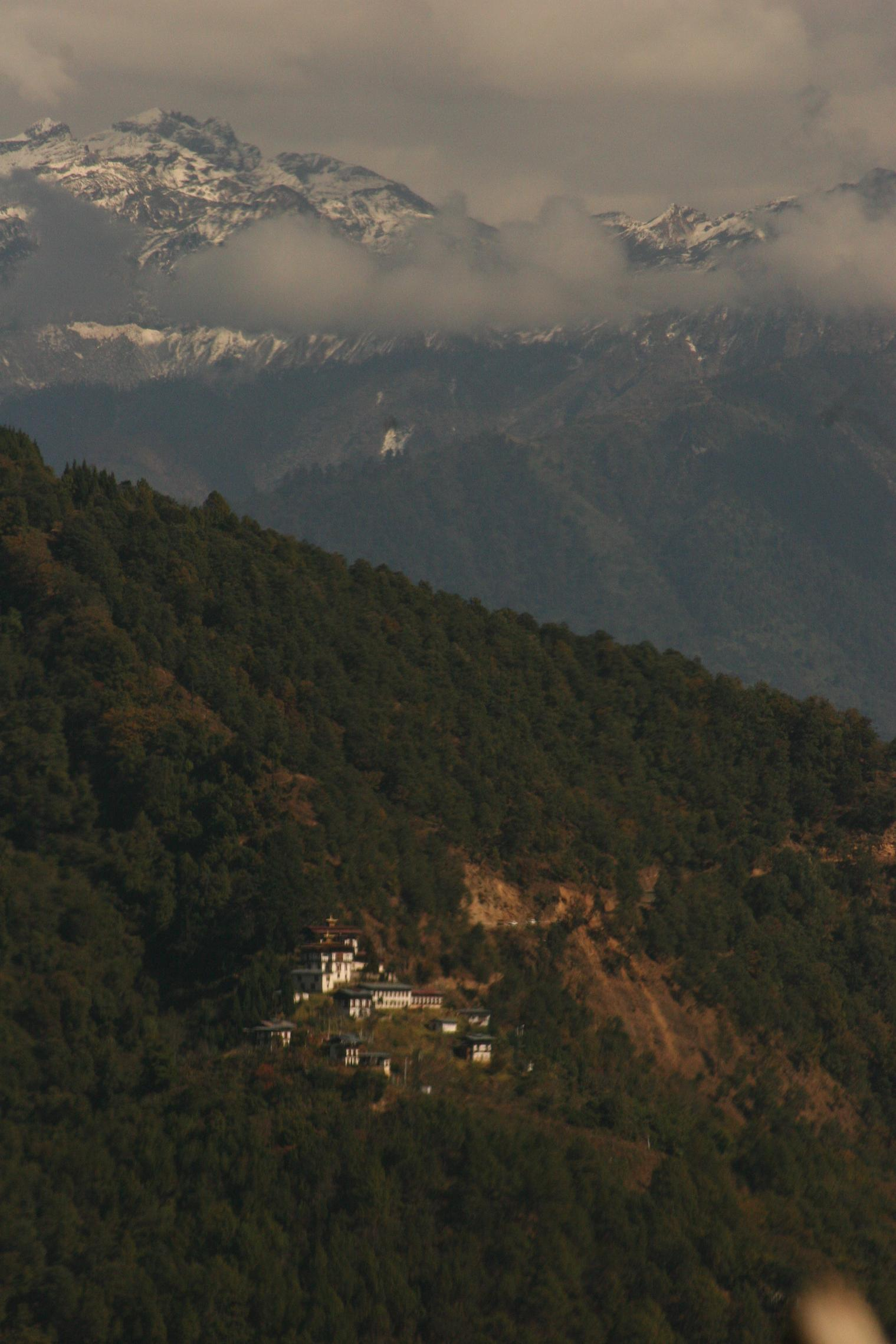
View of Nalanda Buddhist Institute from Dochu La (pass)

Nalanda Buddhist Institute (NBI), also known locally as Daley Goenpa or Dalida, is a Buddhist monastic school (shedra) in the western part of the Punakha District (Dzongkhag) in Bhutan. It is below Talo Monastery and above Walakha, about a 25-minute drive from the main highway to Punakha. The name Nalanda means "insatiable giving".

== Foundation of Nalanda Monastery ==
In 1757, the 9th Je Khenpo, Gyalwang Shakya Rinchen Rinpoche, considered to be a reincarnation of Rechung Dorje Drakpa, founded the Nalanda Monastery in Punakha. Shakya Rinchen was from Sha Rueb Samchokha in the Wangdue Phodrang District. Rechunga was one of two extraordinary disciples of Milarepa in the Kagyu Buddhist lineage. He was known as the "moon like" disciple of Milarepa and travelled to India to bring back profound teachings to Tibet. These important teachings were presented to Milarepa who absorbed them into the Kagyu lineage.

== The "Two Nalandas: Bhutan and India" ==
At the time when this monastery was built, the ancient Nalanda University in India was a very holy and sacred place. The original Nalanda University is located in what was known as Magadha that is now near present-day Patna, the capital of the present day state of Bihar, India.

The people in Bhutan made great efforts to visit this special holy place at least once in their lifetimes. However, there were no roads and people had to walk to India. As a result, the journey was very unsafe and people were at risk of being robbed or worse. On arrival in India, people from Bhutan faced many difficulties including dealing with differences in food, culture, and language, as well as being in an unfamiliar place.

As a way of accommodating the people's desire to visit Nalanda, Gyalwang Shakya Rinchen Rinpoche built this monastery in Bhutan and named it after the Nalanda University in India. Phajoding Monastery, located in the mountains outside of Thimphu, was the first monastery that Gyalwang Shakya Rinchen Rinpoche constructed. Nalanda Monastery is the second monastery he founded in Bhutan and is known as the "Second Nalanda".

It is said that the power of the Nalanda Monastery in Bhutan is no different than that of the Nalanda University in India. Whatever merit (result of positive action through compassion) is achieved at Nalanda Monastery in Bhutan is equivalent to the merit that is gained at Nalanda University in India.

== Founding - Auspicious signs ==
Gyalwang Shakya Rinchen Rinpoche had already completed building Phajoding Monastery in the hills above the Thimphu valley. He wondered where he should build the next monastery. The monk body was moving from Thimphu Dzong to Punakha, as is tradition, to spend the winter months in Punakha Dzong. As he was walking over Dochu La (pass), he saw eight vultures flying to an area on the side of the hills above the river. Gyalwang Shakya Rinchen Rinpoche suspected that maybe these vultures were the eight original scholars (pandits) from Nalanda University in India. Therefore, he sought confirmation in a dream and the eight scholars appeared and gave him a teaching. Based on the selection of this site by the vultures and the dream of the eight scholars, this location was chosen as the place where he built Nalanda Monastery.

During Gyalwang Shakya Rinchen's lifetime, Nalanda Monastery in Bhutan was a thriving Buddhist teaching institution with a renowned reputation. After Gyalwang Shakya Rinchen's final thugdham (dzongkha) /maha Samādhi (pali/sanscrit), slowly the teachings stopped and the great institute lay dormant. Attempts to revive the teaching at Nalanda Monastery happened several times by different teachers but after the teachers departed, the monk community again shrank and were insufficient to serve the community or sustain teaching.

Eventually, the uncle of His Majesty, the Fourth King, Jigme Singye Wangchuk, Dorji Lopen Yoenten Gyaltsen, requested permission from the King to open an official Buddhist shedra. In 1991, His Majesty gave permission for Nalanda Monastery to become a shedra and in 1992, two lopens (teachers) opened the shedra with 20 monks. Over time, the number of lopens and students has increased. As of 2014, there are 6 lopens and 125 students who range from 8 to 28 years of age.

=== The Eight Disappearing Indians ===
While constructing the original temple of Nalanda in Bhutan, Gyalwang Shakya Rinchen Rinpoche saw eight men from India in a small valley next to the building site. He realised that these eight Indians must be the eight scholars (pandits) of the original Nalanda University in India. When he went to find them to see if this was true, they had disappeared. The disappearance of the Indians was taken as confirmation that these indeed were the great eight scholars (pandits) of Nalanda University.

The eight scholars of Nalanda University are known as the Six Ornaments of the Southern Continent and the Two Excellent Ones. This refers to eight of the greatest and most distinguished scholars of Nalanda University. The Six Ornaments include: Nāgārjuna, Aryadeva, Asaṅga, Vasubandhu, Dignāga, and Dharmakīrti. The Two Excellent Ones are Gunaprabha and Shakyaprabha. Each of these great scholars wrote extensive, elaborate, and profound Buddhist philosophical commentaries that are still studied today throughout monasteries and nunneries. In order to praise and honour them for their auspicious appearance in the valley, Gyalwang Shakya Rinchen Rinpoche himself built clay statues of each of them. These statues can be seen inside the lower shrine room of the upper temple (lhakang).

== Upper lhakang - Nalanda Temple ==
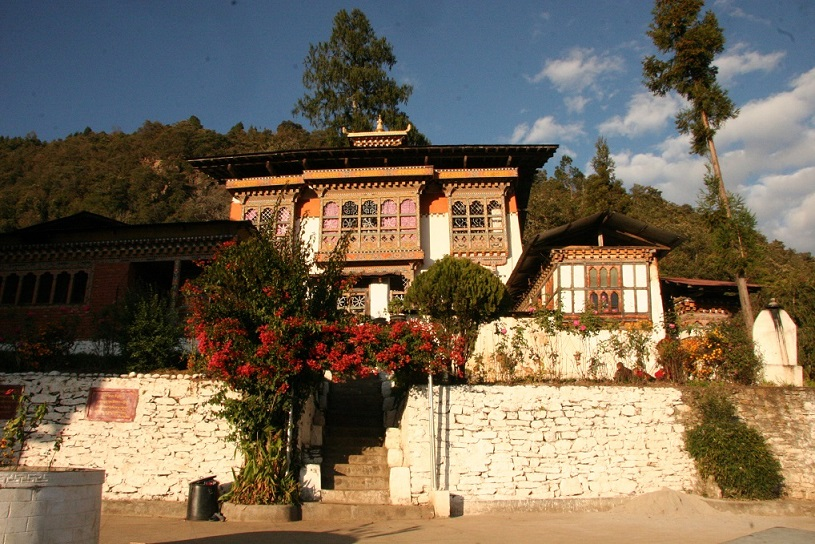
Nalanda temple

The upper temple (lhakang) was originally as only a single story building that was later extended to a second storey by Je Jambashinyen, the 50th Je Khenpo of Bhutan.

=== Gyalwang Shakya Rinchen (upper) shrine room ===
==== Central altar piece ====
Gyalwang Shakya Rinchen Rinpoche Statue On the main altar of the upper shrine room stands a clay statue of Gyalwang Shakya Rinchen Rinpoche, the founder of Nalanda Monastery. He is sitting in a pose of teaching. He is dressed as the incarnation of Sambhogakaya, the manifestation of a Buddha ornately dressed who possesses complete pure qualities. He is wearing the six ornaments of the pāramitā (the six perfections) which include a five leaf crown, wrist bracelets, and ankle bracelets.

==== Main altar (left to right) ====
- Far left: Yonten Thaye, 13th Je Khenpo, clay statue one of Gyalwang Shakya Rinchen Rinpoche's two main disciples.
- Second left: Kunga Jamtsho, 12th Je Khenpo, clay statue. The second of Gyalwang Shakya Rinchen Rinpoche's two main disciples.
- Left: Lodro Gyeltsen, 39th Je Khenpo, also wearing Sambhogakaya ornaments.
- Right: Jampyel Shinyen, 50th Je Khenpo, clay statue. The builder of the second storey of the main Nalanda temple.
- Second right: Namgyälma (Ushnishavijaya), clay statue. Gyalwang Shakya Rinchen Rinpoche's guardian and tutelary deity. He made this statue himself. While making the statue, he got distracted and began making a Green Tara statue. Namgyalma reminded him to make the statue of her. Hence, of the 3 faces of Namgyalma, the central face resembles Green Tara.
- Far right: Jow Je Pelden Atisha (Atiśa), the great Indian scholar.

==== Alcove ====
Access is restricted to the alcove where the main statue, Dorji Yudenma/Shengchong Wangmo, resides. There are a number of other small statues. The alcove entrance is flanked by clay and wooden statues of Yarsapa on the left, the protector deity of the valley; and his sister Pelzom Gyalmo, on the right.

==== Special Wall paintings (clockwise from main altar) ====
Gyalwang Shakya Rinchen Rinpoche in a previous life, as Tsang Khenchen Pelden Jamtsho, painted by Gyalwang Shakya Rinchen Rinpoche on canvas. Gyalwang Shakya Rinchen Rinpoche painted by himself on canvas and relocated to the upper lhakang from the original lower lhakang.

=== Buddhas of the Three Times (lower) shrine room ===
==== Central altar pieces ====
- Centre: Shakyamuni Buddha statue
- Left: Chenrezig (Avalokitesvara) statue in standing
- Right: Jampa Gonpo (Buddha Maitreya) statue in standing
- Far Right: Buddha of the Past (Buddha Kashyapa) in sitting
- Far Left: Buddha of the Future (Buddha Maitreya) in sitting
- Farthest Left: Chenrezig (Avalokitesvara) statue in sitting

On either end of the main altar are alcoves for statues of the eight Indian scholars (the eight pandits of Nalanda University in India who were seen by Gyalwang Shakya Rinchen Rinpoche in the valley) 8 Indian Scholars or Panditas statues known as the Six Ornaments of the Southern Continent and the Two Excellent Ones:

- Lopen Ludup (Nagarjuna)
- Lopen Aryadeva (Aryadeva)
- Lopen Thokmyed (Asanga)
- Lopen Yignyen (Vasubandhu)
- Lopen Choglang (Dignaga)
- Lopen Choedrak (Dharmakirti)
- Lopen Shacha Yoe (Shakyaprabha)
- Lopen Yonten Yoe (Gunaprabha)

== Lower lhakang - Sonam Gatshel Temple ==
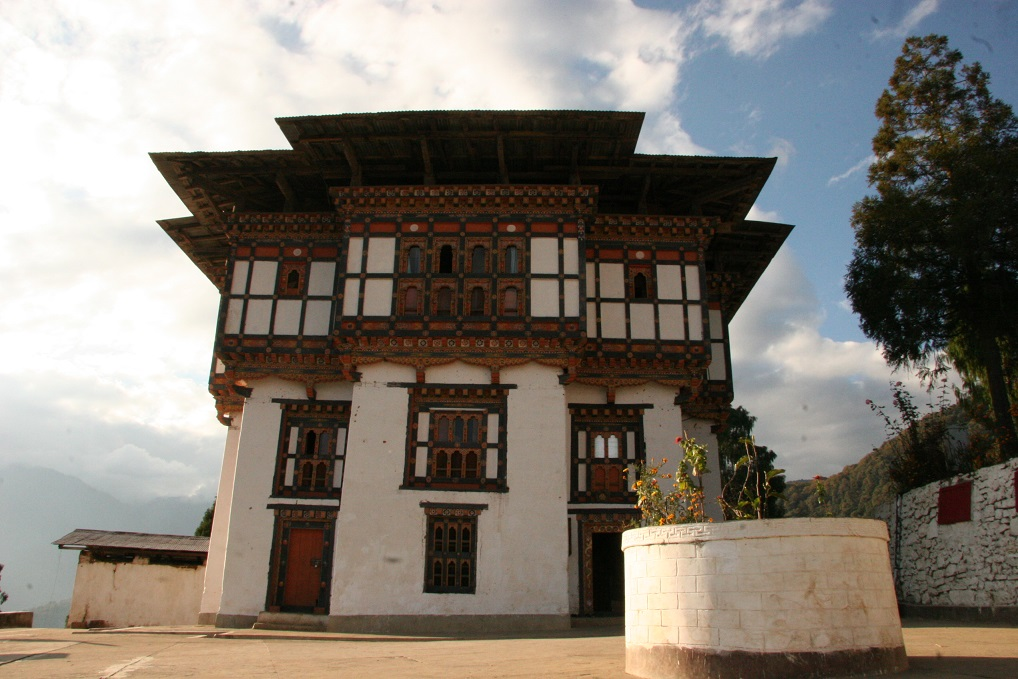
Sonam Gatshel temple

One of Shakya Rinchen Rinpoche's main disciples built the original lower temple (Sonam Ghatsel temple) but it was destroyed by fire. It was rebuilt in the 1960s, during the Fourth King's (Jigme Singye Wangchuck) reign, with the support of the Queen Great Grandmother Ashi Kesang Choden Wangchuk.

=== Upper shrine room ===
==== Main altar ====
Future Buddha Gyalwa Jampa (Buddha Maitreya) is the central statue.

==== Left of the altar ====
- Left: Tsepakmed (Buddha Amitabha) statue, Buddha of Long Life
- Second left: Namgyalma (Ushnishavijaya) statue
- Far left: Tara statue

==== Other statues of note ====
- Right of altar: (TBC)
- Right: Akshobhya Buddha
- Second right: Padmasambhava statue with consorts
- Far right: Jow Je Pelden Atisha (Atiśa) statue
- Other numerous statues

== Library ==
A library and a classroom were constructed in 2010 to house reference texts in Dzongkha, Sanskrit and English. These include books on Buddhist philosophy as well as English language, history, civic studies, geography and maths. Student monks can borrow these reference books for to support the monastic curriculum or for their own personal interest and learning.

== Shedra curriculum ==
A shedra is a Buddhist institute that includes the teaching of Buddhist philosophy, learning and playing of ritual instruments, making ritual cakes called tormas (Skt: balingta), reciting scriptures, conducting prayer ceremonies (pujas) for both special observance days and on behalf of members in the lay community. The technique of debate is used in the shedra as a way of verifying Buddhist logic and ensuring a firm understanding of Buddhist philosophy.

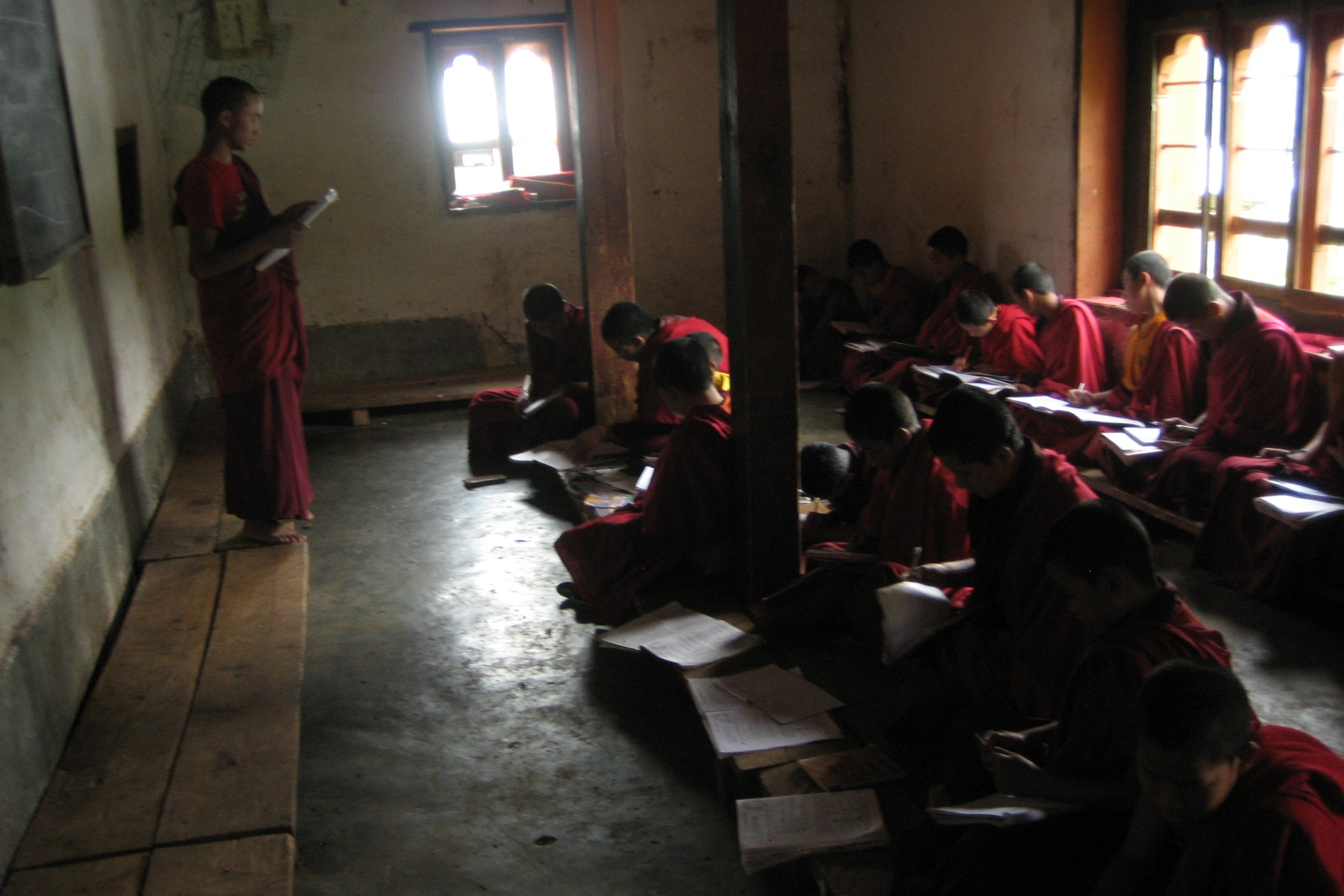
Junior students read scriptures

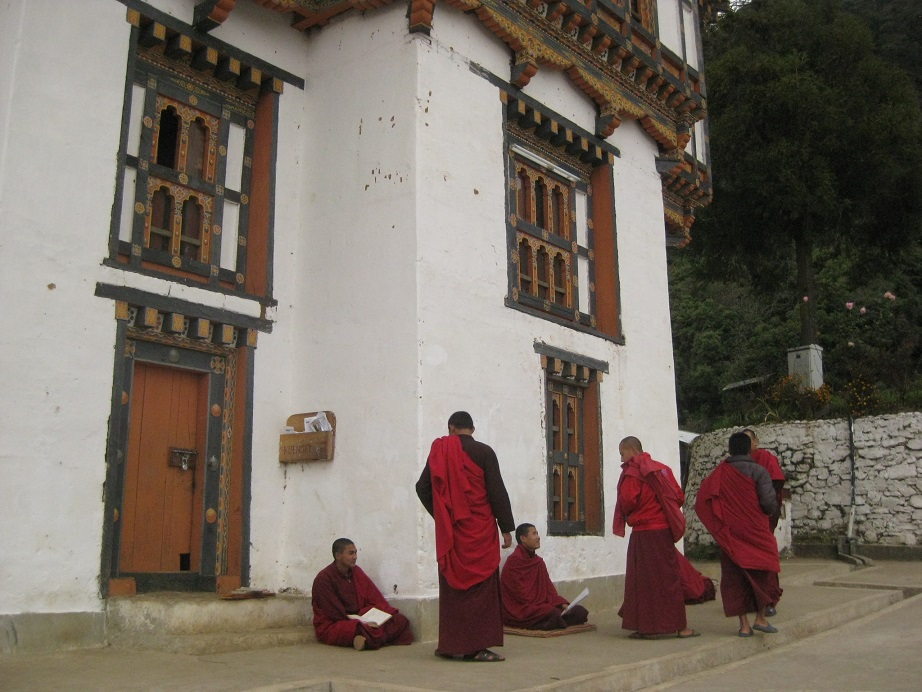
Senior students daily debating practice of buddhist philosophy

Debating practice requires at least one monk that is the answerer with at least another monk that is the questioner. The answerer must give a competent answer to the question or otherwise face further questioning. The debate of Buddhist logic continues between the questioner and answerer. The technique of debate in the shedra helps to dispel confusion and illusion about Buddhist philosophical teachings. It helps the mind to develop greater clarity about the nature of reality that includes the idea of a self and the experience of phenomena

== English Classes ==
Monks join NBI with a wide range of previous mainstream education. Some may not attended school at all whilst others may have completed Class X or even XII. Recognising the importance of English in modern Bhutan, ex-Principal Khenpo Tshewang introduced English classes in 2006 making use of students who had completed higher school grades or local volunteers, thus the ability and availability of teachers has varied over time. Nalanda Buddhist Institute divides students into four groups based on their ability with English. The monks learn speaking and conversational skills, vocabulary, reading, and writing. In addition to basic grammar, the monks are taught some subjects in English such as Buddhism, health and disease, and basic science. English examinations are not a part of the standard monastic education but NBI will conduct them from 2014. English classes are held six days a week between 7 and 8pm. The monastery happily welcomes visitors to visit the monastery and speak English with the monks. The monks appreciate the opportunity to practice their English and enjoy learning about other people, their countries, and their cultures.

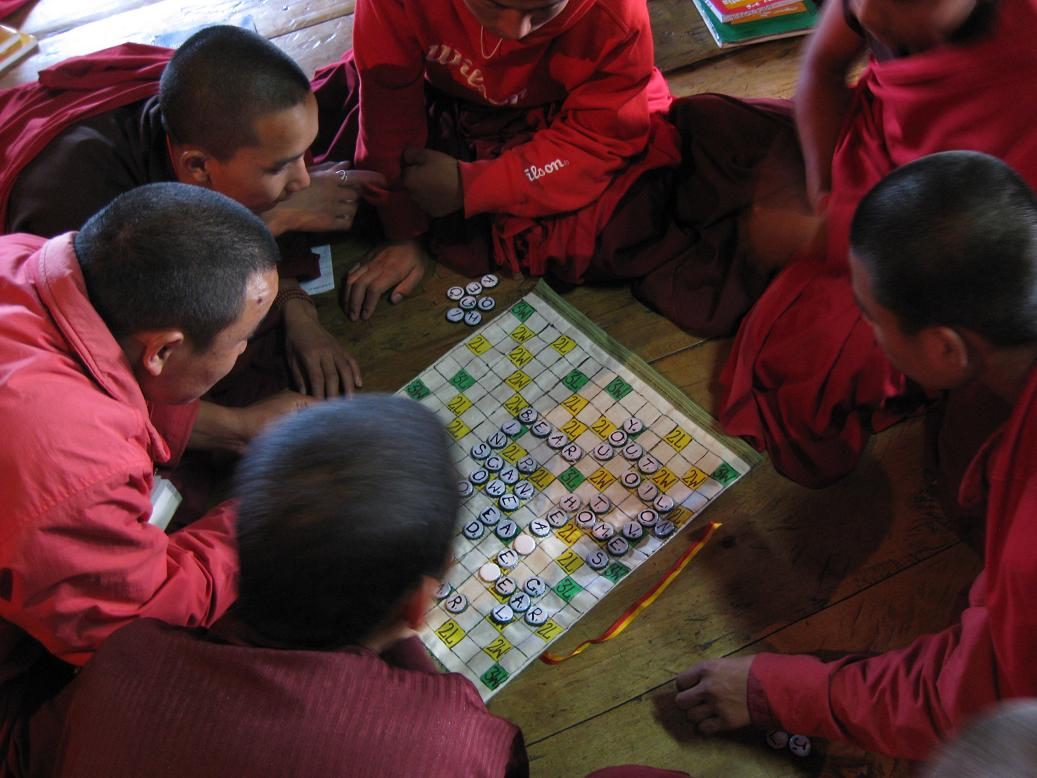
Monks practice spelling by playing homemade Scrabble

== Inaugural Translation Class ==
Under the direction and guidance of Khenpo Sonam Tshewang, the first dedicated Translation Class began at Nalanda Buddhist Institute in 2013. The Translation Class is a three year course where students focus on learning and improving English speaking, vocabulary, reading, and writing skills. The goal is for the monks to translate documents as well as interpret for lopens (teachers) speaking in Dzongkha or Chokey to an English speaking audience. English is used in tandem with Dzongkha (the official language of Bhutan), and Chokey (Classical Tibetan); the spiritual language used in many Buddhist texts; during translation. Students learn how to translate between the three languages. The class focuses on learning Buddhist texts in English to enable translation into Dzongkha or Chokey, becoming familiar with the English vocabulary in common use for Buddhist concepts. In order to ensure full understanding and accurate translation students, other non-religious subjects are taught, such as planetary science and the secular view of the origin of the universe, basic anatomy and physiology, other religions, and traditions of Buddhism.

== Computer Laboratory ==
The monastery got its first computers in 2007 and a small lab was established where monks could practice typing and use of basic software. The monastery is upgrading its computer laboratory. With support from a local company in Thimphu and some government assistance, the monastery is acquiring ten new computers and furniture. The goal is for the computer laboratory to expand to thirty computers as the opportunity becomes available. The monks will begin lessons that will focus on: learning typing in both English and Dzongkha, using basic software and other computer skills although there is no internet connection. Future plans include creating Buddhist texts called pechas and preservation of Buddhist texts.

== Three-Year Retreat Centre ==
The retreat centre is located on the hillside below Nalanda Buddhist Institute. There are six cottages which can house twelve meditators for three-year retreats. A small temple is also part of the retreat centre.

== Being Self Sufficient ==
The monastery is looking into opportunities to become more self-sufficient while preserving and maintaining the precious environment and resources. The monastery has goals for solar water heating, solar cooking equipment or other energy efficient cooking equipment, a greenhouse for growing vegetables, and a clean water supply that includes watershed protection and conservation management.

== Ganden Jesa Dor (Heaven Viewing Rock) ==
Gyalwang Shakya Rinchen Rinpoche was sitting on a big stone and appreciating the scenery around Nalanda when he saw a vision of Tusita Heaven (Ganden Heaven). He called to his two main disciples Je Kuenga and Je Yuenten. When they came, he told them to sit on the stone and then held them by the waist. When they looked at the same spot where Gyalwang Shakya Rinchen Rinpoche had been looking they also saw Tusita Heaven. The stone where they sat is now a sacred spot at the monastery. The stone has the special name, Ganden Jesa Dor or Heaven Viewing Rock.

== Gyalwang Shakya Tenpi Ningchey ==
The tulku (reincarnation) of Gyalwang Shakya Rinchen known as Gyalwang Tenpi Ningchey Rinpoche, has resided at Nalanda Buddhist Institute since the age of four when he was recognised as a reincarnation of Gyalwang Shakya Rinchen Rinpoche.

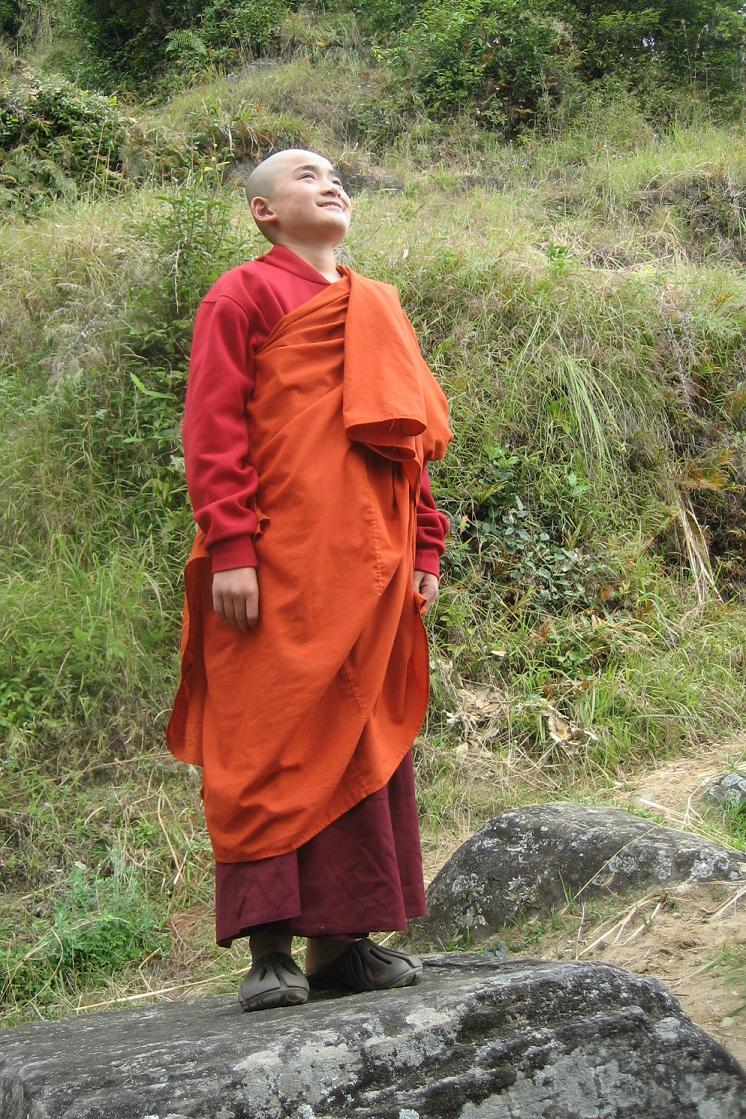
Tulku Gyelwang Tenpi Ningchey Rinpoche standing on Ganden Viewing Rock

At the age of two or three, he recalled his previous life as Gyalwang Shakya Rinchen Rinpoche. The monk body (Dratshang Lhentshog) of Bhutan formally recognised him as the reincarnation of Gyalwang Shakya Rinchen Rinpoche.

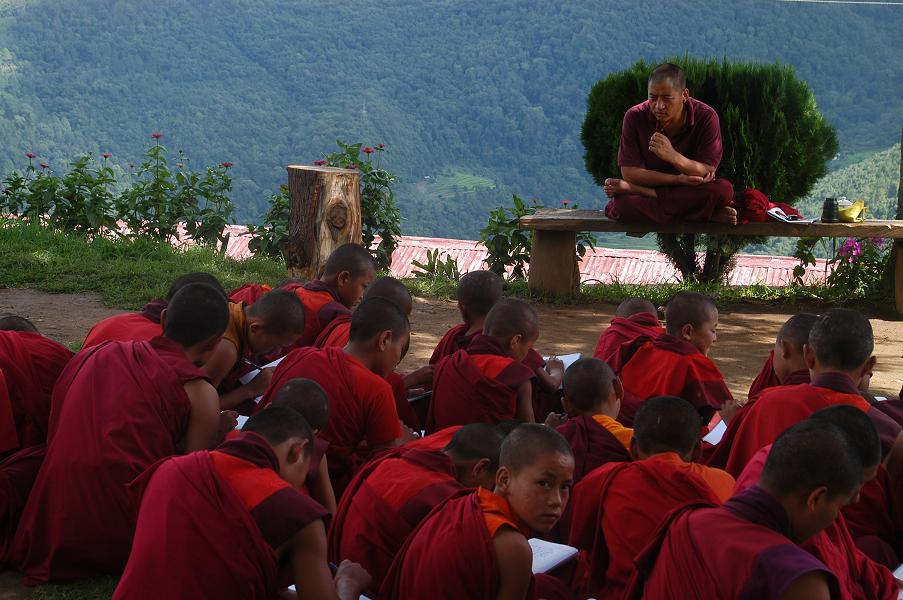
1992-1995, 2004-2013 Former Principal Sonam Tshewang teaching Buddhist philosophy

== Principals of Nalanda Buddhist Institute ==
Date	Principal		
1992 - 1995	Khenpo Sonam Tshewang		
1995 - 2000	Lopen Phurba		
2000 - 2004	Lopen Thinley		
2004 - 2013	Khenpo Sonam Tshewang		
2013–2018	Khenpo Dendup	2019–present	Khenpo Pema Tenzin
