= Qüxü County =

Qüxü 曲水县 • ཆུ་ཤུར་རྫོང་། Chushur, Chushul, Qushui
- County
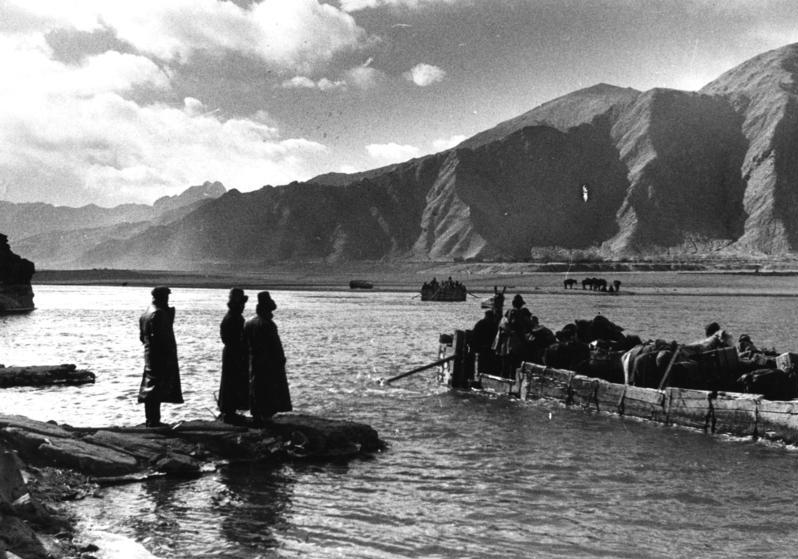
- Yarlung Tsangpo ferry near Qüxü 1939

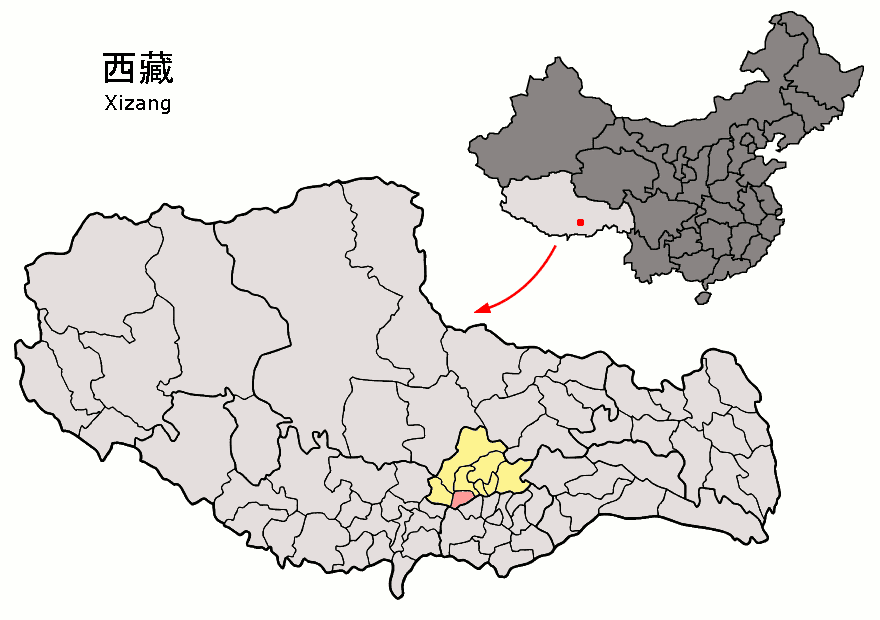
- Location of Qüxü County (red) within Lhasa City (yellow) and the Tibet Autonomous Region

- Location in Tibet Autonomous Region Qüxü (China)
- Coordinates (Qüxü government): 29°21′11″N 90°44′38″E
- Country: China
- Region: Tibet
- Prefecture-level city: Lhasa
- County seat: Qüxü

Area
  - Total: 1,624 km^{2} (627 sq mi)

Population (2020)
  - Total: 41,851
  - Density: 25.77/km^{2} (66.74/sq mi)
- Time zone: UTC+8 (China Standard)
- Website: www.qushuixian.gov.cn

Qüxü County

Chinese name
- Simplified Chinese: 曲水县
- Traditional Chinese: 曲水縣
Transcriptions
Standard Mandarin
- Hanyu Pinyin: Qūshuǐ Xiàn

Tibetan name
- Tibetan: ཆུ་ཤུར་རྫོང་།
Transcriptions
- Wylie: chu shur rdzong
- Tibetan Pinyin: Qüxü Zong

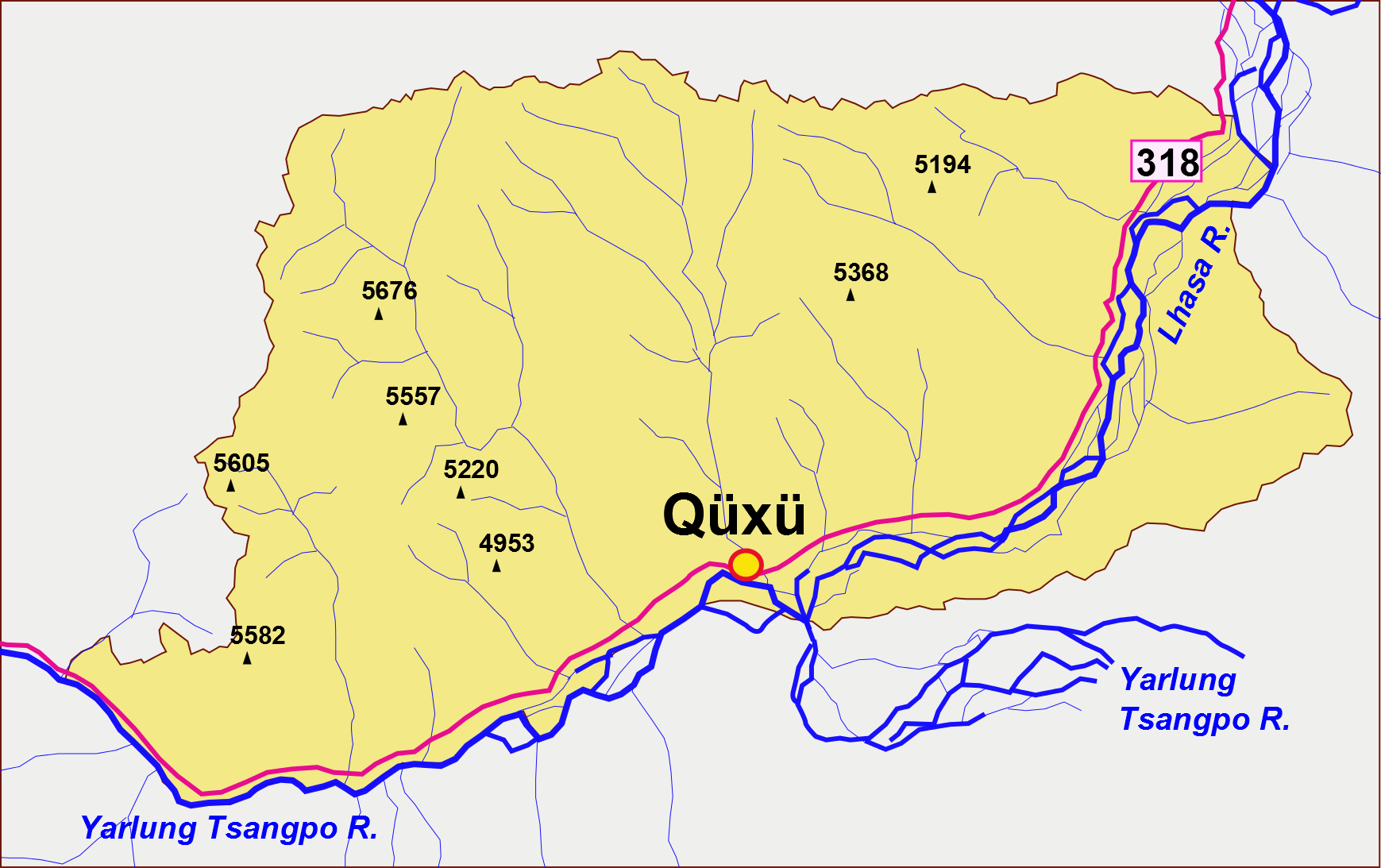
Sketch map

Qüxü County is a county in the Lhasa southwest of the main center of Chengguan, Tibet, China. It is mountainous in the northwest, flatter near the Lhasa River, which runs through the east of the county, and the Yarlung Tsangpo—forming the southern border. The population as of 2000 was 29,690, mostly engaged in agriculture or animal husbandry. The county is home to the Nyethang Drolma Lhakhang Temple.

== Geography ==
In the Tibetan language, the name means "water ditch." Qüxü County has a total area of 1,680 square kilometres (650 sq mi), with an average elevation of 3,650 metres (11,980 ft). The county is in the Yarlung Tsangpo valley, and is mostly relatively flat, but rises to the Nyainqêntanglha Mountains in the north. The Lhasa River runs south through the eastern part of the county to its confluence with the Yarlung Tsangpo River, which forms the southern boundary of the county. The lowest elevation is 3,500 meters, and the highest summit elevation is 5894 meters.

Qüxü County has a temperate semi-arid plateau monsoon climate zone with 3,000 hours of annual sunshine hours on average and 150 days a year without frost. Annual precipitation is 441.9 millimeters (17.40 in). Natural disasters such as flash floods, landslides, drought, sandstorms, pests and diseases are common. Mineral resources found in the area include mainly corundum, limestone, granite, peat and so on. Wild animals include Himalayan blue sheep, pheasants, deer, leopard and brown bear. Medicinal plants include Chinese caterpillar fungus, Fritillaria and Codonopsis.

== Administrative divisions ==
Qüxü County includes 2 towns and 4 townships:

Name	Tibetan	Wylie	Chinese	Pinyin
Towns
Qüxü Town	ཆུ་ཤུར་ཆོས་འཁོར།	chu shur grong rdal	曲水镇	Qūshuǐ Zhèn
Dagar Town	རྟ་དཀར་ཆོས་འཁོར།	rta dkar grong rdal	达嘎镇	Dágā Zhèn
Townships
Caina Township	ཚལ་སྣ་ཤང་།	tshal sne shang	才纳乡	Cáinà Xiāng
Nam Township	གནམ་ཤང་།	gnam shang	南木乡	Nánmù Xiāng
Nyêtang Township	མཉེས་ཐང་ཤང་།	mnyes thang shang	聂当乡	Nièdāng Xiāng
Carbanang Township	མཚར་པ་ནང་ཤང་།	tsha rags shang	茶巴拉乡	Chábālā Xiāng

== Demographics ==
The fifth census in 2000 recorded a population of 29,690 as follows—Qüxü Town 7,406, Nyêtang Township 4,103, Carbanang Township 3,831, Caina Township 4,400, Nam Township 2,909 and Dagar Township 7,041. The total labor force was 15,640 of whom 7,948 were male and 7,692 female. The county seat has been growing fast, and had 5,000 people by 2002. The Fourth Jamgon Kongtrul was born in the county in 1995.

== Infrastructure ==
As of 2002 , there was one County Middle School, and 18 primary schools. 98% of the population receive radio coverage and 94% has television access. There are fourteen small hydropower stations in Qüxü County with a total installed capacity of 1780 kilowatts, creating an annual four million kW·h of electricity. China National Highway 318 runs through the county from Lhasa towards the west. Bridges span the Lhasa River and the Yarlung Tsangpo River. The county is also home to a prison.

== Economy ==
Qüxü County is semi-agricultural and crops grown are mainly highland barley, winter wheat, spring wheat, peas and rapeseed. Apples and walnuts are also produced. Animal husbandry is also strong, with the main animals farmed including yak, cattle, goats, sheep, horses, donkeys, pigs, and chickens. As of 2002, the per capita net income of farmers and herdsmen was 1,960 yuan. The county has been rapidly developing organic farming of snow peach, tobacco, tulips, chrysanthemum and saffron. Farm products have been sold in other parts of China under the "Lhasa Pure" brand. They include barley, barley wine, barley tea, yak milk, Tibetan Chicken, Rhodiola, Cordyceps, Maca and glacier water.

In Junba village (俊巴渔村) about 70% of the households manufacture small leather items in traditional styles for sale to domestic and foreign tourists. Other women in the county are engaged in hand-weaving, preserving traditional styles, although as of 2015 working conditions were poor. Construction of a 2,100 square metres (23,000 sq ft) industrial park in Qüxü for small and medium enterprises began in September 2014, with completion expected in June 2015. Other enterprises include a factory for farm tools, and a grain and oil processing plant.

The Nyethang Drolma Lhakhang Temple is located in Qüxü County. The temple is said to have been founded in 1055 by Dromtön, a pupil of Atiśa. It is small, but has a unique architecture and many interesting statues. There are relics dating back to the Ming dynasty (1368–1644). It is operated by monks of the Gelug sect.

== Sources ==
- "Booming Lhasa Qushui". CCTV: China Central People's Radio. 2003-12-05.
- "Lhasa Qushui Introduction" (in Chinese). Chinese Government Network. Archived from the original on 2015-02-17.
- "Lhasa Qushui Introduction" (in Chinese). Lhasa Tourism.
- Li, Zhe (2014-07-18). "Lhasa Qushui rapid development of Pure Health Industry". China.org (in Chinese). Archived from the original on 2015-02-17.
- Liu, Huan (2014-12-04). "Traditional Junba village leather handicrafts" (in Chinese). Qushui Lhasa People's Government. Archived from the original on 2015-02-17.
- Miao, Zhao (2015-02-11). "Qushui Women's Federation survey of hand-woven art". Qushui Lhasa People's Government. Archived from the original on 2015-02-17.
- "Qushui & Duilongdeqing County". Scenic Chinese dictionary.
- "Qushui SME incubator industrial park has started construction" (in Chinese). Lhasa Municipal People's Government. 2014-09-30.
