= Dolma Kyab =

Tibetan writer and teacher

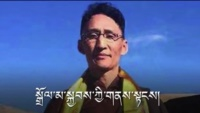

Dolma Kyab (or Zhuo Shique, Chinese : 卓史确 or 卓玛加(音)) (pen-name Lobsang Kelsang Gyatso), born in 1976, is a writer and teacher in his native Tibet. He was imprisoned at Chushur (Chinese: “Qushui”) Prison, which is located in a rural area south-west of his native home, Lhasa, Tibet. On March 9, 2005, he was arrested in Lhasa at the middle school where he was employed as a history teacher. On September 16, 2005, he was convicted and sentenced to 10 years in prison by the Lhasa People's Intermediate Court for the crime of stealing and/or passing on “state secrets.”

Dolma Kyab has received an extensive education having attended his local primary school and then his county middle school. He joined a Teachers Training Center in 1995 and taught at a school in Qilian County (in Haibei Tibetan Autonomous Prefecture). He later continued his studies at Peking University where he received a master's degree in 2002. In 2003, he traveled to India to learn English and Hindi. He is fluent in both his Native Tibetan and Chinese, as well as Japanese. As a writer he maintained a commentary manuscript written in Chinese, entitled Sao dong de Ximalayshan (“Himalaya on Stir”). It has 57 chapters written on various topics such as: democracy, the sovereignty of Tibet, Tibet under communism, colonialism, and religion and belief. He also began writing another manuscript which focused on his increasing concern for Tibet's environment and makes mention to sensitive topics like the geographical alterations that China has brought to Tibet as well as the location of various Chinese Military camps in the Tibet Autonomous Region (TAR).

After his arrest on March 9, 2005, he was taken to the TAR Public Security Bureau Detention Center, also known as “Seitru” in Tibetan. He was held and tried for “endangering state security;” (Chinese Criminal Law, Articles 110, 111) and was convicted and sentenced to 10 years imprisonment. An appeal was made by his family and was rejected on November 30, 2005, upholding the 10-year sentence.

While detained at Seitru he contracted tuberculosis and his subsequent transfer to Chushul Prison was barred until he received medical attention. In March 2006 he was reportedly transferred to Chushul Prison after receiving some medical treatment.

There is no official information about the charges against Dolma Kyab, but in a letter that was reportedly smuggled out of prison Dolma Kyab states that his sentence is linked to his unpublished book. In the letter, he appeals for help from the United Nations Commission on Human Rights.

A group of well-known Tibetian and Chinese writers have been petitioning for his release. Also, the International Campaign for Tibet (ICT), the PEN American Center and the Tibetan PEN have been following his case.

On 8 October 2015 it was reported that Dolma was released from prison after a decade. After his release from Qushui jail in Lhasa, Kyab was then taken to his home town.

== See also ==
Political prisoners
