= Qüxü =

Qüxü Chushur or Chusul or Chushul
- Township

Tibetan transcription(s)
  - Tibetan: ཆུ་ཤུར
  - Wylie transliteration: chu shur

Chinese transcription(s)
  - Traditional: 曲水镇
  - Pinyin: Qūshuǐ
- Location within Tibet
- Coordinates: 29°21′19″N 90°44′4″E
- Country: China
- Province: Tibet Autonomous Region
- Prefecture: Lhasa Prefecture
- County: Qüxü County
- Time zone: UTC+8 (CST)

Qüxü or Chushur or Chusul or Chushul is a town and township and capital of Qüxü County in the Lhasa Prefecture of the Tibet Autonomous Region of China. It is located 48 kilometers (30 mi) southwest of Lhasa and is connected directly by road. It lies on a river which soon joins the Yarlung Tsangpo river. The town has a notable prison, and as of 2009 incarcerated people such as Dolma Kyab. Lhasa Gonggar Airport lies to the southeast of the town.

== See also ==
- List of towns and villages in Tibet
