= Caina Township =

Caina
- Township

Chinese transcription(s)
  - Chinese: 才纳
  - Pinyin: Cáinà
- Location within Tibet
- Coordinates: 29°27′17″N 90°57′25″E
- Country: China
- Region: Tibet Autonomous Region
- Prefecture: Lhasa Prefecture
- County: Qüxü County
- Time zone: UTC+8 (China Standard)

Caina or Cainaxiang (Chinese: 才纳; pinyin: Cáinà) is a township in Qüxü County, Tibet Autonomous Region of China. Caina is located in the Lhasa River valley, 42 kilometres by road (about an hour's drive) southwest of Lhasa. The Caina Bridge was built over the Lhasa River in the early 1990s.

== See also ==
- List of towns and villages in the Tibet Autonomous Region
