= Royal Botanical Park, Lamperi =

Park in Bhutan

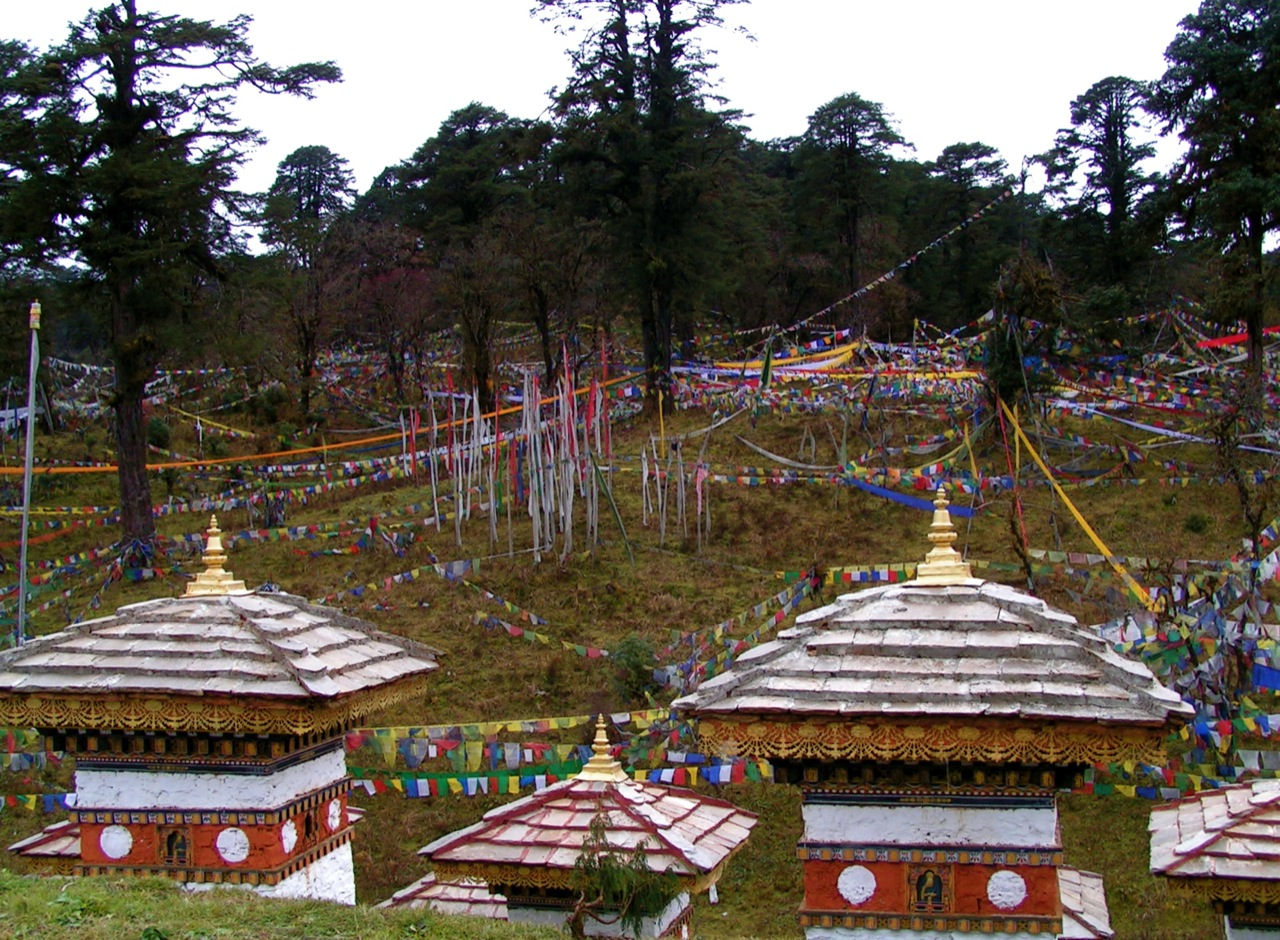
- Botanical garden within the park with chortens in the foreground on Dochula Pass
- Location: Thimphu, Punakha, Bhutan
- Area: 47 km^{2} (18 sq mi)
- Named for: Jigme Singye Wangchuck

Royal Botanical Park, Lamperi is the first botanical park in Bhutan and forms the backdrop of the Dochula Pass. The park forms a biological corridor of 120 km^{2} (47 mi^{2}) between Jigme Singye Wangchuck National Park and Jigme Dorji National Park and has a popular botanical garden within it which is spread over an area of 125 acres (51 ha). This is planted with 46 species of rhododendron of which 18 species are native to the park while the other 26 species are brought from other regions of Bhutan and planted here. These bloom during mid March to early August. The botanical garden of the park has within its limits the 108 stupas (chortens) at the Dochula Pass (3100m). The park was formally declared open in June 2008 to mark the anniversary of the Coronation of King Jigme Kesar Namgyel Wangchuk and centenary of Bhutan's monarchic rule. Mr. Phenden Gyamtsho is the Park Manager, heading a technical team of young, humble and hardworking staff. The park facility centre opens from 9 am to 5 pm in summer and from 9 am to 4 pm in winter. The park seriously embarks on waste management advocacy programs to educate the general public. Garbage IN and garbage OUT policy is being emphasised.

== Geography ==
The botanical park is situated between an elevation range of 2,100 metres (6,900 ft) and 3,750 metres (12,300 ft). The park forms the heart of the "tri-junction" of the hill ranges of Sinchula, Helela and Dochula. There is a botanical garden of rhododendrons with in it. The park has a lake known as Baritsho Lake which has religious sanctity as the local people give votive offerings. The park is at Lamperi 30 kilometres (19 mi) away from Thimpu.

== Trekking/hiking trails ==
There are trekking routes or trails such as the

- Rhododendron walk (1 km),
- Serchu Nature Trail (1 kilometre (0.62 mi)),
- Dochula Nature Trail (1.5 kilometres (0.93 mi));
- Lumitsawa Ancient Trail (4.7 kilometres (2.9 mi)),
- Lungchu Tshey Pilgrimage (3.5 kilometres (2.2 mi)), and the
- Thadna Jungle Walk (125 kilometres (78 mi)).

== Wildlife ==
Apart from the rhododendrons in the botanical park the other varieties of plants in the park consists of 115 species of ferns. Some of the other important trees are large oak, magnolia and birch. The park is also a popular bird watching area and 46 avifauna species have been identified. Some of the rare species reported are monal pheasants and blood pheasants (Ithaginis cruentus). There are 21 animal species identified in the park which includes musk deer, tiger, leopard, red panda and the leopard cat.
