= Dochula Pass =

High mountain pass in Bhutan

Dochu La
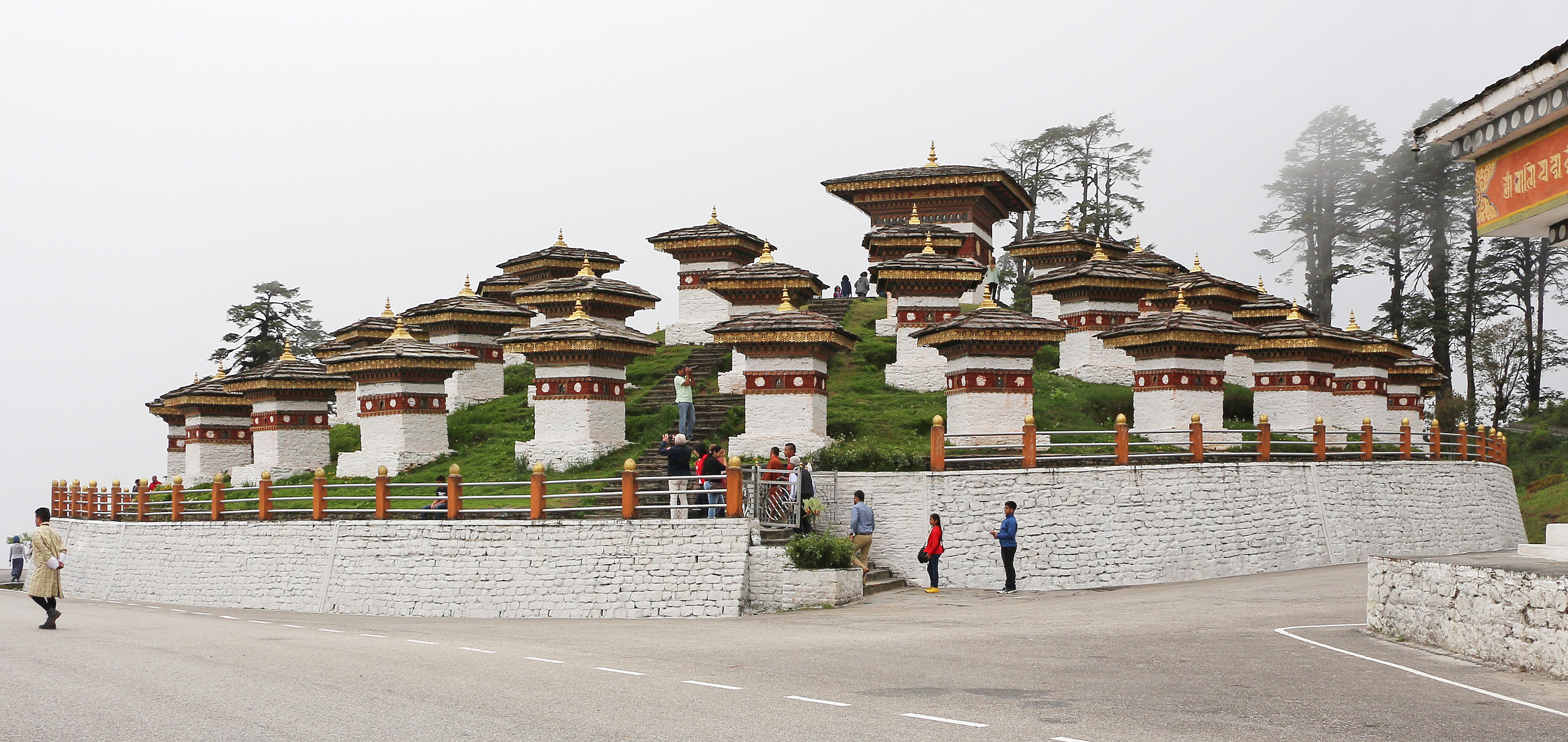
- Dochu La with 108 stupas or chortens in Thimphu on the east west road

- Location within Bhutan
- Elevation: 3,100 m (10,200 ft)

Location
- Location: East-West Road from Thimphu to Punakha 27°29'24"N 89°45'1"E
- Range: Himalayas
- Coordinates: 27°29′24″N 89°45′01″E

The Dochu La ( Dochu Pass; la means pass in Dzongkha) is a mountain pass in the snow covered Himalayas in Bhutan on the road from Thimphu to Punakha. 108 memorial chortens or stupas, known as the "Druk Wangyal Chortens", were built at the pass by Ashi Dorji Wangmo Wangchuk, the eldest Queen Mother, in memory of Bhutanese soldiers who died in 2003. There is also a monastery, called the Druk Wangyal Lhakhang (temple), built in honour of the fourth Druk Gyalpo (head of the state of Bhutan), Jigme Singye Wangchuck. The open ground in its front yard is a venue for the annual Dochula Druk Wangyel Festival. The pass is adjacent to the country's first Royal Botanical Park.

== Geography ==
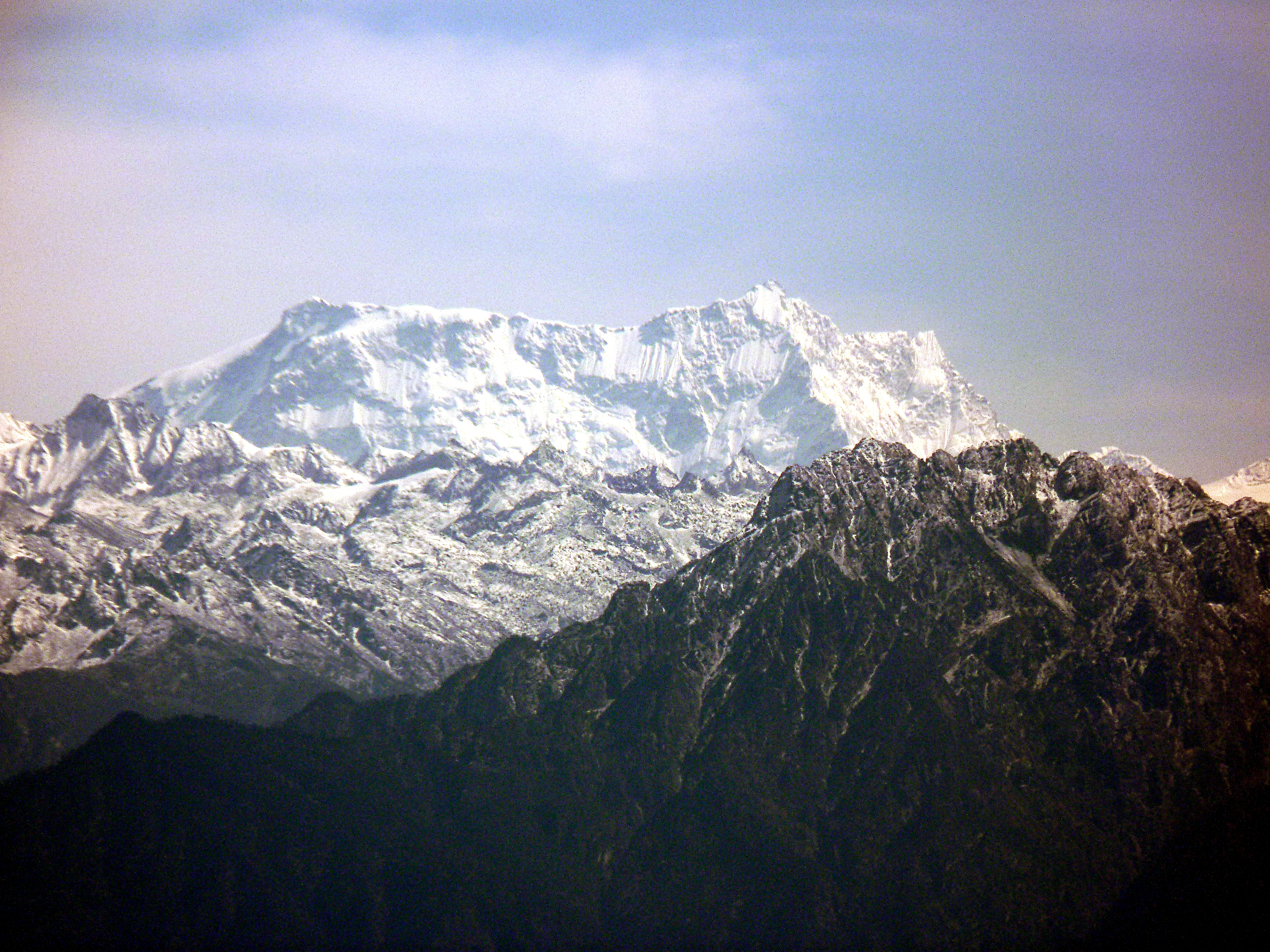
Gangkar Puensum, the highest peak in Bhutan as seen from the Dochula Pass

The pass is located at an elevation of 3,100 metres (10,200 ft) (3,140 metres (10,300 ft) and 3,150 metres (10,330 ft) are also mentioned) on the East West Road from Thimphu to Punakha amidst the Eastern Himalayan snow-covered mountains. To the northeast of the pass, the snow-clad mountain peaks of the Himalayas are seen prominently. Among them are Mt. Masanggang at 7,194 metres (23,602 ft) and Mt. Gangkar Puensum, which is the highest peak in Bhutan at an elevation of 7,570 metres (24,836 ft) and a prominence of 2,995 metres (9,826 ft). The road east of the pass runs steeply for some distance and then takes a left turn towards the Punakha Valley to the Punakha Dzong in Punakha (the old capital of Bhutan). Further east the road reaches Wangdue Phodrang, where there a seventh-century monastery on the ridge; that valley is drained by the Punatsangchu River. The pass was part of ancient trails or tracks between Thimphu and Punakha, some of which are now part of the Dochu La Nature Trail (1.2 kilometres (0.75 mi)), which begins at the Dochu La cafe and meets the present road at Lamperi, and the Lumitsawa Ancient Trail (4.7 kilometres (2.9 mi)), which joins the main road at Lumitsawa.

The weather at the pass generally remains foggy and chilly. However, between October and February, panoramic views of the Bhutanese Himalayas can be seen.

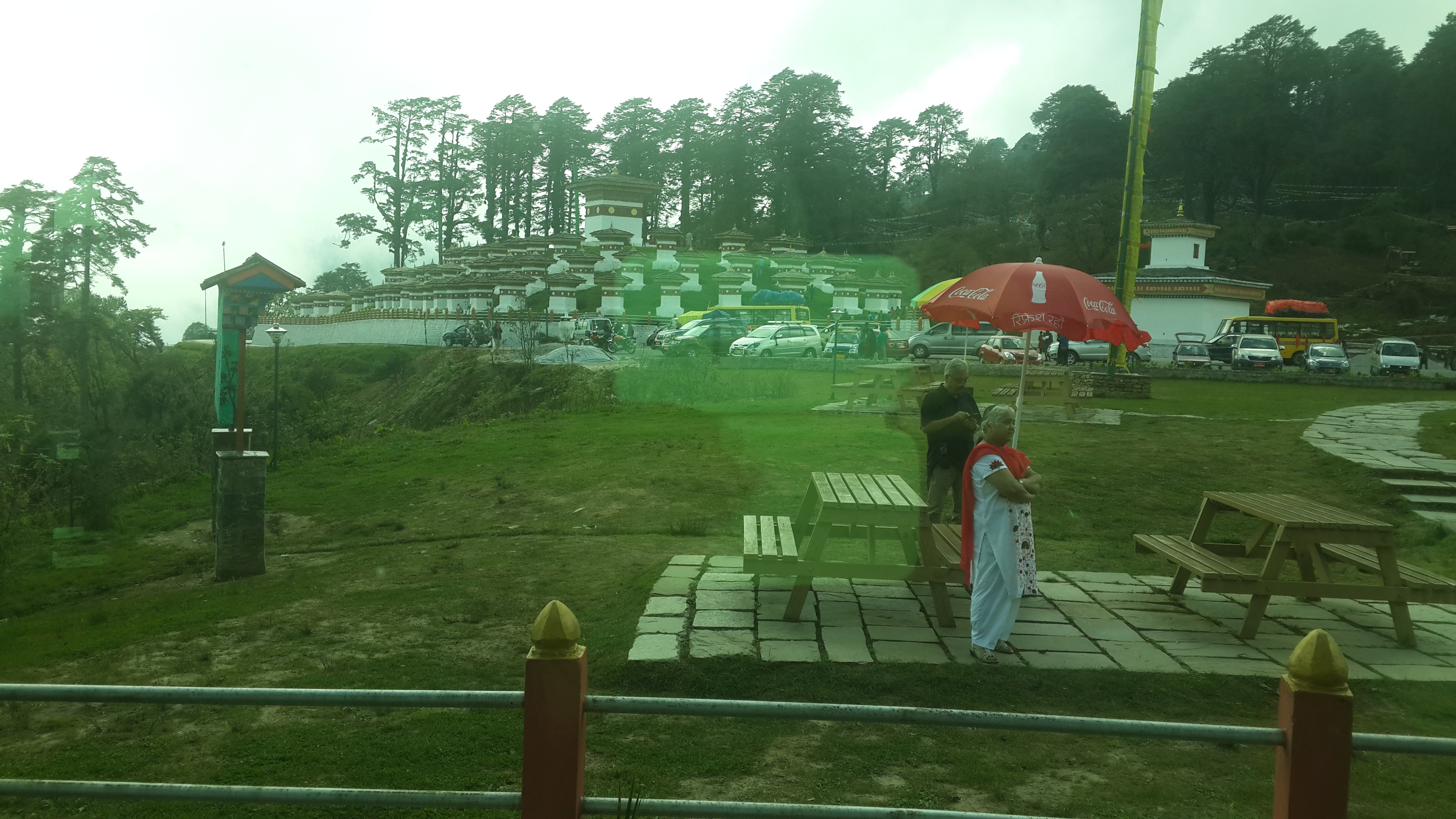
Vew of Dochula Pass in Bhutan, with forest in the background

The forest cover of the pass consists of Himalayan hemlock trees, with cypresses at lower elevations. The hill slopes around the pass are festooned with a profusion of colourful religious flags fixed by the Buddhist people as a mark of veneration. The flags, made in five colours representing the natural forces — blue for sky, white for clouds, red for fire, green for water and yellow for earth — are inscribed with Buddhist scriptural prayers to usher prosperity and peace around the country.

After the Losar festival in February, which marks the Bhutanese New Year, and as the snow melts, the pass provides a spectacle of many species of flowers, such as Primula denticulata, Primula bracteosa and, in the subsequent month, rhododendrons blooming in profusion. Magnolia campbellii also blooms on the pass during this period. Another fragrant plant is the Daphne, which is a small shrub which blooms with white flowers. The bark of this plant is used to make a traditional paper used for writing religious scriptures, as it is termite resistant.

== Landmarks ==
The landmarks around the pass include the 108 Druk Wangyal Khang Zhang Chortens (stupas), the Druk Wangyal Lhakhang (temple), and the rhododendron garden, which is part of the 47 km^{2} Royal Botanical Park.

=== Druk Wangyal Khang Zhang Chortens ===
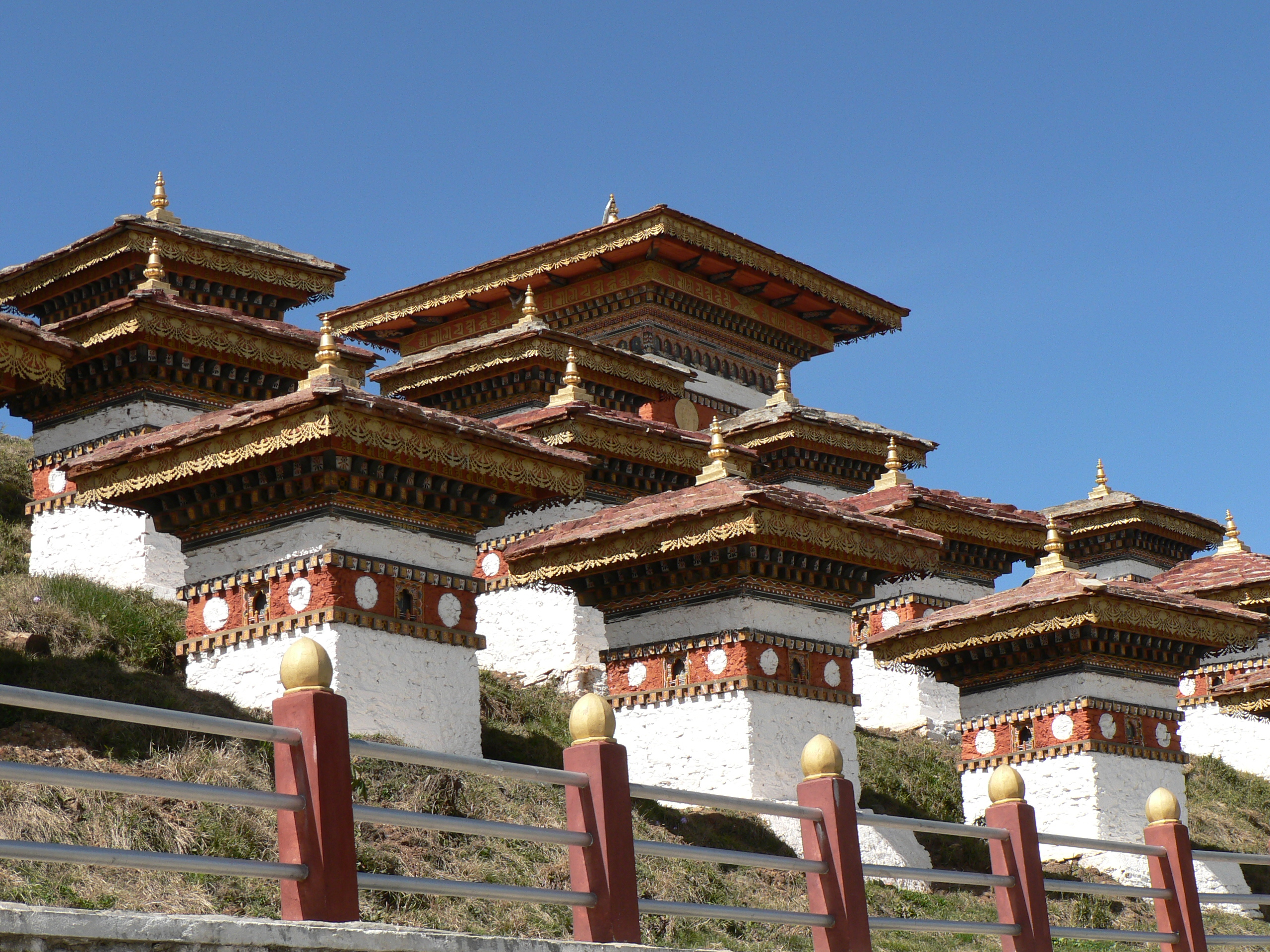
Full view of the chortens at the Dochu La Pass

The Druk Wangyal Khang Zhang Chortens are red-band or khangzang chortens, 108 in numbers, built on a central hillock at the pass, under the patronage of the Queen Ashi Dorji Wangmo Wangchuk. In the local language they are called the gYul Las rNampar Gyal wai' chortens, or chortens of victory. These were built as a memorial to the Bhutanese soldiers who were killed in the December 2003 battle against Assamese insurgents from India. They mark the victory of King Jigme Singye Wangchuck, who dislodged the rebels from their 30 camps in Bhutanese territory, from whence they were raiding Indian territory of Assam. The chortens were completed in mid-June 2004 and consecrated and sanctified with religious rites held on 19–20 June.

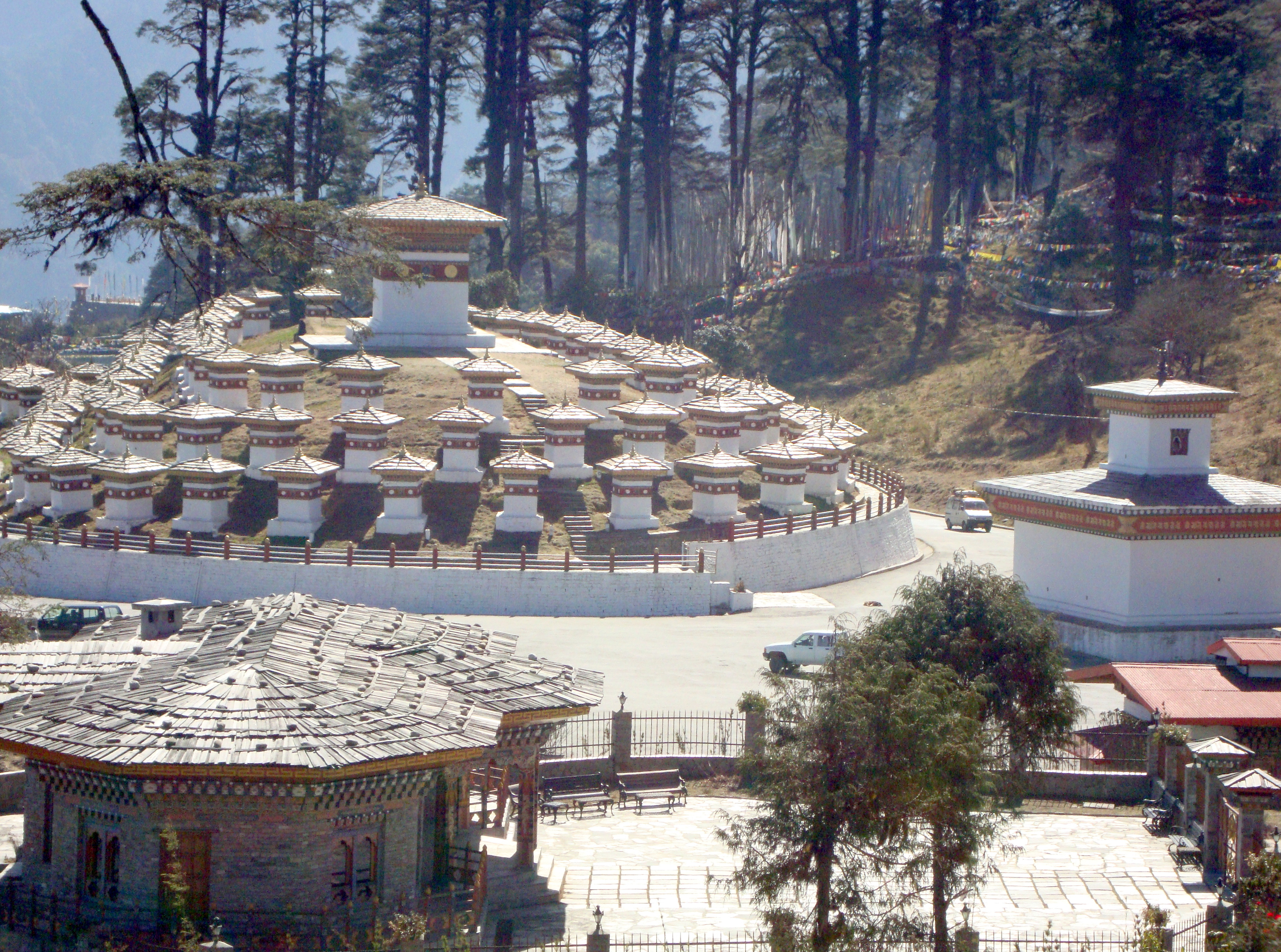
108 chortens in three layers at the Dochula Pass

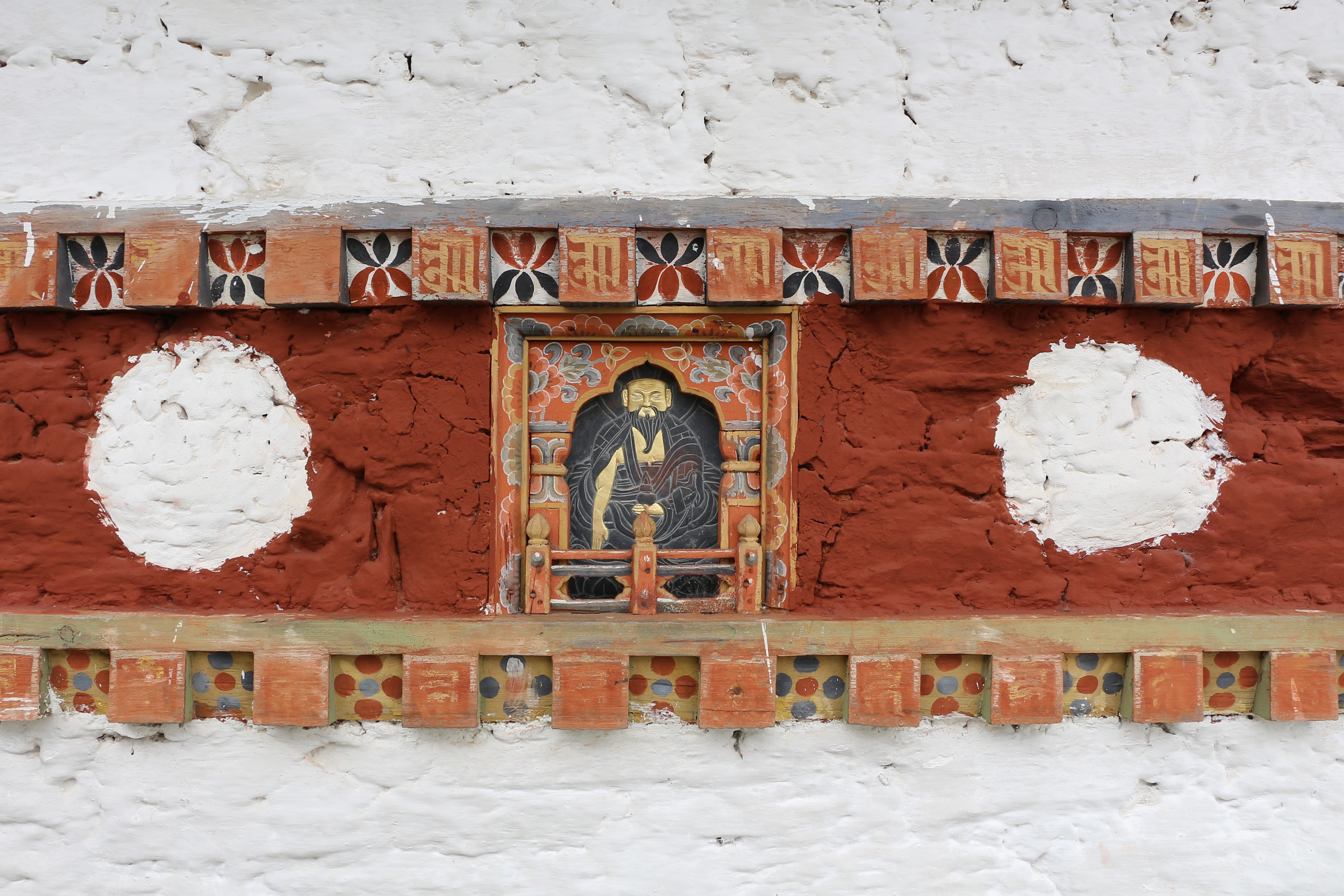
Detail of a chorten at Dochula Pass

The chortens are built in three layers. The lowest level layer has forty-five chortens, the second has thirty-six and the top layer has twenty-seven, all built around the main chorten. The construction of these chortens was done as per religiously ordained ritualistic procedures. As the height of the chortens attained 1 m a pit was excavated in ground in the centre, and symbolically offerings of grains and bronze utensil filled with butter were placed in the pit. At the next stage, as the height of chortens increased, images of Buddhist gods made of clay stuffed with papers inscribed with prayers were interred. In the next stage, which is considered the "vital stage" in erecting a chorten, the sokshing ("the life tree of the chorten") was fixed. The sokshing, which is believed to provide a link between heaven and earth within a chorten, is in the form of a long square wooden pole made from a juniper tree made by an individual who has appropriate qualities from an astrological point of view. The pole was painted red and inscribed with sacred hymns and banded with religious paraphernalia such as gilded images of gods, prayer bells, small clay stupas, and precious stones and jewellery. The sokshing was then wrapped around by silk cloth and then fixed in the partly built chorten on an auspicious day.

=== Druk Wangyal Lhakhang ===
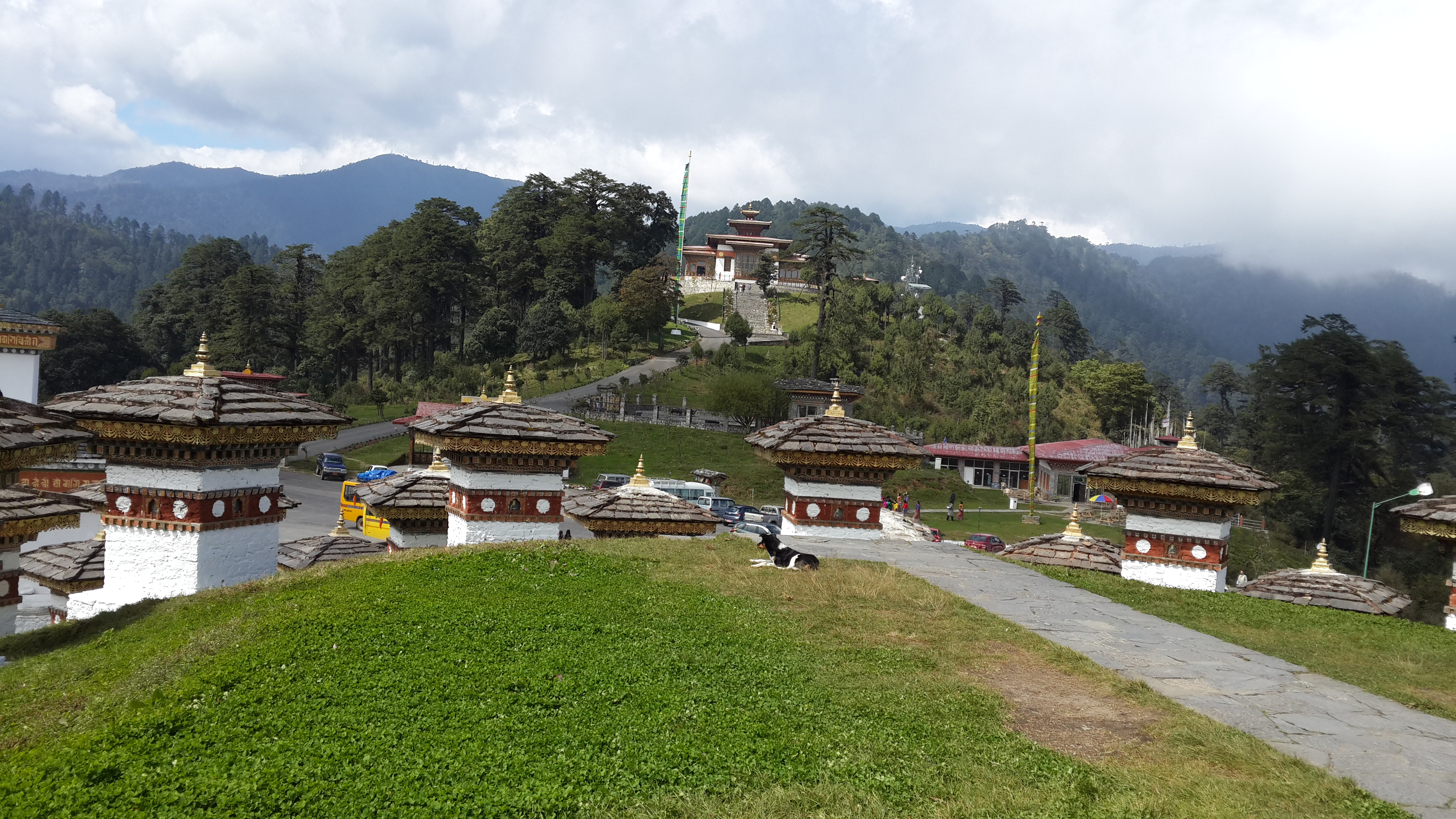
A close view of Dochula Pass with the Druk Wangyal Chortens with the monastery called the Druk Wangyal Lhakhang at the far end

After completion of the chortens, construction of a temple known as the Druk Wangyel Lhakhng was initiated and completed in June 2008. This was built to celebrate 100 years of monarchy in Bhutan. Paintings on themes of Bhutanese history decorate the walls of the temple. Some of the murals are cartoonish. A few of the paintings relate to the fourth king fighting Indian rebels in the forest, monks with laptop, and a Druk Air plane. It appears like a "Bhutanese fusion of the 21st and 15th centuries".

=== Dochu La Wangyal Festival ===
The Dochula Druk Wangyel Tsechu (festival) is held annually on December 13, at the Druk Wangyel Festival ground. This festival was established in 2011 to commemorate the victory of the Fourth Druk Gyalpo and the Armed Forces in 2003. A special tsechu was composed for the occasion by Dasho Karma Ura and involves costumed mask dances.

== Bibliography ==
- Bisht, Ramesh Chandra (2008). International Encyclopaedia of Himalayas. Mittal Publications. ISBN 978-81-8324-265-3.
- Rennie, Frank; Mason, Robin (2008). Bhutan: Ways of Knowing. IAP. ISBN 978-1-59311-734-4.
- Ura, Karma (2011). Dochula Druk Wangyel Festival.
