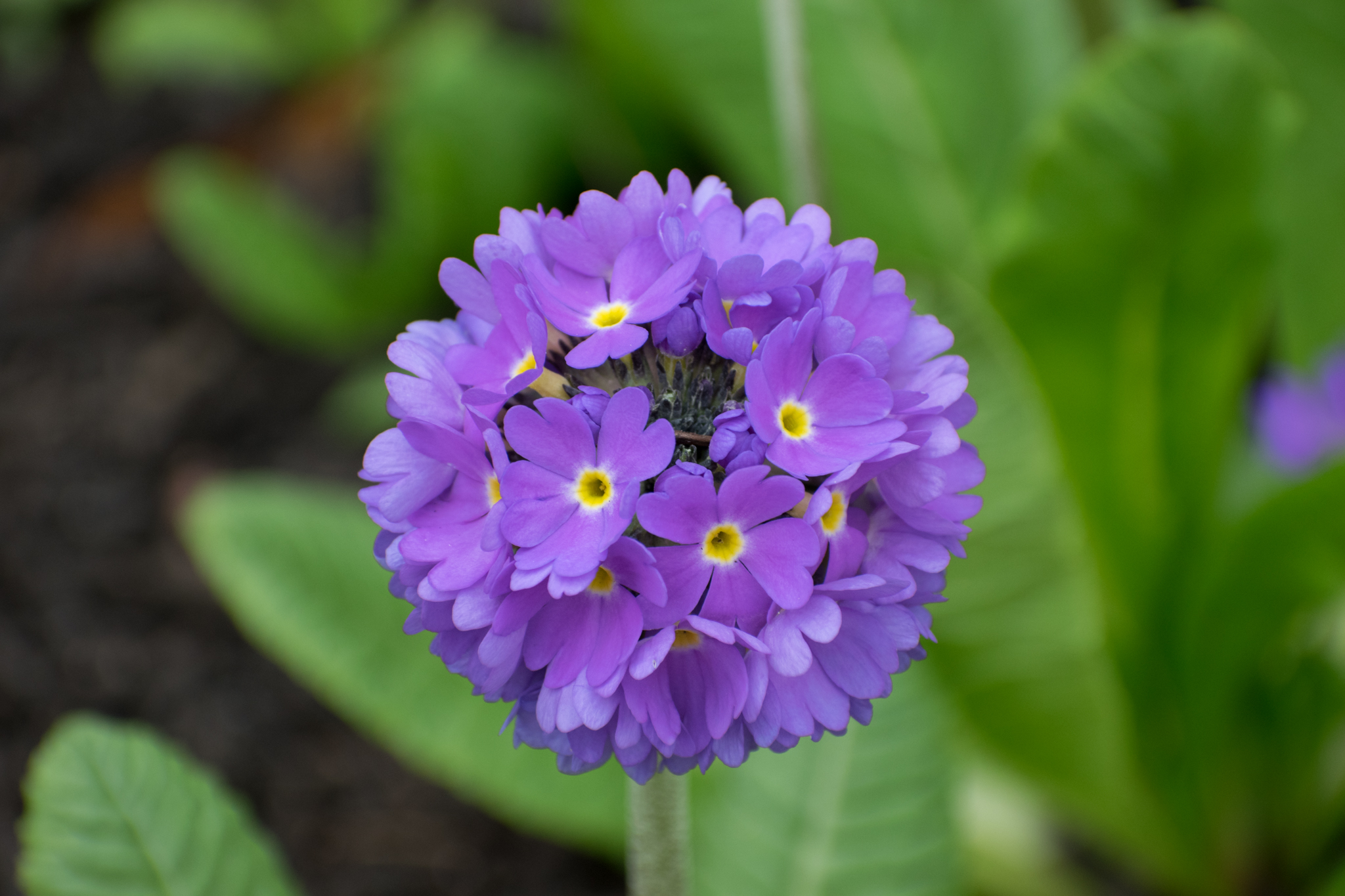

Scientific classification
- Kingdom: Plantae
- Clade: Tracheophytes
- Clade: Angiosperms
- Clade: Eudicots
- Clade: Asterids
- Order: Ericales
- Family: Primulaceae
- Genus: Primula
- Species: P. denticulata

Binomial name
- Primula denticulata Sm.

= Primula denticulata =

Species of flowering plant

Primula denticulata, the drumstick primula, is a species of flowering plant in the family Primulaceae, native to moist alpine regions of China (S Xizang), Afghanistan, Bhutan, India, N Myanmar, Nepal, and Pakistan. It is an herbaceous perennial growing to 45 cm (18 in) tall and wide, with rosettes of oval leaves and sturdy stems bearing spherical umbels of purple flowers in late spring and early summer. Flowers can also be lavender, pink, or white in colour. The specific epithet denticulata means "small-toothed", referring to the serrated leaf edges. The plant's common name, drumstick primula, refers to the spherical shape of the inflorescence, above an erect stem.

A popular garden subject for deep moist soil in sun or partial shade, P. denticulata and its cultivars can be grown from seed. It has gained the Royal Horticultural Society's Award of Garden Merit.

== Toxicity ==
Primula denticulata is known to contain the contact allergens primin and other quinoid compounds.

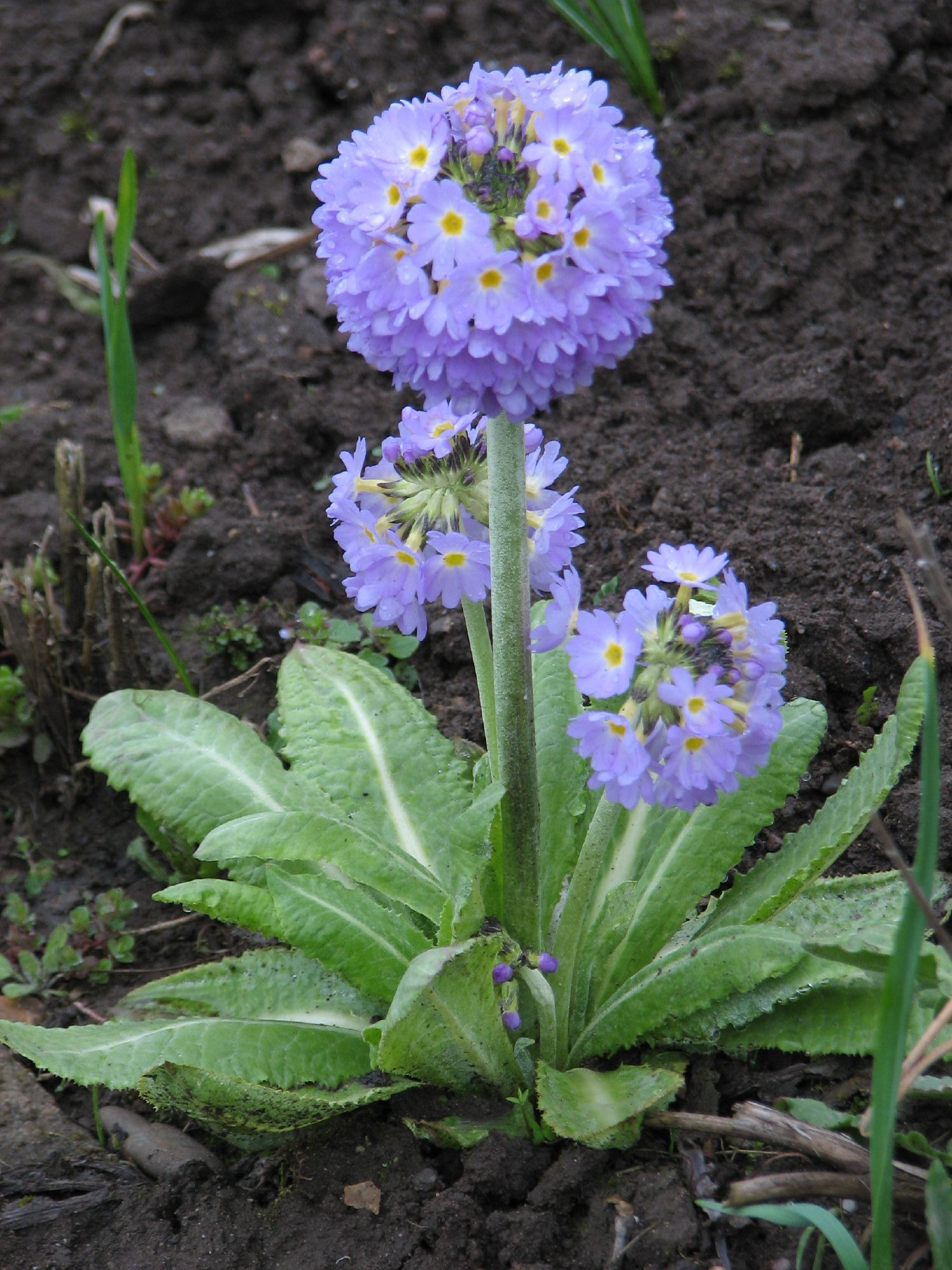

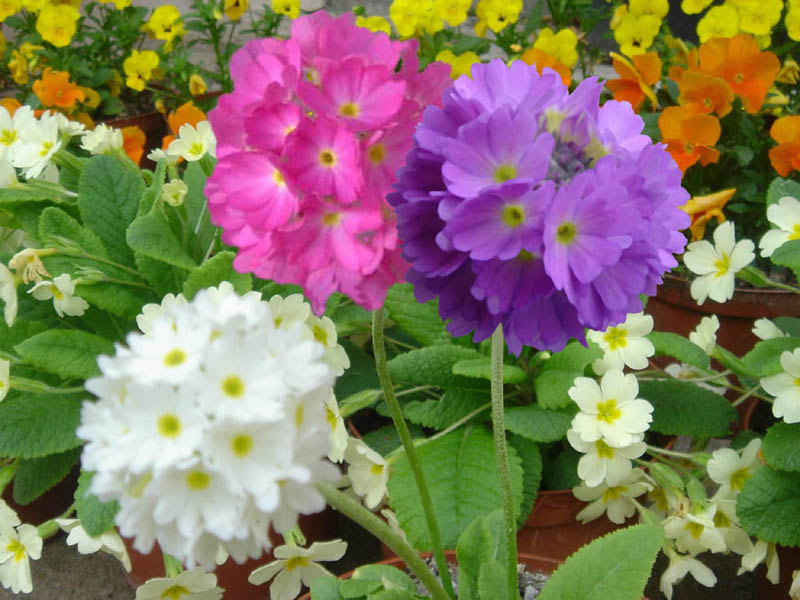
Colour forms
