= Atiśa =

Scholar of Madhyamaka Buddhism (982–1054)

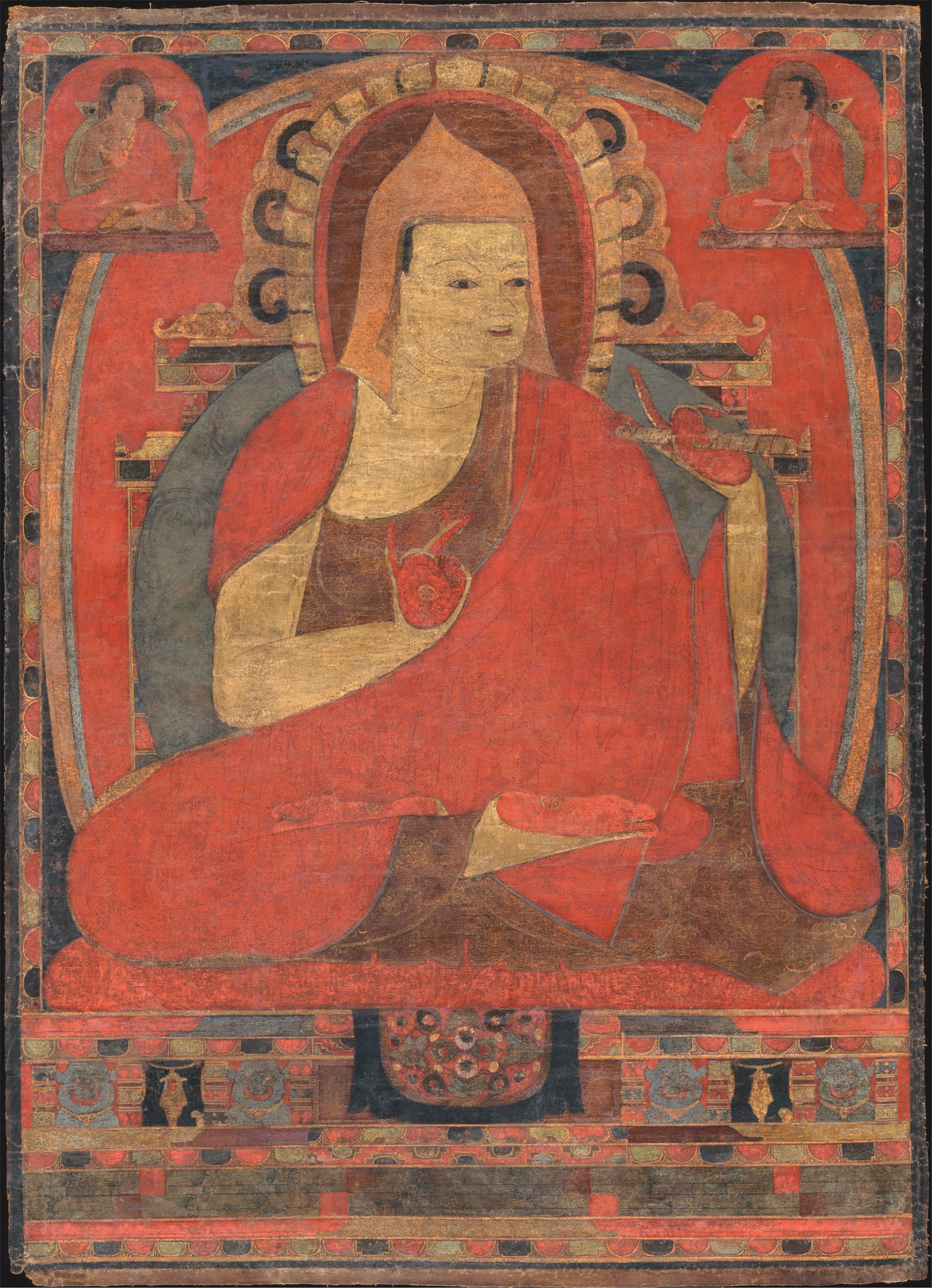
- In this twelfth-century Tibetan depiction, Atiśa holds a long, thin palm-leaf manuscript with his left hand and making the gesture of teaching with his right hand. Produced in a Kadam monastery in Tibet, currently held in the Metropolitan Museum of Art.

Personal life
- Born: c. 982 CE Vikrampura, Bengal
- Died: c. 1054 CE Nyêtang, Tibet
- Education: Vikramashila; Odantapuri

Religious life
- Religion: Buddhism
- Dharma name: Atiśa

Senior posting
- Teacher: Jñanasrimitra
- Students: Dromtön

Atiśa Dīpaṃkara Śrījñāna (c. 982–1054 CE) was a Buddhist religious teacher and leader from Bengal. He is generally associated with his body of work authored at Vikramaśīla Monastery in Bihar. He was a major figure in the spread of 11th-century Mahayana and Vajrayana Buddhism in Asia and travelled to Sumatra and Tibet. Atiśa, along with his chief disciple Dromtön, is regarded as the founder of the Kadam school, one of the New Translation schools of Tibetan Buddhism. In the 14th century, the Kadam school was supplanted by the Gelug tradition, which adopted its teachings and absorbed its monasteries.

== Biography ==
=== Early life ===
Atiśa was born as Candragarbha in c. 982 CE as the second of three sons to a ruling family in Bengal most probably in the village of Vajrayogini in Vikrampura, the latter was one of the capitals of the Pala Empire. His father was a king known as Kalyānaśrī and his mother was Prabhavati Sri. The early part of his life was typical of noblemen of the period, and he was trained in various fields, including art.

=== Studies ===
As a young man, he began to study tantra in what is now Rajgir, where he was tutored by a monk named Rāhulaguhyavajra. Under Rāhulaguhyavajra, Atiśa was initiated into Hevajra and taught specific meditations. He then studied for seven years under a master named Avadhūtipā, where he focused on yoga and engaged in tantric feasts known as ganachakra.

According to Tibetan sources, Atiśa was ordained into the Mahāsāṃghika lineage at the age of twenty-eight by the Abbot Śīlarakṣita in Bodh Gaya and studied almost all Buddhist and non-Buddhist schools of his time, including teachings from Vaishnavism, Shaivism, Tantric Hinduism and other practices. He also studied the sixty-four kinds of art, the art of music and the art of logic and accomplished these studies until the age of twenty-two. Among the many Buddhist lineages he studied, practiced, and transmitted, the three main lineages were the Lineage of the Profound Action transmitted by Asaṅga and Vasubandhu, the Lineage of Profound View transmitted by Nagarjuna and Candrakīrti, and the Lineage of Profound Experience transmitted by Tilopa and Naropa. Atiśa engaged with many notable teachers during this period, including Ratnākaraśānti, Naropa and Jitari. He also studied Dharmarakṣita at the monastery of Odantapuri.

=== Vikramaśīla ===
Atiśa rose to become a senior scholar at the monastery of Vikramaśīla at a time when it had no more than one hundred ordained monks present. Tibetan hagiographies on his life have a tendency to portray him as one of the greatest scholars to stay at Vikramaśīla, who would be noted for his strict adherence to the ethics of Mahayana Buddhism. It was during this period that the King of the Tibetan polity of Guge, Lha bla ma Ye shes 'od began to send missions to Vikramaśīla to invite scholars to visit Guge so that they could teach the "pure form of Buddhism".

Atiśa finally departed Vikramaśīla in 1040 CE. The then abbot of Vikramaśīla, Ratnakara, gave his permission for Atiśa to leave but on the condition that he return in three years.

=== Teachings in Sumatra and Tibet ===
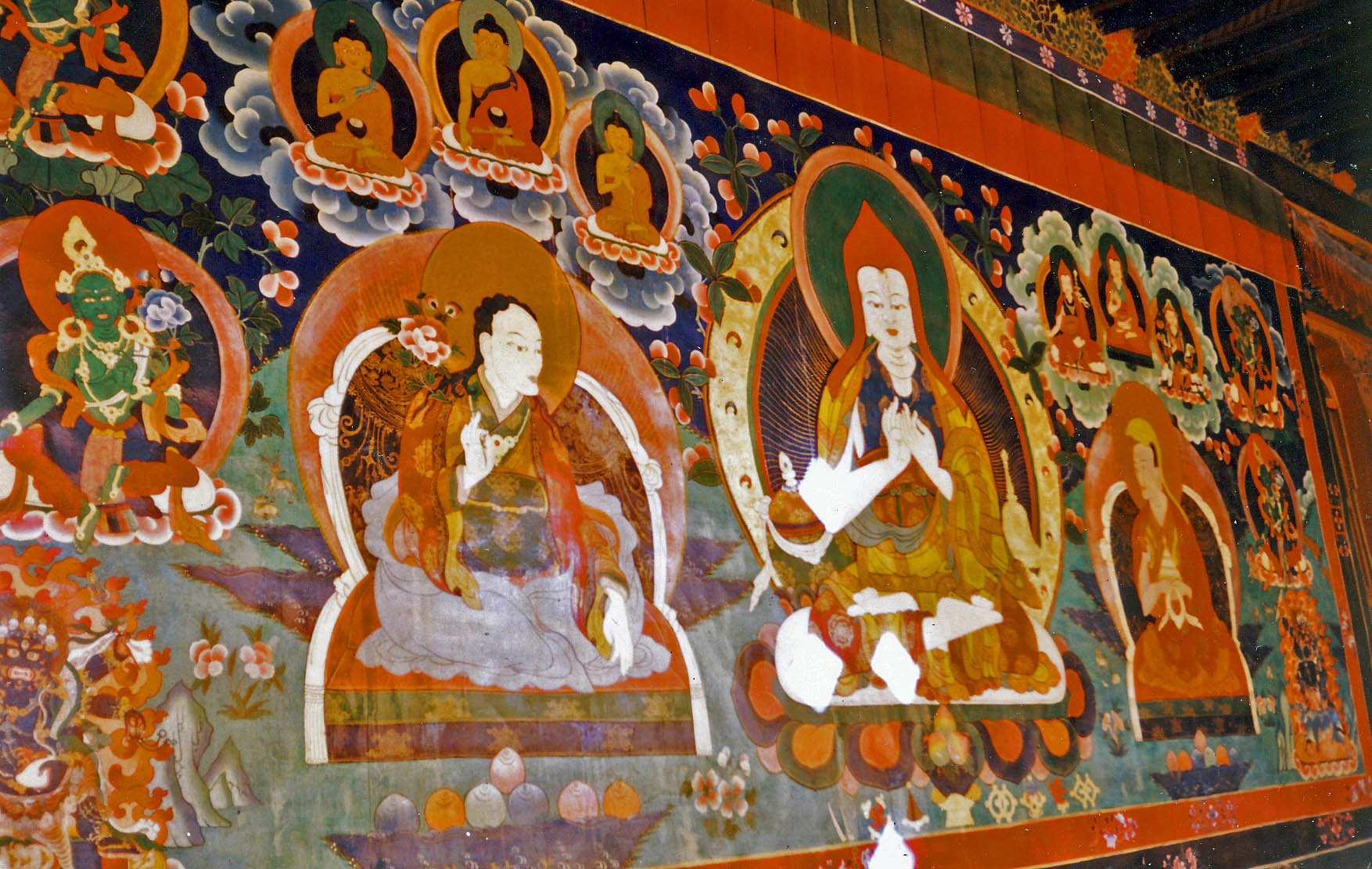
Mural of Atiśa at Ralung Monastery, 1993.

Tibetan sources record that Atiśa spent 12 years in Sumatra of the Srivijaya empire, and he returned to India in 1025 CE which was also the same year when Rajendra Chola I of the Chola dynasty invaded Sumatra.

Upon his return, he received much attention for his teachings and skills in debate and philosophy. On three separate occasions, Atiśa was acclaimed for defeating non-Buddhist extremists in debate. When he came into contact with what he perceived to be a misled or deteriorating form of Buddhism, he would quickly and effectively implement reforms. Soon enough he was appointed to the position of steward, or abbot, at Vikramaśīla which was established by Emperor Dharmapala. He is also said to have "nourished" Odantapuri.

Atiśa's return from Suvarnabhumi, where he had been studying with Dharmakīrtiśrī, and his rise to prominence in India coincided with a flourishing of Buddhist culture and the practice of Buddhism in the region, and in many ways Atiśa's influence contributed to these developments. According to the Blue Annals, a new king of Guge by the name of Yeshe-Ö sent his academic followers to learn and translate some of the Sanskrit Buddhist texts. Among these academics was Naktso, who was eventually sent to Vikramaśīla to study Sanskrit and plead with Atiśa to come teach the Dharma in his homeland.

Travelling with Naktso and Gya Lōtsawa, Atiśa journeyed through Nepal on his way to Tolung, the capital of the Purang Kingdom. (Gya Lōtsawa died before reaching Tolung.) On his way, he is said to have met Marpa Lōtsawa. He spent three years in Tolung and compiled his teachings into his most influential scholarly work, Bodhipathapradīpa, or Lamp for the Path to Enlightenment. This short text in sixty-seven verses lays out the entire Buddhist path in terms of the three vehicles: Hīnayāna, Mahāyāna, and Vajrayāna, and became the model for subsequent texts in the genre of Lamrim, or the Stages of the Path, and was specifically the basis for Tsongkhapa's Lamrim writings. Here Atiśa met Dromtön, or Dromtonpa, who would become his primary disciple, regarded as both an enforcer of later propagation ethical standards and a holder of Atiśa's tantric lineage.

According to Jamgon Kongtrul, when Atiśa discovered the store of Sanskrit texts at Pekar Kordzoling, the library of Samye, "he said that the degree to which the Vajrayana had spread in Tibet was unparalleled, even in India. After saying this, he reverently folded his hands and praised the great dharma kings, translators, and panditas of the previous centuries."

== Legacy ==
In 2004, Atiśa was ranked 18th in the BBC's poll of the greatest Bengalis of all time.

== Writings ==
His writings include:

- Bodhipathapradīpa (Wylie: byang chub lam gyi sgron ma)
- Bodhipathapradipapanjikanama (his own commentary on Bodhipathapradīpa / byang chub lam gyi sgron ma)
- Charyasamgrahapradipa contains some kirtan verses composed by Atiśa.
- Satyadvayavatara
- Bodhisattvamanyavali
- Madhyamakaratnapradipa
- Mahayanapathasadhanasangraha
- Shiksasamuccaya Abhisamya
- Prajnaparamitapindarthapradipa
- Ekavirasadhana
- Vimalaratnalekha, a Sanskrit letter to Nayapala, king of Gauda.

== See also ==
- Nyethang Drolma Temple
- Bikrampur Vihara
