= Nyethang Drolma Temple =

Tibetan Buddhist temple in Nyêtang, Tibet, China

- Tibetan transcription(s); Tibetan: སྙེ་ཐང་སྒྲོལ་མ་ལྷ་ཁང་ Wylie transliteration: snye thang sgrol ma lha khang THL: Nyétang Drölma Lhakhang; Chinese transcription(s); Simplified: 聶塘卓瑪拉康; Pinyin: Niètáng Zhuómǎ Lākāng
- Location within the Tibet Autonomous Region, China

Religion
- Affiliation: Tibetan Buddhism
- Sect: Gelug

Location
- Location: Nyêtang, Qüxü County, Lhasa, Tibet Autonomous Region, China
- Country: China
- Interactive map of Nyethang Drolma Temple
- Coordinates: 29.529446°N 90.949693°E

Architecture
- Founder: Atiśa, Dromtön
- Established: Song dynasty

The Nyethang Drolma Temple (Wylie: snye thang sgrol ma lha khang) is a temple in Nyêtang in the Tibet Autonomous Region of China dedicated to Tara. It is associated with Atiśa (980–1054), who founded the Kadam school of Tibetan Buddhism. The monastery survived the Cultural Revolution relatively undamaged. It is dedicated to Tara, a female bodhisattva, and contains many statues and paintings of Tara.

== Location ==
The Nyethang Drolma Temple is southwest of Lhasa on the Qüshü–Nepal Highway 36 kilometres (22 mi) from the county seat and 33 kilometres (21 mi) from Lhasa. It is in Nyétang, Qüxü County. It is easily accessible from Lhasa and many pilgrims visit it. In 2012, the temple had 25 monks. Another source states there are just seven Gelug monks.

== History ==
Atiśa taught the Four Tantras to physicians in the monastery, and later died there. Some sources say that Atiśa built the monastery, which was expanded after his death by his pupil Dromtön. Another version says that Dromtön raised funds to build the temple to commemorate his old friend. In 1057 Dromtön brought Atisha's body from Nyethang to Reting Monastery, and placed his remains in a stupa built by an Indian artist.

The monastery survived the Cultural Revolution without much damage, and was able to preserve most of its valuable artifacts, due to the intervention of Premier Zhou Enlai at the request of the government of what is now Bangladesh. The main hall was rebuilt in the 1990s. In March 2010, a project began to restore the southern hall, which had deteriorated in the 1980s due to poor maintenance. 900,000 yuan were allocated for the job.

== Description ==
The small two-story temple is a good example of 11th century Tibetan temple architecture. The temple has a long, open porch with regularly-spaced symmetrical windows. The Dalai Lama used the second floor as a residence; he often came to visit and worship. This floor today has a library and some meditation rooms. In the interior there are three small chapels. The south hall of the temple is the Coffin Tower Hall of Atiśa. It has a floor area of 359 square metres (3,860 sq ft).

The temple has many statues and paintings of Tara, a famous female bodhisattva. The depictions of Tara are colored in natural pigments of white, blue, green and red. In the sutra-chanting chapel, there are 21 life-size bronze statues of Tara. The main statue is of Gautama Buddha with a small statue of Atiśa to the left. There is a relic from Naropa at this site as well.

Hugh Edward Richardson photographed a figure of Atiśa in ceremonial dress enthroned in a shrine in one of the temples. Steps led to the throne, and there were five bowls of water offerings on the topmost one. There was a gilded roof immediately above the figure's head above which was a ceremonial umbrella. Other preserved artifacts include two clay statues of the Four Heavenly Kings, a stone grinder that Yuthog Yontan Gonpo used in making medicines and stacks of old manuscripts that make up the Kangyur section of the Tibetan Buddhist canon.

== Sources ==
- Buckley, Michael (2012). Tibet. Bradt Travel Guides. ISBN 978-1-84162-382-5.
- "Chinese Buddhist temple tour: Lhasa Nie Tong Temple (Dolma Lacan)" (in Chinese). 2007-10-17.
- "Drolma Lhakhang Temple". Bamboo Compass.
- "Drolma Lhakhang". Tibet Guru.
- Fenton, Peter (1999-10-01). Tibetan Healing: The Modern Legacy of Medicine Buddha. Quest Books Theosophical Publishing House. ISBN 978-0-8356-0776-6.
- "Figure of Atisha in a temple at Nyethang". The Tibet Album. The Pitt Rivers Museum. 2006-12-05.
- Kossak, Steven; Bruce-Gardner, Robert (1998-01-01). Sacred Visions: Early Paintings from Central Tibet. Metropolitan Museum of Art. ISBN 978-0-87099-862-1.
- "Nie Tong Temple". China Tibet Online. 2005-07-04.
- "Renovation of Drolma Lhakhang Temple to begin in March". Xinhua News Agency. 2010-02-13. Archived from the original on February 21, 2010.
- "TBRC Resource ID: G4605". Tibetan Buddhist Resource Center.

== Literature ==
- von Schroeder, Ulrich. 2001. Buddhist Sculptures in Tibet. Vol. One: India & Nepal; Vol. Two: Tibet & China. (Volume One: 655 pages with 766 illustrations; Volume Two: 675 pages with 987 illustrations). Hong Kong: Visual Dharma Publications, Ltd. ISBN 962-7049-07-7. sNye thang («nyetang») monastery, pp. 220–223, 365, 440, 551, 860–869, 1034, 1128, 1129; Figs. III–4–7, XIII–34A–34B; sGrol ma lha khang («dölma lhakhang»), pp. 220, 440, 860–862, 1034, 1164–1167; Fig. XIII–34A; Pls. 108A, 108B, 309C, 310A, 310B, 310C, 310D, 310E; rNam rgyal lha khang («namgyal lhakhang»), pp. 365, 860, 1128, 1162–1164; Pls. 308A, 308B, 308C, 308D, 308E, 309A, 309B; gNas brtan lha khang («neden lhakhang»), p. 221; Figs. III–4–5; Tshe dpag med lha khang («tsepagme lhakhang»), pp. 860–869; Pls. 199–200.
