= Nyêtang Township =

Nyêtang
- Township
- མཉེས་ཐང་

Tibetan transcription(s)
  - Tibetan: མཉེས་ཐང་

Chinese transcription(s)
- Location within Tibet
- Coordinates: 29°33′14″N 90°57′56″E
- Country: China
- Province: Tibet Autonomous Region
- Prefecture: Lhasa Prefecture
- County: Qüxü County
- Time zone: UTC+8 (CST)

Nyêtang (Tibetan: མཉེས་ཐང་) is a village in Qüxü County in the Lhasa Prefecture in the Tibet Autonomous Region of China. It is located approximately 12 miles south-west of Lhasa.

== See also ==
- List of towns and villages in Tibet
- Nyethang Drolma Lhakhang Temple
