= Mind in Eastern philosophy =

Branch of philosophy on the nature of the mind

The study of the mind in Eastern philosophy has parallels to the Western study of the philosophy of mind as a branch of philosophy that studies the nature of the mind. Dualism and monism are the two central schools of thought on the mind–body problem in the Western tradition, although nuanced views have arisen that do not fit one or the other category neatly. Dualism is found in both Eastern and Western traditions (in the Sankhya and Yoga schools of Hindu philosophy as well as Plato) but its entry into Western philosophy was thanks to René Descartes in the 17th century. This article on mind in eastern philosophy deals with this subject from the standpoint of eastern philosophy which is historically strongly separated from the Western tradition and its approach to the Western philosophy of mind.

== Mind in Hindu philosophy ==
=== Dualism ===
Substance Dualism is a common feature of several orthodox Hindu schools including the Sāṅkhya, Nyāya, Yoga and Dvaita Vedanta. In these schools a clear difference is drawn between matter and a non-material soul, which is eternal and undergoes samsara, a cycle of death and rebirth. The Nyāya school argued that qualities such as cognition and desire are inherent qualities which are not possessed by anything solely material, and therefore by process of elimination must belong to a non-material self, the atman. Many of these schools see their spiritual goal as moksha, liberation from the cycle of reincarnation.

=== Vedanta monistic idealism ===
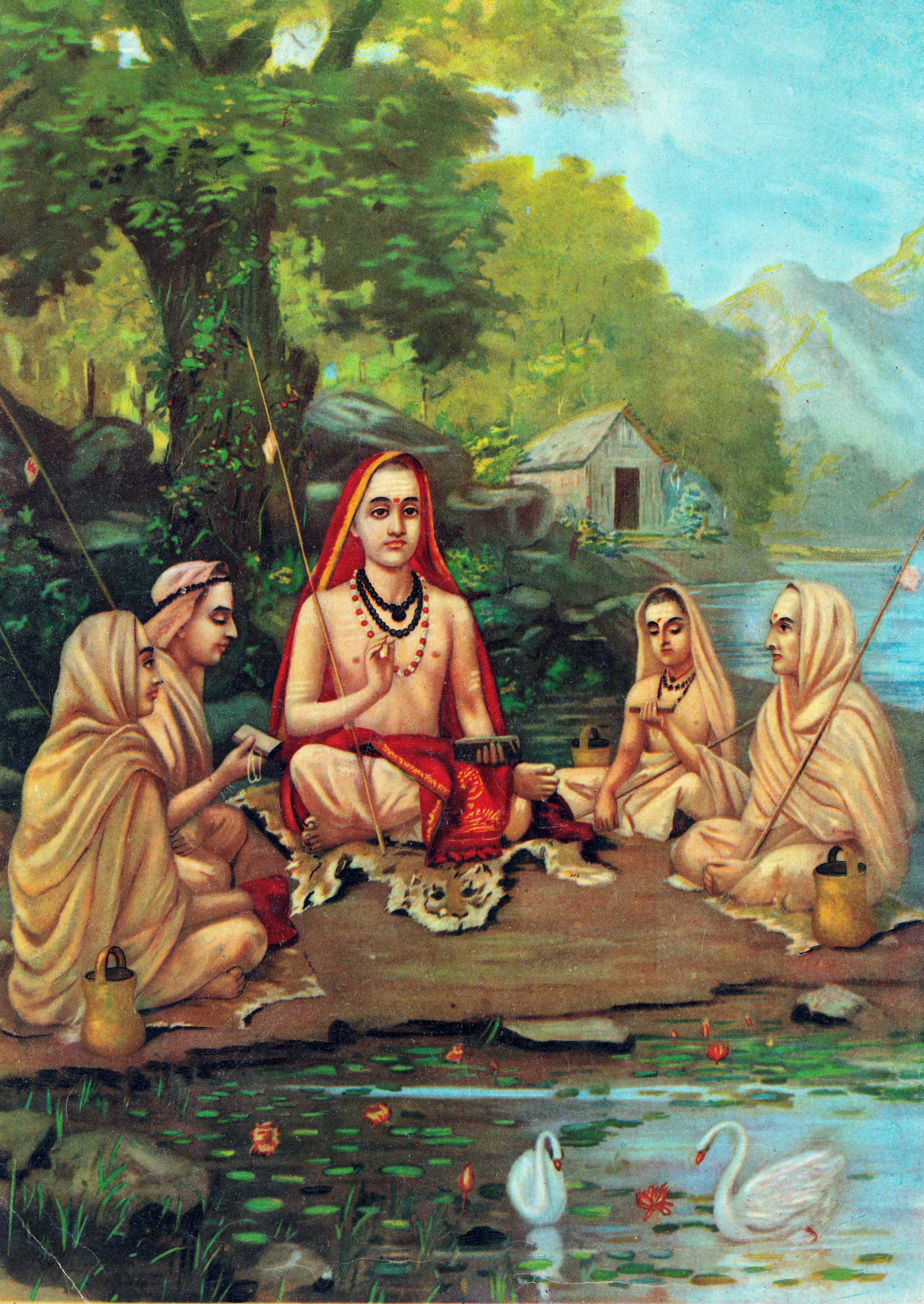
Śaṅkara

In the Advaita Vedanta of the 8th century Indian philosopher Śaṅkara, the mind, body and world are all held to be appearances of the same unchanging eternal conscious entity called Brahman. Advaita, which means non-dualism, holds the view that all that exists is pure absolute consciousness. The fact that the world seems to be made up of changing entities is an illusion, or Maya. The only thing that exists is Brahman, which is described as Satchitananda (Being, consciousness and bliss). Advaita Vedanta is best described by a verse which states "Brahman is alone True, and this world of plurality is an error; the individual self is not different from Brahman."

Another form of monistic Vedanta is Vishishtadvaita (qualified non-dualism) as posited by the eleventh century philosopher Ramanuja. Ramanuja criticized Advaita Vedanta by arguing that consciousness is always intentional and that it is also always a property of something. Ramanuja's Brahman is defined by a multiplicity of qualities and properties in a single monistic entity. This doctrine is called "sāmānādhikaraṇya" (several things in a common substrate).

=== Materialism ===
Arguably the first exposition of empirical materialism in the history of philosophy is in the Cārvāka school (also called Lokāyata). The Cārvāka school rejected the existence of anything but matter (which they defined as being made up of the four elements), including God and the soul. Therefore, they held that even consciousness was nothing but a construct made up of atoms. A section of the Cārvāka school believed in a material soul made up of air or breath, but since this also was a form of matter, it was not said to survive death.

== Buddhist philosophy of mind ==
The Five Aggregates (pañcakkhandha)
according to the Pali Canon.

form (rūpa)
4 elements (mahābhūta)
	↓
	contact (phassa)
↓	↑
consciousness (viññāna)

→
←

←

mental factors (cetasika)
feeling (vedanā)
perception (sañña)
formation (saṅkhāra)

- Form is derived from the Four Great Elements.
- Consciousness arises from other aggregates.
- Mental Factors arise from the Contact of
  Consciousness and other aggregates.
- The five aggregates are no-self.

Source: MN 109 (Thanissaro, 2001) | diagram details

Buddhist teachings describe that the mind manifests moment-to-moment as sense impressions and mental phenomena that are continuously changing. The moment-by-moment manifestation of the mind-stream has been described as happening in every person all the time, even in a scientist who analyses various phenomena in the world, or analyses the material body including the organ brain. The manifestation of the mind-stream is also described as being influenced by physical laws, biological laws, psychological laws, volitional laws, and universal laws.

A salient feature of Buddhist philosophy which sets it apart from Indian orthodoxy is the centrality of the doctrine of not-self (Pāli. anatta, Skt. anātman). The Buddha's not-self doctrine sees humans as an impermanent composite of five psychological and physical aspects instead of a single fixed self. In this sense, what is called ego or the self is merely a convenient fiction, an illusion that does not apply to anything real but to an erroneous way of looking at the ever-changing stream of five interconnected aggregate factors. The relationship between these aggregates is said to be one of dependent-arising (pratītyasamutpāda). This means that all things, including mental events, arise co-dependently from a plurality of other causes and conditions. This seems to reject both causal determinist and epiphenomenalist conceptions of mind.

=== Abhidharma theories of mind ===
Three centuries after the death of the Buddha (c. 150 BCE) saw the growth of a large body of literature called the Abhidharma in several contending Buddhist schools. In the Abhidharmic analysis of mind, the ordinary thought is defined as prapañca ('conceptual proliferation'). According to this theory, perceptual experience is bound up in multiple conceptualizations (expectations, judgments and desires). This proliferation of conceptualizations form our illusory superimposition of concepts like self and other upon an ever-changing stream of aggregate phenomena. In this conception of mind no strict distinction is made between the conscious faculty and the actual sense perception of various phenomena. Consciousness is instead said to be divided into six sense modalities, five for the five senses and sixth for perception of mental phenomena. The arising of cognitive awareness is said to depend on sense perception, awareness of the mental faculty itself which is termed mental or 'introspective awareness' (manovijñāna) and attention (āvartana), the picking out of objects out of the constantly changing stream of sensory impressions.

Rejection of a permanent agent eventually led to the philosophical problems of the seeming continuity of mind and also of explaining how rebirth and karma continue to be relevant doctrines without an eternal mind. This challenge was met by the Theravāda school by introducing the concept of mind as a factor of existence. This "life-stream" (Bhavanga-sota) is an undercurrent forming the condition of being. The continuity of a karmic "person" is therefore assured in the form of a mindstream (citta-santana), a series of flowing mental moments arising from the subliminal life-continuum mind (Bhavanga-citta), mental content, and attention.

=== Indian Mahayana ===
The Sautrāntika school held a form of phenomenalism that saw the world as imperceptible. It held that external objects exist only as a support for cognition, which can only apprehend mental representations. This influenced the later Yogācāra school of Mahayana Buddhism. The Yogācāra school is often called the mind-only school because of its internalist stance that consciousness is the ultimate existing reality. The works of Vasubandhu have often been interpreted as arguing for some form of Idealism. Vasubandhu uses the dream argument and a mereological refutation of atomism to attack the reality of external objects as anything other than mental entities. Scholarly interpretations of Vasubandhu's philosophy vary widely, and include phenomenalism, neutral monism and realist phenomenology.

The Indian Mahayana schools were divided on the issue of the possibility of reflexive awareness (svasaṃvedana). Dharmakīrti accepted the idea of reflexive awareness as expounded by the Yogācāra school, comparing it to a lamp that illuminates itself while also illuminating other objects. This was strictly rejected by Mādhyamika scholars like Candrakīrti. Since in the philosophy of the Mādhyamika all things and mental events are characterized by emptiness, they argued that consciousness could not be an inherently reflexive ultimate reality since that would mean it was self-validating and therefore not characterized by emptiness. These views were ultimately reconciled by the 8th century thinker Śāntarakṣita. In Śāntarakṣita's synthesis he adopts the idealist Yogācāra views of reflexive awareness as a conventional truth into the structure of the two truths doctrine. Thus he states: "By relying on the Mind-Only system, know that external entities do not exist. And by relying on this Middle Way system, know that no self exists at all, even in that [mind]."

The Yogācāra school also developed the theory of the repository consciousness (ālayavijñāna) to explain continuity of mind in rebirth and accumulation of karma. This repository consciousness acts as a storehouse for karmic seeds (bija) when all other senses are absent during the process of death and rebirth as well as being the causal potentiality of dharmic phenomena. Thus according to B. Alan Wallace:

No constituents of the body—in the brain or elsewhere—transform into mental states and processes. Such subjective experiences do not emerge from the body, but neither do they emerge from nothing. Rather, all objective mental appearances arise from the substrate, and all subjective mental states and processes arise from the substrate consciousness.

=== Tibetan Buddhism ===
Tibetan Buddhist theories of mind evolved directly from the Indian Mahayana views. Thus the founder of the Gelug school, Je Tsongkhapa discusses the Yogācāra system of the Eight Consciousnesses in his Explanation of the Difficult Points. He would later come to repudiate Śāntarakṣita's pragmatic idealism. According to the 14th Dalai Lama the mind can be defined "as an entity that has the nature of mere experience, that is, 'clarity and knowing'. It is the knowing nature, or agency, that is called mind, and this is non-material." The simultaneously dual nature of mind is as follows:

1. Clarity (gsal) – The mental activity which produces cognitive phenomena (snang-ba).
2. Knowing (rig) – The mental activity of perceiving cognitive phenomena.

The 14th Dalai Lama has also explicitly laid out his theory of mind as experiential dualism which is described above under the different types of dualism.

Because Tibetan philosophy of mind is ultimately soteriological, it focuses on meditative practices such as Dzogchen and Mahamudra that allow a practitioner to experience the true reflexive nature of their mind directly. This unobstructed knowledge of one's primordial, empty and non-dual Buddha nature is called rigpa. The mind's innermost nature is described among various schools as pure luminosity or "clear light" ('od gsal) and is often compared to a crystal ball or a mirror. Sogyal Rinpoche speaks of mind thus: "Imagine a sky, empty, spacious, and pure from the beginning; its essence is like this. Imagine a sun, luminous, clear, unobstructed, and spontaneously present; its nature is like this."

=== Zen Buddhism ===
The central issue in Chinese Zen philosophy of mind is in the difference between the pure and awakened mind and the defiled mind. Chinese Chan master Huangpo described the mind as without beginning and without form or limit while the defiled mind was that which was obscured by attachment to form and concepts. The pure Buddha-mind is thus able to see things "as they truly are", as absolute and non-dual "thusness" (Tathatā). This non-conceptual seeing also includes the paradoxical fact that there is no difference between a defiled and a pure mind, as well as no difference between samsara and nirvana.

In the Shobogenzo, the Japanese philosopher Dogen argued that body and mind are neither ontologically nor phenomenologically distinct but are characterized by a oneness called shin jin (bodymind). According to Dogen, "casting off body and mind" (Shinjin datsuraku) in zazen will allow one to experience things-as-they-are (genjokoan) which is the nature of original enlightenment (hongaku).

== See also ==
- Animal consciousness
- Artificial consciousness
- Collective intentionality
- Outline of human intelligence
- Outline of thought
- Theory of mind in animals
