= Manas-vijnana =

Manas-vijnana (Skt. "'मानस-विज्ञान"'; mānas-vijñāna; "mind-knowledge", compare man-tra, jñāna) is the seventh of the eight consciousnesses as taught in Yogacara and Zen Buddhism, the higher consciousness or intuitive consciousness that on the one hand localizes experience through thinking and on the other hand universalizes experience through intuitive perception of the universal mind of alayavijnana. Manas-vijnana, also known as klista-manas-vijnana or simply manas, is not to be confused with manovijnana which is the sixth consciousness.

== Overlapping Pali terms for "mind" ==
According to Bhikkhu Bodhi, the post-canonical Pali commentary uses the three terms viññāṇa, mano and citta as synonyms for the mind sense base (mana-ayatana); however, in the Sutta Pitaka, these three terms are generally contextualized differently:

- Viññāṇa refers to awareness through a specific internal sense base, that is, through the eye, ear, nose, tongue, body or mind. Thus, there are six sense-specific types of Viññāṇa. It is also the basis for personal continuity within and across lives.
- Manas refers to mental "actions" (kamma), as opposed to those actions that are physical or verbal. It is also the sixth internal sense base (ayatana), that is, the "mind base," cognizing mental sensa (dhammā) as well as sensory information from the physical sense bases.
- Citta includes the formation of thought, emotion and volition; this is thus the subject of Buddhist mental development (bhava), the mechanism for release.

== Overlapping Sanskrit terms for "mind" ==
According to Daisetz Teitaro Suzuki (who uses the term "Manas" rather than "Manas Vijnana" for the seventh consciousness) the Lankavatara Sutra presents the Zen view of the Eight Consciousnesses rather than the Yogacara view. In his introduction to his translation of the Lankavatara Sutra he clarifies the distinction between the overlapping terms:

What may be termed Buddhist psychology in the Laṅkā consists in the analysis of mind, that is, in the classification of the Vijñānas. To understand thus the psychology of Buddhism properly the knowledge of these terms is necessary: citta, manas, vijñāna, manovijñāna, and ālayavijñāna.

To begin with Vijñāna. Vijñāna is composed of the prefix vi, meaning "to divide", and the root jñā which means "to perceive", "to know". Thus, Vijñāna is the faculty of distinguishing or discerning or judging. When an object is presented before the eye, it is perceived and judged as a red apple or a piece of white linen; the faculty of doing this is called eye-vijñāna. In the same way, there are ear-vijñāna for sound, nose-vijñāna for odour, tongue-vijñāna for taste, body-vijñāna for touch, and thought-vijñāna (manovijñāna) for ideas—altogether six forms of Vijñāna for distinguishing the various aspects of world external or internal.

Of these six Vijñānas, the Manovijñāna is the most important as it is directly related to an inner faculty known as Manas. Manas roughly corresponds to mind as an organ of thought, but in fact it is more than that, for it is also a strong power of attaching itself to the result of thinking. The former may even be considered subordinate to this power of attachment. The Manas first wills, then it discriminates to judge; to judge is to divide, and this dividing ends in viewing existence dualistically. Hence the Manas' tenacious attachment to the dualistic interpretation of existence. Willing and thinking are inextricably woven into the texture of Manas.

Citta comes from the root cit, "to think", but in the Laṅkā the derivation is made from the root ci, "to pile up", "to arrange in order". The Citta is thus a storehouse where the seeds of all thoughts and deeds are accumulated and stored up. The Citta, however, has a double sense, general and specific. When it is used in the general sense it means "mind", "mentation", "ideas", including the activities of Manas and Manovijñāna, and also of the Vijñānas; while specifically it is a synonym of Ālayavijñāna in its relative aspects, and distinguishable from all the rest of the mental faculties. When, however, it is used in the form of Citta-mātra, Mind-only, it acquires still another connotation. We can say that Citta appears here in its highest possible sense, for it is then neither simply mentation nor intellection, nor perception as a function of consciousness. It is identifiable with the Ālaya in its absolute aspect. This will become clearer later on.

Ālayavijñāna is ālaya+vijñāna, and ālaya is a store where things are hoarded for future use. The Citta as a cumulative faculty is thus identified with the Ālayavijñāna. Strictly speaking, the Ālaya is not a Vijñāna, has no discerning power in it; it indiscriminately harbours all that is poured into it through the channel of the Vijñānas. The Ālaya is perfectly neutral, indifferent, and does not offer to give judgments.

== Various descriptions of "Manas-vijnana" ==
- One of the primary functions of Manas-vijnana is to perceive the subjective position of the store consciousness and erroneously regard it as one's own ego, thereby creating ego attachment.
- The basic nature of Manas-vijnana is that of thought.
- There is a difference between the "thought" of this seventh consciousness, Manas-vijnana, and the sixth consciousness "thought" of cognition.
- Not consciously controllable, Manas-vijnana is said to be a mind of a realm that gives rise to contradiction of conscious decisions, and to incessant self-love.
- Manas-vijnana can be described as "the consciousness which sees the limits of human variation from within".
- Manas-vijnana consciousness is also described as the place where good and evil are eternally accumulated.
- Manas-vijnana consciousness is theorized as the connecting realm between the mano-consciousness and the ālayavijñāna.
- Manas-vijnana as the seventh consciousness is the basis of human existence, which unceasingly continues and changes, and serves as the ground for the sixth consciousness of cognition.
- In part II of Daisetz Teitaro Suzuki's Introduction, to his translation of the Lankavatara Sutra, the Manovijñāna, or "that which knows thought", is directly related to an inner faculty known as "Manas". "Manas" is a strong power that attaches to the result of thinking. From this viewpoint one could discern that the "thought-consciousness", that part of the mind that is conscious of thought, also has the power to attach or "velcro" itself to a completed thought process. This would explain the human difficulty of observing one's own thoughts, as the "manas" or "velcro" must first be detached, so to speak.
