= Vāsanā =

Technical term in Indian philosophy

Vāsanā (Sanskrit: वासना) is a behavioural tendency or karmic imprint which influences the present behaviour of a person. It is a technical term in Indian philosophy, particularly Yoga, Buddhist philosophy, and Advaita Vedanta.

== Nomenclature, orthography and etymology ==
Vāsanā (Devanagari: वासना, Tibetan: བག་ཆགས, Wylie: bag chags) and its near homonym vasana (Devanagari: वसन) are from the same Indo-European linguistic root, sharing a common theme of 'dwelling' or 'abiding'. (Note: The Dharma Dictionary provides the following semantic field for 'bag chags' (only a selection has been provided): vasana, karmic residues, unconscious propensities, disposition, habit energy, thought, habit formation, habit thought dormant, potential tendency, habitual pattern, habitual propensity, habitual tendency, impression, imprint, inclination, inherent tendency, inveterate tendency, karmic impression, karmic imprint, karmic propensities, imprints, predispositions; karmic traces, latency, latent predisposition, latent tendency, mental imprint, negative psychic imprint, potency, potential tendency, potentiality, predisposition, propensity, propensities, sediment of impressions. Tibetan synonym: nus pa, habitual patterning.)

- Vāsanā (Devanagari: वासना):
  - Past impressions, impressions formed, the present consciousness of past (life) perceptions;
  - The impression of anything in the mind, the present consciousness formed from past perceptions, knowledge derived from memory, the impressions remaining in the mind;
  - Thinking of, longing for, expectation, desire, inclination.
- Vasana (Devanagari: वसन): cloth, clothes, dress, garment, apparel, attire, dwelling or abiding.
- Vāsanai (Spoken Tamil): fragrance. Outside philosophical use, the borrowed word in Tamil keeps intact the root meaning for 'vāsanā'.

== Buddhism ==
Keown (2004) defines the term generally within Buddhism as follows:

"vāsanā (Skt.). Habitual tendencies or dispositions, a term, often used synonymously with bīja (‘seed’). It is found in Pāli and early Sanskrit sources but comes to prominence with the Yogācāra, for whom it denotes the latent energy resulting from actions which are thought to become ‘imprinted’ in the subject's storehouse-consciousness (ālaya-vijñāna). The accumulation of these habitual tendencies is believed to predispose one to particular patterns of behaviour in the future."

Sandvik (2007: unpaginated) states that:

... bag chags, in Sanskrit vāsanā. This word is used a lot in presentations about karma. It means habitual tendencies, subtle inclinations that are imprinted in the mind, like a stain. For example, if someone smokes, there will be a habitual tendency for an urge to smoke every day, usually around the same time. There are bigger picture bag chags, such as why some people are kind by nature, and others are cruel; it's the tendency to behave in a certain way that will trigger similar actions in future, reinforcing the bag chags.

—

D.T. Suzuki (1930) in The Lankavatara Sutra, connects vasana to its other meaning, 'infusing':

"Discrimination is the result of memory (vasana) accumulated from the unknown past. Vasana literally means "perfuming," or "fumigation," that is, it is a kind of energy that is left behind when an act is accomplished and has the power to rekindle the old and seek out new impressions. Through this "perfuming," reflection takes place which is the same thing as discrimination, and we have a world of opposites and contraries with all its practical consequences. The triple world, so called, is therefore the shadow of a self-reflecting and self-creating mind. Hence the doctrine of "Mind-only" (cittamātra)." p.96

=== Cheng Weishi Lun ===
Lusthaus states that the Cheng Weishi Lun (Chinese: 成唯識論), a commentary on Vasubandhu's Triṃśikā-vijñaptimātratā, lists three types of vāsanā, which are synonymous with 'bija' or 'seeds':

1. Vāsanā of 'names and words' or 'terms and words (Chinese: ming-yen hsi-chi'i) which equates to 'latent linguistic conditioning'. These seeds, planted in the 'root consciousness' (Sanskrit: alaya-vijnana) by 'terms and words' are the 'causes' (Sanskrit: hetu) and 'conditions' (Sanskrit: pratyaya) of each 'conditioned or caused element or phenomena' (Sanskrit: samskrita dharma). There are two forms:
  1. 'Terms and words indicating a referent' (Chinese: piao-yi ming yen) through which a mindstream is able to express (Chinese: ch'uan) meanings (yi, artha, referent) by differentiation of vocal sounds (Chinese: yin-sheng ch'a-pieh); and
  2. 'Terms and words revealing perceptual-fields' (Chinese: hsien-ching ming wen), through which a mindstream discerns (Sanskrit: vijnapti, upalabdhi) perceptual-fields (Sanskrit: visaya) as ' phenomena of mind' (Sanskrit: citta dharma; caitta dharmas).
2. Vasanas of self-attachment (Sanskrit: atma-graha-vasana; Chinese: wo-chih hsi-ch'i) denoting the false attachment to the seeds of 'me' and 'mine'.
3. Vasanas which link streams-of-being (Sanskrit: bhavanga-vasana; Chinese: yu-chih hsi-ch'i) denoting the karmic seeds, 'differently maturing (Sanskrit: vipaka) that carry over (Chinese: chao) from one stream-of-being to another in the Three Worlds (Sanskrit: Triloka). The bhavanga (linkage from one stream-of-being to the next) is of two types:
  1. Contaminated yet advantageous (Sanskrit: sasrava-kusala; Chinese: yu-lou shan) that is actions (Sanskrit: karma) which produce desirable (Chinese: k'e-ai) fruits; and
  2. Disadvantageous, that is actions which produce undesirable fruits.

=== Bon & Dzogchen ===
Bag chags are important in Bonpo soteriology, especially the view of the Bonpo Dzogchenpa, where it is fundamentally related to the key doctrines of 'Primordial Purity' (Tibetan: ཡེ་ནས་ཀ་དག, Wylie: ye nas ka dag (Note: ka dag is a contraction of ka nas dag pa), the 'Ground' (Tibetan: གཞི, Wylie: gzhi) and its 'Essence' (Tibetan: ངོ་བོ, Wylie: ngo bo), the Eight Consciousnesses and the 'All Ground' (Tibetan: ཀུན་གཞི, Wylie: kun gzhi) As Karmay relates in his English rendering of the Bonpo text 'Kunzi Zalshay Selwai Gronma' (Tibetan: ཀུན་གཞི་ཞལ་ཤེས་གསལ་བའི་སྒྲོན་མ, Wylie: kun gzhi zhal shes gsal ba'i sgron ma) from the Tibetan:

"Some people doubt that if kun gzhi is pure from the beginning, it cannot be accepted as the ground on which one accumulates one's impressions (bag chags), but if it is the ground for storing the bag chags, it cannot be pure from the beginning.

The essence of kun gzhi at no time has ever experienced being defiled by the bag chags since it is absolutely pure from the beginning. In that case, one might think that it cannot be the 'ground' for storing the bag chags. However, the bag chags are stored there only through the 'co-ordination' of all the eight kinds of consciousness. Kun gzhi is therefore merely the ground for storing the bag chags. It is like a treasury.
Although in the sphere of space, many a world came into existence and remains, the essence of space remains undefiled by the dirt of the world, even a particle of it. (Note: gang zag 'gas kun gzhi ye nas ka dag yin na/ bag chags sog gzhi yin par mi 'thad snam nas the tshom za ba la/ kun gzi ngo bo la dus gsum du bag chags kyis dri mas gos ma myong bas ka dag yin no/ 'o na bag chags sog gzhi ma yin snyam na/ bag chags ni rnam par shes pa tshogs brgyad zung du 'brel ba'i bag la sog pa yin no/ de yang kun gzhi ni bag chags sog pa'i gzhi tsam yin te dper na mdzod khang dang 'dra/ ... nam mkha'i klong du snang srid ji snyad cig chags shing gnas kyang/ nam mkha'i ngo bo la snang srid kyi dri mas rdul tsam yang ma gos pa bzhin no/ ZhNy Tsa, p. 427)

== Hinduism ==
The Ahirbudhnya Samhita describes vasana as seeds whose fruit is rebirth.

=== Vaishanavism ===
Śrīmad Bhāgavatam (5.11.5) (also known as the Bhagavata Purana), a principal text for the Vaishnava tradition of Sanatana Dharma employs the term 'vasana':

Devanagari	Roman Transcription
स वासनात्मा विषयोपरक्तो	sa vāsanātmā viṣayoparakto
गुणप्रवाहो विकृतः षोडशात्मा	guṇa-pravāho vikṛtaḥ ṣoḍaśātmā
बिभ्रत्पृथतङनामभि रूपभेदम्	bibhrat pṛthań-nāmabhi rūpa-bhedam
अन्तर्बहिष्ङवं च पुरैस्तनोति	antar-bahiṣṭvaṁ ca purais tanoti

A satisfactory English rendering has not yet been sourced, but the import is that the 'imprinted-volitions-of-mind' (vāsanātmā), whether pious or impious, are conditioned by the Gunas. The gunas propel the mind into different 'formations' (rūpa-bhedam). The 'mind' (atma) is the master of the sixteen material elements. (Note: The Mahābhūta, the Five Great Elements; The Ten Indriya, the ten senses or powers: The five agents of perception (jnanendriyas), hearing (shrotra), touch (tvak), sight (chakshus), taste (rasana) and smell (ghrana); The five agents of action (karmendriyas), speech (vak), grasping, by means of the hands (pani), movement (pada), excretion (payu) and generation (upastha); The mind) Its 'refined or coarse quality' (antaḥ-bahiṣṭvam) determines the mind-formations of manifestation (tanoti).

=== Advaita Vedanta ===
A vasana literally means 'wishing' or 'desiring', but is used in Advaita in the sense of the sub-conscious or latent tendencies in one’s nature.

Writing from an Advaita Vedanta perspective, Waite refers to a model offered by Edward de Bono: (Note: Edward de Bono (1969), "Mechanism of Mind". Viking, ISBN 0-14-021445-3)

If you take a jelly, solidified and turned out onto a plate, and you trickle very hot water onto the top, it will run off onto the plate and leave behind a faint channel where the hot water melted the jelly. If you now pour more hot water, it will tend to run into the same channels as before, since these offer the line of least resistance, and deepen the channels. If this is done repeatedly, very deep channels will form and it will become difficult, if not impossible, to get the water to run anywhere else. The equivalent of an entrenched habit has been formed.
