= Luminous mind =

Term used in Buddhist doctrine

Luminous mind (Skt: prabhāsvara-citta or ābhāsvara-citta, Pali: pabhassara citta; Tib: འོད་གསལ་གྱི་སེམས་ ’od gsal gyi sems; Ch: 光明心 guāngmíngxīn; Jpn: 光明心 kōmyōshin) is a Buddhist term that appears only rarely in the Pali Canon, but is common in the Mahayana sūtras and central to the Buddhist tantras. It is variously translated as "brightly shining mind" or "mind of clear light", while the related term luminosity (Skt. prabhāsvaratā; Tib. འོད་གསལ་བ་ ’od gsal ba; Ch. guāng míng; Jpn. kōmyō; Kor. kwangmyōng) is also translated as "clear light" or "luminosity" in Tibetan Buddhist contexts or "purity" in East Asian contexts.

The Theravada school identifies the "luminous mind" with the bhavanga, a concept first proposed in the Theravāda Abhidhamma. The later schools of the Mahayana identify it with bodhicitta and tathagatagarbha. The luminosity of mind is of central importance in the philosophy and practice of the Buddhist tantras, Mahamudra, and Dzogchen.

== Early Buddhist texts ==
The Early Buddhist Texts contain mentions of luminosity or radiance that refer to the development of the mind in meditation. In the Saṅgīti-sutta, for example, it relates to the attainment of samadhi, where the perception of light (āloka sañña) leads to a mind endowed with luminescence (sappabhāsa).

According to Anālayo, the Upakkilesa-sutta and its parallels mention that the presence of defilements "results in a loss of whatever inner light or luminescence (obhāsa) had been experienced during meditation". The Pali Dhātuvibhaṅga-sutta uses the metaphor of refining gold to describe equanimity reached through meditation, which is said to be "pure, bright, soft, workable, and luminous". The Chinese parallel to this text does not describe equanimity as luminous. Anālayo sees this difference as due to the propensity of the reciters of the Theravada canon to prefer fire and light imagery.

The Pali Anguttara Nikaya (A.I.8-10) states:

Luminous, monks, is the mind. And it is freed from incoming defilements. The well-instructed disciple of the noble ones discerns that as it actually is present, which is why I tell you that—for the well-instructed disciple of the noble ones—there is development of the mind.

A parallel passage can be found in the Śāriputrābhidharma, an Abhidharma treatise possibly of the Dharmaguptaka tradition.

Another mention of a similar term in the Pali discourses occurs in the Brahmanimantaṇika-sutta of the Majjhima-nikāya, and in the Kevaḍḍha-sutta of the Dīgha-nikāya, the latter has a parallel in a Dharmaguptaka collection surviving in Chinese translation.

The Brahmanimantaṇika-sutta describes an "invisible consciousness" (viññāṇaṃ anidassanaṃ) that is "infinite" (anantaṃ) and "luminous in every way" (sabbato pabhaṃ). There is disagreement among the various editions of the Pāli Canon as to whom the statement is spoken by, and in some editions it seems as if it is spoken not by the Buddha but by the deva Baka Brahmā in a debate with the Buddha. The Chinese parallel to the Brahmanimantaṇika-sutta has the term used by Baka Brahma.

The Kevaḍḍha-sutta and its parallel in the Dharmaguptaka Dīrgha-āgama, meanwhile, does have a statement spoken by the Buddha that mentions luminous consciousness. The Dīrgha-āgama sutra states:

Consciousness that is invisible, Infinite, and luminous of its own: This ceasing, the four elements cease, Coarse and subtle, pretty and ugly cease. Herein name-and-form cease. Consciousness ceasing, the remainder [i.e. name-and-form] also ceases.

Analayo mentions that parallel recensions of this sutra in other languages such as Sanskrit and Tibetan do not mention luminosity (pabhaṃ) and even the various Pali editions do not agree that this verse mentions luminosity, sometimes using pahaṃ ("given up") instead of pabhaṃ. Whatever the case, according to Analayo, the passage refers to "the cessation mode of dependent arising, according to which name-and-form cease with the cessation of consciousness".

According to Bhikkhu Brahmāli, the references to luminosity in the Brahmanimantaṇika-sutta refer to states of samadhi known only to ariyas (noble ones), while the pabhassaracitta of Anguttara Nikaya (A.I.8-10) is a reference to the mind in jhana. He cites a common passage that notes that the mind with the five hindrances is not considered radiant and thus it makes sense to say that a mind in jhana, which does not have the five hindrances, can be said to be radiant:

So too, bhikkhus, there are these five corruptions of the mind (cittassa), corrupted by which the mind is neither malleable nor wieldy nor radiant (pabhassaraṃ) but brittle and not rightly concentrated for the destruction of the taints. What five? Sensual desire ... ill will ... sloth and torpor ... restlessness and remorse ... doubt is a corruption of the mind, corrupted by which the mind is neither malleable nor wieldy nor radiant but brittle and not rightly concentrated for the destruction of the taints. (SN V 92 and A III 16, cf. AN I 257 and MN III 243).

== Theravada ==
The Theravadin Anguttara Nikaya Atthakatha commentary identifies the luminous mind as the bhavanga, the "ground of becoming" or "latent dynamic continuum", the most fundamental level of mental functioning in the Theravada Abhidhammic scheme. The Kathavatthu also explains the luminous mind sutra passage as the bhavanga, which is the mind in its nature state (pakaticitta) and is described as luminous. This interpretation is also used by Buddhaghosa in his commentary on the Dhammasangani. Buddhaghosa also mentions that the mind is made luminous by the fourth jhana in his Visuddhimagga.

Thanissaro Bhikkhu holds that the commentaries' identification of the luminous mind with the bhavanga is problematic, but Peter Harvey finds it to be a plausible interpretation.

Ajahn Mun, the leading figure behind the modern Thai Forest Tradition, comments on this verse:

The mind is something more radiant than anything else can be, but because counterfeits—passing defilements—come and obscure it, it loses its radiance, like the sun when obscured by clouds. Don’t go thinking that the sun goes after the clouds. Instead, the clouds come drifting along and obscure the sun. So meditators, when they know in this manner, should do away with these counterfeits by analyzing them shrewdly... When they develop the mind to the stage of the primal mind, this will mean that all counterfeits are destroyed, or rather, counterfeit things won’t be able to reach into the primal mind, because the bridge making the connection will have been destroyed. Even though the mind may then still have to come into contact with the preoccupations of the world, its contact will be like that of a bead of water rolling over a lotus leaf.

Thanissaro Bhikkhu sees the luminous mind as "the mind that the meditator is trying to develop. To perceive its luminosity means understanding that defilements such as greed, aversion, or delusion are not intrinsic to its nature, are not a necessary part of awareness." He associates the term with the simile used to describe the fourth jhana, which states:

Just as if a man were sitting covered from head to foot with a white cloth so that there would be no part of his body to which the white cloth did not extend; even so, the monk sits, permeating the body with a pure, bright awareness. There is nothing of his entire body unpervaded by pure, bright awareness.

== Mahāsāṃghika ==
The Mahāsāṃghikas also held that the mind’s nature (cittasvabhāva) is fundamentally pure (mulavisuddha), but can be contaminated by adventitious defilements. Vasumitra's Nikayabheda-dharmamati-chakra-sastra discusses this theory, and cites the sutra passage the Mahāsāṃghikas drew on to defend it. This passage is quoted by Vasumitra as:

The self-nature of the mind (cittasvabhāva) is luminous (prabhāsvara). It is the adventitious impurities (āgantukopakleśa) that defile it. The self substance of the mind is eternally pure.

K’ouei-ki's commentary on Vasumitra adds: "It is because afflictions (kleśa) are produced which soil it that it is said to be defiled. But these defilements, not being of the original nature of the mind, are called adventitious."

The Kathāvatthu (III, 3) also cites this idea as a thesis of the Andhakas (i.e. Mahāsāṃghikas in Andhra Pradesh).

== Vaibhāṣika ==
In contrast, the Sarvāstivāda-Vaibhāṣika school held that the mind was not naturally luminous. According to Skorupski for Vaibhāṣika, the mind:

is initially or originally contaminated by defilements, and must be purified by abandoning defilements. For them a primordially luminous mind cannot be contaminated by adventitious defilements. If such a mind were contaminated by adventitious defilements, then these naturally impure defilements would become pure once they become associated with the naturally luminous mind. On the other hand, if adventitious defilements remained to be impure, then a naturally luminous mind would not become defiled by their presence. For them the constantly evolving mind is in possession of defilements.

== Mahayana ==
In Sanskrit Mahayana texts and their translations, the term is a compound of the intensifying prefix pra-; the verbal root bhāsa (Tibetan: 'od), which means light, radiance or luminosity; and the modifier vara (Tibetan: gsal ba), which means "clear" or "the best of, the highest type". Jeffrey Hopkins's Tibetan-Sanskrit dictionary glosses the term compound as:

clear light; clearly luminous; transparently luminous; translucent; brightly shining; transparent lucidity; splendor; radiance; illumination; spread the light; lustre; come to hear; effulgence; brilliance.

=== Mahayana texts ===
Mahayana sutras generally affirm the mind's pure and luminous nature, adding that this is its natural condition (prakṛtiś cittasya prabhāsvarā). In the Pañcavimsati Prajñaparamita sutra, the prabhsvara-citta is interpreted thus:

This mind (citta) is no-mind (acitta), because its natural character is luminous. What is this state of the mind’s luminosity (prabhsvarat)? When the mind is neither associated with nor dissociated from greed, hatred, delusion, proclivities (anusaya), fetters (samyojana), or false views (drsti), then this constitutes its luminosity. Does the mind exist as no-mind? In the state of no-mind (acittat), the states of existence (astit) or non-existence (nstit) can be neither found nor established... What is this state of no-mind? The state of no-mind, which is immutable (avikra) and undifferentiated (avikalpa), constitutes the ultimate reality (dharmat) of all dharmas. Such is the state of no-mind.

A similar teaching appears in some recensions of the Aṣṭasāhasrikā (8000 lines) Prajñāpāramitā Sūtra. Edward Conze considered the teaching on the "essential purity of the nature of mind" (prakrti cittasya prabhasvara; xinxiang benjing, 心相本淨) a central Mahayana teaching. According to Shi Huifeng, this term is not present in the earliest textual witness of the Aṣṭasāhasrikā, the Daoxing Banruo Jing, attributed to Lokaksema (c. 179 CE).

Mahayana texts like the Ratnagotravibhanga also associate prabhsvara with awakening (bodhi) and another term, natural or original purity of mind (cittaprakrtivisuddhi).

In some Mahayana treatises, natural purity is another term for Emptiness, Suchness and Dharmadhatu. Asanga's Mahayanasamgraha, for example, states:

The essential purity (prakṛtivyavadāna), i.e., the true nature (tathatā), emptiness (śūnyatā), the utmost point of reality (bhūtakoti), the signless (animitta), the absolute (paramārtha), the fundamental element (dharmadhātu).

The Bhadrapala-sutra states that the element of consciousness (vijñanadhatu) is pure and penetrates all things while not being affected by them, like the rays of the sun, even though it may appear defiled. This sutra states:

Furthermore, Bhadrapāla, the element of consciousness is completely purified; it encompasses everything, yet it is not tainted by anything.

=== Alaya-vijñana ===
According to Walpola Rahula, all the elements of the Yogacara store-consciousness (alaya-vijnana) are already found in the Pali Canon. He writes that the three layers of the mind (citta, called "luminous" in the passage discussed above, manas, and vijnana) as presented by Asanga are also used in the Pali Canon.

According to Yogacara teachings, as in early Buddhist teachings regarding the citta, the store-consciousness is not pure, and with the attainment of nirvana comes a level of mental purity that is hitherto unattained.

=== Svasaṃvedana ===
In Tibetan Buddhism, the luminous mind (Tibetan: gsal ba) is often equated with the Yogacara concept of svasaṃvedana (reflexive awareness). It is often compared to a lamp in a dark room, which in the act of illuminating objects in the room also illuminates itself.

=== Tathagatagarbha ===
In the canonical discourses, when the brightly shining citta is "unstained", it is supremely poised for arahantship, and so could be conceived as the "womb" of the arahant, for which a synonym is tathagata. The discourses do not support seeing the "luminous mind" as "nirvana within", which exists before liberation. While the Canon does not support the identification of the "luminous mind" in its raw state with nirvanic consciousness, passages could be taken to imply that it can be transformed into the latter. Upon the destruction of the fetters, according to one scholar, "the shining nibbanic consciousness flashes out of the womb of arahantship, being without object or support, so transcending all limitations."

Both the Shurangama Sutra and the Lankavatara Sutra describe the tathagatagarbha ("buddha womb") as "by nature brightly shining and pure" and "originally pure", though "enveloped in the garments of the skandhas, dhatus and ayatanas and soiled with the dirt of attachment, hatred, delusion and false imagining." It is said to be "naturally pure", but it appears impure as it is stained by adventitious defilements. Thus the Lankavatara Sutra identifies the luminous mind of the Canon with the tathagatagarbha. Some Gelug philosophers, in contrast to teachings in the Lankavatara Sutra, maintain that the "purity" of the tathagatagarbha is not because it is originally or fundamentally pure, but because mental flaws can be removed—that is, like anything else, they are not part of an individual's fundamental essence. These thinkers thus refuse to turn epistemological insight about emptiness and Buddha-nature into an essentialist metaphysics.

The Shurangama Sutra and the Lankavatara Sutra also equate the tathagatagarbha (and alaya-vijnana) with nirvana, though this is concerned with the actual attainment of nirvana as opposed to nirvana as a timeless phenomenon.

=== Bodhicitta ===
The Mahayana interprets the brightly shining citta as bodhicitta, the altruistic "spirit of awakening". The Astasahasrika Perfection of Wisdom Sutra describes bodhicitta thus: "That citta is no citta since it is by nature brightly shining". This is in accord with Anguttara Nikaya I,10, which goes from a reference to brightly shining citta to saying that even the slightest development of loving-kindness is of great benefit. This implies that loving-kindness—and the related state of compassion—is inherent in the luminous mind as a basis for its further development. The observation that the ground state of consciousness is of the nature of loving-kindness implies that empathy is innate to consciousness and exists before the emergence of active mental processes.

=== Vajrayana ===
Luminosity or clear light (Tibetan: འོད་གསལ་, Wylie: 'od gsal, THL: ösel; Sanskrit: prabhāsvara) is a central concept in Esoteric Buddhism, Tibetan Buddhism, and Bon. It is the mind's innate condition, associated with buddha-nature, the realisation of which is the goal of meditative practice. It is said to be experienced when the coarse and subtle minds dissolve during deep sleep, during orgasm, and during the death process. All systems of Tibetan Buddhism agree that the mind's clear light nature is non-conceptual and free from all mental afflictions, and that tantra is the superior method of working with this nature of the mind.

The Indian tantric commentator Indrabhuti, in his Jñanasiddhi, writes:

Being luminous by nature, this mind is similar to the moon's disc. The lunar disc epitomises the knowledge (jñāna) that is luminous by nature. Just as the waxing moon gradually emerges in its fullness, in the same way the mind-jewel (cittaratna), being naturally luminous, also fully emerges in its perfected state. Just as the moon becomes fully visible, once it is freed from the accidental obscurities, in the same way the mind-jewel, being pure by nature (prakṛti-pariśuddha), once separated from the stains of defilements (kleśa), appears as the perfected buddha-qualities (guṇa).

Luminosity is also a specific term for one of the Six Yogas of Naropa. In his commentary, Pema Karpo says that all human beings briefly experience the clear light at the very first moment of death, while advanced yogic practitioners do so in the highest states of meditation, and Buddhas experience it unceasingly.

Various Vajrayana practices involve the recognition of this aspect of mind in different situations, such as dream yoga. In this case, the practitioner trains to lucidly enter the deep sleep state. If one has the ability to remain lucid during deep sleep, one can recognize the luminosity of death and gain Buddhahood. This is called the meeting of mother and child luminosities, resulting in the state of thukdam at death.

=== Dzogchen ===
In Tibetan Buddhist Dzogchen literature, luminosity ('od gsal) is associated with the sambhogakāya aspect of the Ground, termed "spontaneous presence" (lhun grub), a presence that is uncreated and not based on anything causally extraneous to itself. This term is often paired with the dharmakāya aspect of "original-purity" (ka dag), associated with emptiness (shunyata). The two are seen as inseparable (zung 'jug) aspects of the Ground. Other terms used to describe this aspect are dynamism or creative power (rtsal) and radiance (mdangs).

== See also ==
- Anutpada – Buddhist concept for the absence of an origin
- Astral body – Concept of a subtle body, intermediate between the soul and body
- Divine illumination – Human thought aided by divine grace
- Divine spark – Theological concept about the portion of God that resides within each human being
- Energy being – Alleged life form composed of energy rather than matter
- Etheric body – Concept in neo-Theosophy
- Illusory body – Tibetan Buddhist practice
- Mindstream – Buddhist concept of continuity of mind
- No-mind – State of mind in East Asian culture
- Rainbow body – Level of realization within Tibetan Buddhism
- Sahaja – Spontaneous enlightenment in Indian and Tibetan Buddhism
- Stream of consciousness (psychology) – Thoughts flowing through the conscious mind
- Spirit body – In LDS theology, man's spiritual element, made in the likeness of God
- Subtle body – Quasi material aspect of the human body
- Turiya – Hindu philosophical term for the perceiving self as atman
