= Mahāyānasaṃgraha =

The Mahāyānasaṃgraha (MSg) (Sanskrit; Chinese: 攝大乘論; pinyin: Shè dàchéng lùn, Tibetan: theg pa chen po bsdus pa), or the Mahāyāna Compendium/Summary, is a key work of the Yogācāra school of Mahāyāna Buddhist philosophy, attributed to Asanga (c. 310–390 CE). The MSg is a comprehensive work on the central doctrines and practices of the Yogacara school. It was translated into Chinese by Paramartha (499–567 CE) and became the central text of the Shelun school. Although no Sanskrit original has been found, the work survives in Tibetan (Tohoku, 4050; Peking, 5551.) and Chinese translations (Taishō Tripiṭaka 1592, 1593, 1594), together with commentaries. There are two commentaries to the work; Vasubandhu's Mahāyānasaṃgraha-bhāṣya and the Mahāyānasaṃgraha-panibandhana by Asvabhava (first half of the sixth century).

== Content ==
In ten chapters, Asanga's Mahāyānasaṃgraha expounds the major doctrines of the Mahayana Yogacara school such as the ālayavijñāna (storehouse consciousness), the 'three forms of existence' (trisvabhāva), the five paths (pañcamārga) and the Dharmakaya.

The ten chapters are the following:

1. Jñeyāśraya ("The Support for the Knowable", or "The Foundation of What is to be Known")
2. Jñeyalakṣaṇa ("The Distinguishing Characteristics of the Knowable" or "The Characteristics of What is to be Known")
3. "Penetrating the Characteristics of What is to be Known" - discusses the path to awakening (mārga),
4. "The Causes and Results of this Penetration", discusses the six perfections (ṣaṭpāramitā),
5. "The Divisions of Cultivating These Causes and Results" discusses the ten stages of a bodhisattva (daśabhūmi).
6. "Training in Superior Discipline" (śīla),
7. "Training in Superior Samādhi"
8. "Training in Superior Prajñā"
9. "The Relinquishment That is the Result of This training", discusses the “transformation of the basis” (āśrayaparāvṛtti)
10. "The Wisdom That Is the Result of This Training", discusses Buddhahood, the Dharmakāya.

In his introduction to the Mahāyānasaṃgraha, Asanga outlines these ten main topics as follows:

Through these instructions in that fashion, the ten topics that are not taught in the śrāvakayāna are taught in the mahāyāna as follows: (1) The ālaya-consciousness is taught as the foundation of what is to be known. (2) The three natures—the dependent, the imaginary, and the perfect [natures]—are taught as the characteristics of what is to be known. (3) Mere cognizance is taught as penetrating the characteristics of what is to be known. (4) The six pāramitās are taught as the causes and results of penetrating these [characteristics]. (5) The ten bhūmis of bodhisattvas are taught as the divisions of cultivating the causes and results of this [penetration]. (6) The bodhisattva vows are taught as the superior discipline within this [division of cultivation]. (7) Samādhis such as Heroic Stride and Sky Treasure are taught as the superior mind within this [division of cultivation]. (8) Nonconceptual wisdom is taught as the superior prajñā [within this division of cultivation]. (9) The nonabiding nirvāṇa is taught as the relinquishment that is the result of this [training]. (10) The three kāyas of a buddha—the svābhāvika[kāya], the sambhogakāya, and the nirmāṇakāya—are taught as the wisdom that is the result of this [training].

In its first chapter, the compendium offers the most extensive analysis of the Yogacara concept of "storehouse consciousness" of any early Yogacara text. According to Asanga, this is a subliminal consciousness in which impressions (vasanas) from past experiences are stored as the seeds (bija) of future experiences. The active consciousness (pravrtti-vijñana) of present experience grows from these seeds. According to Asanga, humans are just this stream of consciousness formed from the ālayavijñāna and the "active consciousness" arising from it and planting new seeds in the storehouse consciousness.

The second chapter of the MSg is devoted to the doctrine of the 'three forms of existence' or 'three patterns' (trisvabhāva). This doctrine holds that all beings possess three patterns - the dependent (paratantra), the imagined (parikalpita) and the consummate (pariniṣpanna). John Keenan explains the three patterns thus:

The most basic is the other dependent pattern (paratantra-svabhåva), which, in a word, is the above structure of consciousness as co-arising in an interplay between the container and the active consciousnesses and in the interplay between image and insight in thinking. The imagined pattern (parikalpita-svabhåva) is the failure to understand this basic structure and the consequent clinging to things as if they had enduring essences. Frozen at the presentation of images as essences, one mistakenly affirms the reality of things that are in their very being empty and nonexistent. All things are empty inasmuch as all the ideas that are projected in the imagined pattern are without essence. The perfected pattern (parinipanna-svabhåva), which Paramårtha renders as reality pattern, is the absence of imagining in the other dependent pattern and the consequent recovery of its basic nature as other-dependent.

Chapter three expounds the doctrine of representation only as a rejection of the subject-object dichotomy. Chapters four to nine are an overview of the Bodhisattva's advance through the practice of the paramitas (perfections) and the stages of realization. Chapter ten discusses the nature of wisdom as related to the Trikaya doctrine.

== Translations ==
- Karl Brunnhölzl, trans., A Compendium of the Mahayana: Asanga's Mahayanasamgraha and Its Indian and Tibetan Commentaries (Tsadra), 3 volumes; Boulder, Colorado: Snow Lion, 2019. ISBN 1-559394-65-X
- John Keenan, trans., The Summary of the Great Vehicle by Bodhisattva Asaṅga (Berkeley, Calif: Numata Center for Buddhist Translation and Research, 1992), translated from the Chinese of Paramārtha (Taishō vol. 31, number 1593). ISBN 1-886439-21-4; Revised Second Edition 2003 (digital 2014)
- Chikafumi Watanabe, Asanga's Mahayanasamgraha, Chapter III: Translation and Tibetan Text, D.K.Printworld, New Delhi, India, 2013.
- Paul Griffiths, Noriaki Hakamaya, John P. Keenan, and Paul L. Swanson; The Realm of Awakening: Chapter Ten of Asanga’s Mahayanasamgraha, New York and Oxford: Oxford University Press, 1989.
- Étienne Lamotte, ed. and trans., La Somme du Grand Véhicule d'Asaṅga (Mahāyānasaṁgraha), 2 volumes; Louvain: Institut Orientaliste, Université de Louvain, 1973.

== See also ==
- Abhidharma-samuccaya
- Yogacarabhumi-sastra

== Sources ==
- Frauwallner, Erich (1969). Die Philosophie des Buddhismus. 3d rev. ed. Berlin
- Paul, Diana (1984), Philosophy of Mind in Sixth-Century China: Paramartha's Evolution of Consciousness, Stanford, Calif.: Stanford University Press
- Nagao Gadjin, Shodaijoron: Wayaku to chukai, Tokyo.
- Alan Sponberg (1979). Liberation in Yogācāra Buddhism, Journal of the International Association of Buddhist Studies 2(1), pp. 47–49
