= Laṅkāvatāra Sūtra =

Mahāyāna Buddhist scripture

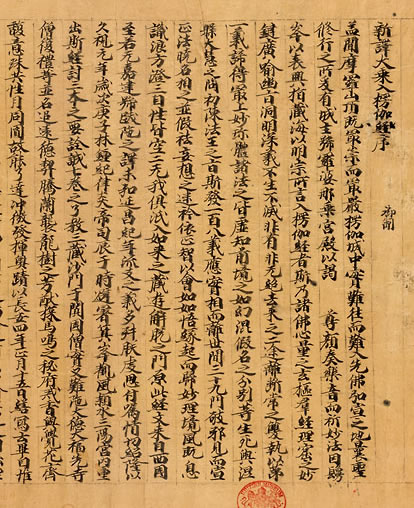
Copy of the Laṅkāvatāra Sūtra written in Chinese from Dunhuang in the British Library

The Laṅkāvatāra Sūtra (Sanskrit: लङ्कावतारसूत्रम्, "Discourse of the Descent into Laṅkā", Standard Tibetan: ལང་ཀར་བཤེགས་པའི་མདོ་, Chinese: 入楞伽經) is a prominent Mahayana Buddhist sūtra. It is also titled Laṅkāvatāraratnasūtram (The Jewel Sutra of the Entry into Laṅkā, Gunabhadra's Chinese title: 楞伽阿跋多羅寶經 léngqié ābáduōluó bǎojīng) and Saddharmalaṅkāvatārasūtra (The Sutra on the Descent of the True Dharma into Laṅkā). A subtitle to the sutra found in some sources is "the heart of the words of all the Buddhas" (一切佛語心 yiqiefo yuxin, Sanskrit: sarvabuddhapravacanahṛdaya).

The Laṅkāvatāra recounts a teaching primarily between Gautama Buddha and a bodhisattva named Mahāmati ("Great Wisdom"). The sūtra is set in mythical Laṅkā, ruled by Rāvaṇa, the king of the rākṣasas. The Laṅkāvatāra discusses numerous Mahayana topics, such as Yogācāra philosophy of mind-only (cittamātra) and the three natures, the ālayavijñāna (store-house consciousness), the inner "disposition" (gotra), the buddha-nature, the luminous mind (prabhāsvaracitta), emptiness (śūnyatā) and vegetarianism.

The Laṅkāvatāra Sūtra was often quoted and paraphrased by Indian philosophers like Chandrakirti and Shantideva, and it also figured prominently in the development of East Asian Buddhism. It is notably an important sūtra in Chan/Zen Buddhism, as it discusses the key issue of "sudden enlightenment". The text survives in one Sanskrit manuscript from Nepal as well as in Tibetan and Han Chinese translation.

== Overview and main themes ==
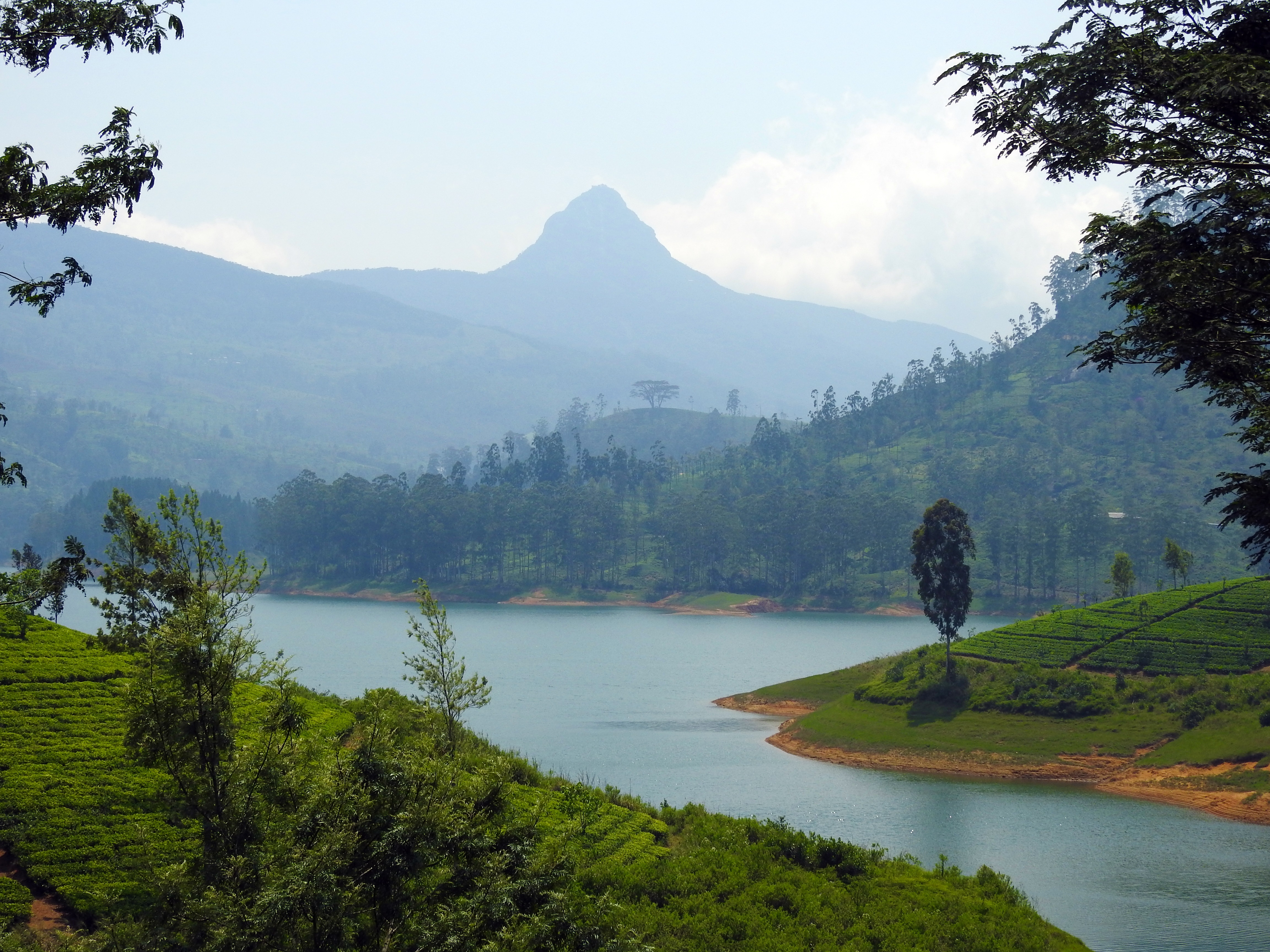
Mount Malaya (also known as Sri Pada), Sri Lanka, the main setting of the sutra.

Various scholars like DT Suzuki and Takasaki Jikido have noted that the text is somewhat unsystematic and disorganized, resembling the notebook or commonplace book of a Mahayana master which recorded important teachings. According to Takasaki Jikido, the Lanka "is, as often said, merely a mosaic collection of small parts put at random within the frame of a sutra."

The present Sanskrit edition contains ten chapters and most scholars consider the introductory chapter (the "Ravana" chapter), the ninth chapter (a dharani) and the last chapter (the Sagathakam verses) as being later additions. Furthermore, not all versions of the sutra contain these chapters (1, 9, 10). However, some verses found in the Sagathakam are also duplicates and are found within the main body of the sutra. Takasaki Jikido has argued that these verse portions might actually be the earliest core of the sutra, around which prose explanations grew.

The Laṅkāvatāra Sūtra draws on and explains numerous important Mahayana Buddhist concepts including the philosophy of Yogācāra school, the doctrine of emptiness (śūnyatā), and the doctrines of buddha-nature (tathāgatagarbha), and the luminous mind (prabhāsvaracitta). In the introduction to the sutra (the nidana), the sutra outlines some key teachings which will be expounded on, "the Five Dharmas and the Three Inherent Natures (pañcadharmasvabhāva), the Eight Consciousnesses (vijñāna) and the Two forms of Selflessness (nairātmyādvaya)." Indeed, the sutra later states that within this set of teachings is included "all of the Mahayana".

According to Nguyen Dac Sy, the most important doctrines of the Laṅkāvatāra are the primacy of consciousness (Skt. vijñānavada), the teaching that consciousness as the only reality and that "all the objects of the world, and the names and forms of experience, are manifestations of the mind" as well as the "identification of the Buddha-nature (in the state of tathāgatagarbha) with alayavijñāna".

Other topics discussed in the sutra include Buddhist vegetarianism, the theory of icchantikas, the wrong views of non-buddhists (tirthikas, especially Samkhya), a critique of the sravakayana, the limited nature of language in describing the ultimate truth, the One Vehicle, the bodhisattva path, and the three bodies of the Buddha (trikaya) doctrine.

=== Svacittamātra ===
The Laṅkāvatāra Sūtra often presents a mind-only philosophy influenced by the idealistic thought of the Yogacara school. According to the Laṅkāvatāra Sūtra "all things are only manifestations of the mind itself" i.e. all phenomena are "mind-only" (cittamātra) or "ideation-only" (vijñaptimatra). This idealistic view is explained by the Lanka as the view that "what is seen as something external is nothing but one's own mind" (svacitta-drsya-mātram)." According to Gishin Tokiwa, this is not to say that there are no independent external beings conventionally, but rather what it means is that true insight into the nature of reality goes beyond all concepts of internal and external. Gishin Tokiwa sees the theory of svacittamātra as the central message of the sutra.

The sutra often presents Yogacara theories of consciousness, like the eight consciousnesses and the three natures, as well as the "five dharmas". Furthermore, since, as the sutra states, the whole world "is nothing but a complex manifestation of one's mental activities," all phenomena are empty of self (anatman) and illusory (maya) - "to be regarded as forms seen in a vision and a dream, empty of substance, unborn and without self-nature."

Tokiwa further writes that the Laṅkāvatāra, being closely influenced by Prajñaparamita thought, also tempers this idealistic mind-only view with the idea that ultimate reality transcends being and non-being (bhāvābhāva), and is beyond all views and concepts, even that of "mind" (citta) itself. Thus, even though the Lanka presents a "mind-only" view in some passages, other sections state that the ultimate truth or Suchness transcends even mind, thought, discrimination and subjectivity itself. Furthermore, the reason why all things are beyond being and non-being is closely connected to the idea that all experiences are mind only. It is because all experiences are just reflections of the mind of those deluded beings which experience them that we can say that phenomena have no single characteristic or way of existing. All things are experienced (or not experienced) in various ways (vaicitryam) by different types of living beings, but none of these experiences are fixed or ultimately true, each one is mistaken (bhranti) in some way. At the same time, we can say that this ultimate nature of the emptiness of all characteristics is something that does not change. This ultimate reality, the dharmakaya, is also free from arising, abiding and cessation while also being the ground for the illusory manifestation of the world.

In spite of this however, the view of "mind-only" is still seen as an important way to transcend our current deluded state, as the Lanka sutra states:

Through attaining the reality as nothing but our own mind, which is the Self free from manifestation, we return to abiding in the final attainment of prajña.

In turn, the view that the world and phenomena exist "externally", outside of mind, is seen as a serious error that leads to delusion and suffering. The Lanka sutra specifically cites the dualistic view of Samkhya philosophy for criticism.

=== The Five Dharmas ===
According to Saganuma, the schema of the Five Dharmas (pañcadharma), which explains all of reality in terms of five phenomena, is essential for understanding the basic worldview of the Laṅkāvatāra. Indeed, according to Saganuma, the Laṅkāvatāra considers that all Mahayana teachings are included within these five dharmas.

The Five Dharmas are the following:

- Nimitta (images, appearances), this is what has characteristics like form (rupa), shape, distinctive features, and images (ākāra).
- Nāma (naming), these are the ideas (saṃjñā) based on the appearances
- Samkalpa, Vikalpa (discrimination), the distinctions and connections between different names and ideas that allow us to distinguish between them
- Samyagjñāna (right knowledge), the knowledge gained by bodhisattvas who understand the true nature of things (i.e. Suchness) and who transcend the discriminations of worldly people
- Tathatā (Suchness), the truth, ultimate reality, which is beyond all words, images and discrimination, beyond all duality and plurality.

The Lanka also closely connects this theory with the Yogacara theory of the three inherent natures. According to the Lanka, image, naming and discrimination correspond to the parikalpita-svabhāva (the "fully conceptualized" nature) and the paratantra-svabhāva (dependent nature), while right knowledge and Suchness correspond to the pariniṣpanna-svabhāva (the fully accomplished nature).

=== The buddha-nature and emptiness ===
A major topic found in the Laṅkāvatāra are the teachings on tathāgatagarbha (buddha-nature) also called buddhagotra (buddha disposition or buddha lineage) or tathagatagotra, which is explained in many different ways throughout the sutra. The Lanka describes buddha-nature as "the purity of natural luminosity, it is primordially pure, endowed with the thirty-two major marks, and hidden within the bodies of all sentient beings...just like a gem of great value wrapped in a stained cloth, it is wrapped up in the cloth of the skandhas, dhātus, and āyatanas, is tainted by the stains of desire, hatred, ignorance, and false imagination but is permanent, eternal, peaceful, and everlasting".

Buddha-nature is also equated with the wisdom of noble beings, "the attainment of the realization of suchness" (tathata) and the perfected nature (pariniṣpanna). Furthermore, the Lanka explains buddha-nature in a positive manner as the naturally luminous mind (prabhāsvaracitta) and also equates it with the "true self" which is realized by "those whose minds are not distracted by emptiness."

However, the Laṅkāvatāra also states that buddha-nature is not a self (atman), calls it selfless (nairātmya), and states that it is empty of self-nature. The Lanka further states that buddha-nature is merely a skillful means (upaya) of teaching the dharma to non-buddhists (tīrthikas) who cling to a self:

Mahāmati, my instruction on the tathāgatagarbha is not similar to the doctrine of the self of the tīrthikas. Rather, Mahāmati, the tathāgatas give the instruction on the tathāgatagarbha as bearing the meaning of words such as emptiness, true end, nirvāṇa, nonarising, signlessness, and wishlessness. Thus, for the sake of relinquishing what makes naive beings afraid of the lack of a self, the tathāgata arhats, the completely perfect buddhas, teach the sphere of nonconceptuality and nonappearance through the introductory instruction on the tathāgatagarbha...Mahāmati, the tathāgatas teach the instruction on the tathāgatagarbha through teaching the tathāgatagarbha in order to attract the tīrthikas, who cling to the doctrine of the self. So how may those whose thinking falls into the views of conceiving an incorrect self and those who succumb to falling into the sphere of three [kinds of] liberation swiftly awaken to unsurpassable and completely perfect awakening? Mahāmati, it is for their sake that the tathāgata arhats, the completely perfect buddhas, give the instruction on the tathāgatagarbha. Therefore, this is not similar to the doctrine of a self of the tīrthikas. Consequently, in order to put an end to the views of the tīrthikas, they need to become followers of the heart of nonself of a tathāgata (tathāgatanairātmyagarbha).

According to Brunnhölzl, the Lanka further states that what "all sūtras of all buddhas teach is nothing but emptiness, nonarising, nonduality, and the lack of nature". The sutra also states that "all characteristics of conceptions have terminated, either through the instruction on the tathāgatagarbha or through the instruction on identitylessness". Karl Brunnhölzl notes that throughout various passages, the Lanka attempts to unify the positive buddha-nature teachings and the more negative emptiness teachings, presenting them as being equivalent to each other and as non-contradictory.

=== The storehouse consciousness and buddha-nature ===
In other passages, the tathāgatagarbha ("buddha-womb" or buddha-source) is also equated with the "storehouse consciousness" (Skt. ālayavijñāna), the most fundamental layer of consciousness which contains the karmic seeds of defilement. However, in other further passages, the tathāgatagarbha is also said to be free from all eight consciousnesses and "free from the characteristics of mind, without consciousness and mentation."

As noted by Brunnhölzl, this paradoxical storehouse consciousness qua buddha-nature contains both contaminated and uncontaminated latent tendencies (anusaya). Further, it is both momentary and not momentary, it is the cause of virtue and non-virtue, it is the cause of all existences in saṃsāra, and thus it must be purified. But, at the same time, this same buddha-nature is described as indestructible, free from a self, naturally pure and free from the flaw of impermanence. It is compared to a dancer who does various performances and yet also to pure gold or a diamond that is never tarnished or changed. The Lanka sutra states that this buddha-nature storehouse-consciousness is something that cannot be fully understood by those who are not Buddhas.

The Laṅkāvatāra explains this paradoxical buddha-nature consciousness which is defiled and yet undefiled as follows:

Mahāmati, the tathāgatagarbha contains the causes of virtue and non-virtue and is the creator of all births and forms of existence. Free from a self and what is mine, like a dancer, it enters [all kinds of] dangerous forms of existence...Being impregnated by all kinds of beginningless latent tendencies of the impregnations of negative tendencies of discursiveness, it is called "ālaya-consciousness." Its body, together with the seven consciousnesses that arise from the ground of the latent tendencies of ignorance, always operates uninterruptedly, just like a great ocean and its waves, is free from the flaw of impermanence, is the cessation of the position of a self, and is utterly pure by nature. The seven consciousnesses such as mentation and the mental consciousness, which are other than this and arise and perish, are momentary, arise from the cause that is false imagination, focus on collections of shapes, activities, and distinct instances, cling to names and characteristics, do not understand that appearing forms and characteristics are one’s own mind, do not discriminate happiness and suffering, are not the cause for liberation, arise through and give rise to names, characteristics, and rising desire, and have the [ālaya-consciousness] as their cause and support...However, if the ālaya-consciousness, which is known as "the tathāgatagarbha," does not undergo a change (parāvṛtti), there is no cessation of the seven active consciousnesses. For what reason? Because the consciousnesses flourish by virtue of [the ālaya-consciousness’s serving as] their cause and support, and [because the ālaya-consciousness] is not an object of any of the yogins [who are immersed] in the yogas of śrāvakas, pratyekabuddhas, and tīrthikas. Even when one realizes one’s own lack of a personal self and apprehends the specific and general characteristics of the skandhas, dhātus, and āyatanas, this tathāgatagarbha still flourishes. It terminates only through seeing the five dharmas, the three natures, and phenomenal identitylessness....Therefore, Mahāmati, bodhisattva mahāsattvas who have this special goal should purify the tathāgata heart, which is known as "the ālaya-consciousness."

Thus, the fundamental mind (citta) or storehouse consciousness is seen by the Lanka as neither separate from nor united with the defiled latent tendencies. Like a white piece of clothing that remains white underneath but can be dirtied by dust."

=== The mistaken mind and the pure consciousness ===
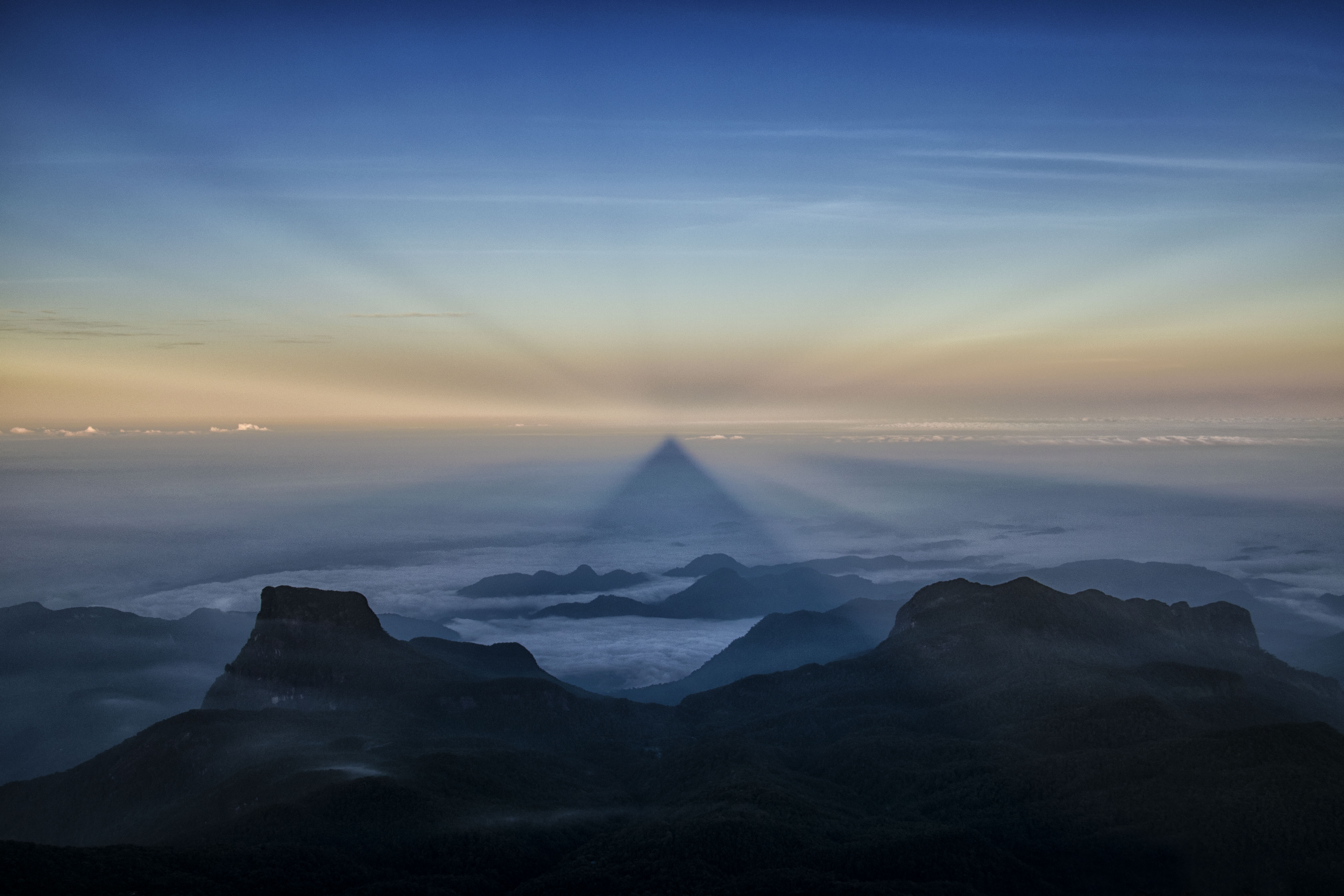
View of the sea from Mount Malaya showing the shadow of the mountain. The simile of the ocean and the waves is used in the sutra to illustrate the relationship between the pure consciousness and the defiled mind.

In some passages, the sutra also seems to divide the storehouse consciousness into two. In one passage these are called "the ultimate ālaya-consciousness and the ālaya of cognizance (vijñapti)," while in another passage, they are called "the true nature of the mind" (which is pure) and "the mind that arises from mistakenness." D.T. Suzuki similarly notes that according to the Laṅkā, the storehouse consciousness has two aspects "the Ālaya as it is in itself", called pāramālaya-vijñāna (the 'incessant' or prabandha aspect), and "the Ālaya as mental representation" (vijñaptir ālaya, the manifested or lakshaṇa aspect). Thus, it is the fluctuating (pravṛitti) aspect of the storehouse consciousness that gets caught up in the discrimination and craving of the manas consciousness, while the primitively pure (prakṛitipuriśuddhi) aspect of the storehouse does not.

Indeed, this pure aspect of the storehouse consciousness is also called "something that has been in existence since the very first" (pūrvadharmasthititā, or paurāṇasthitidharmatā). According to Suzuki, the most common terms for this ultimate reality include: Tathatā ("suchness" or "thusness"), as well as "Satyatā, "the state of being true", Bhūtatā, "the state of being real", Dharmadhātu, "realm of truth", Nirvana, the Permanent (nitya), Sameness (samatā), the One (advaya), Cessation (nirodha), the Formless (animitta), Emptiness (śūnyatā), etc."

In yet another passage, the Lanka speaks of nine forms of consciousnesses (as opposed to the classic eight consciousnesses of Yogacara). This passage may have been the source of Paramārtha’s doctrine of the ninth consciousness, which he termed the *amalavijñāna (pure consciousness). This distinction between an ultimate and a relative storehouse consciousness suggests that buddha-nature is not to be understood as completely equivalent with the storehouse consciousness, but rather is to be seen as the pure nature of the mind that remains once the mind has been purified of all adventitious stains (āgantukamala).

=== Error, wisdom and awakening ===
According to the Laṅkāvatāra suffering and ignorance arises when consciousness engages in discrimination, representation and conceptualization. This error leads to the egoic consciousness, the manas, which considers phenomena as being real and permanent and thus to craving and attachment. The key error of the mind is to consider any phenomena as being something other than mind.

Meanwhile, liberation and awakening (bodhi) arises when discrimination is brought to an end by a deep intuitive and non-conceptual knowledge (jñana) of suchness (tathata). Awakening is the result of the bringing to an end of various activities of consciousness, such as the discrimination of the egoic consciousness (manas) and the latent tendencies of the storehouse consciousness. As Gishin Tokiwa writes, awakening is attained when the discriminating storehouse consciousness "ceases to be the ground and object of the seven vijñanas (consciousnesses)" and when only the pure buddha-nature remains.

This radical reversal of the activities of consciousness is called the turning around of the basis (āśraya-parāvṛtti). To reach this radical transformation of the mind, the bodhisattva must purify his actions and thoughts (through Buddhist practices like ethical discipline and meditation) as well as develop insight into the nature of things (through hearing the teachings and meditating on emptiness).

The knowledge which knows the ultimate truth is a central topic of the Lanka and is variously termed pratyātmāryajñānagati (the state of noble knowledge realized by oneself), svapratyātma (inner self-realization), pratyātmagati (that which is realized by oneself), pratyātmagatigocara (the field realized by oneself) and pratyātma dharmatā (the Dharma nature realized by oneself) in the sutra. Akira Suganuma writes that this "inner wisdom" is "that which all the teachings in the Laṅkāvatārasūtra indicate to us is to realize or accomplish."

According to D.T. Suzuki, this transcendental wisdom (aryajñāna) of the Lanka is "an intuitive understanding which, penetrating through the surface of existence, sees into that which is the reason of everything logically and ontologically" as well as "a fundamental intuition into the truth of Mind-only and constitutes the Buddhist enlightenment." Suzuki notes that aryajñāna is also designated by other terms, such as pravicayabuddhi ("an insight fixed upon the ultimate ground of existence"), svabuddhi (innate understanding), nirābhāsa or anābhāsa (imagelessness), nirvikalpa (beyond discrimination / concepts). The noble wisdom stands in contrast to vikalpabuddhi, discriminative understanding, a relative and conceptual kind of knowledge based on duality and pluralities.

=== Sudden and gradual purification ===
An important passage in the Laṅkāvatāra discusses how the purification of the mind occurs, and the passage states that it can occur gradually as well as suddenly. In this passage, the Lanka states that the purification of the mind can happen "by degrees and not all at once. Like the gooseberry, which ripens by degrees," and immediately after it also states that awakening can also happen "all at once":

Or just as a clear mirror reflects formless images all at once, tathagatas likewise purify the stream of perceptions of beings’ minds by displaying pure, formless, undifferentiated realms all at once. Or just as the sun and moon illuminate images all at once, tathagatas likewise reveal the supreme realm of inconceivable wisdom all at once to those who have freed themselves of the habit-energy and misconceptions that are perceptions of their own minds. Or just as repository consciousness distinguishes such different perceptions of one’s mind as the realms of the body, its possessions, and the world around it all at once, nishyanda buddhas likewise bring beings to maturity in whatever realm they dwell all at once and lead practitioners to reside in Akanishtha Heaven.

This idea was important for the establishment of the East Asian Buddhist doctrine of sudden (dun 頓) enlightenment, an important doctrine which was later widely debated and discussed in many traditions of Mahayana Buddhism, including Chan, Zen and Seon.

=== The Ultimate is beyond words ===
Another important idea found in the Laṅkāvatāra is how the ultimate reality (dharmata) transcends all language and conventional expressions and is free from verbal discrimination (vāgvikalpa). Because ultimate reality is eternal, free from arising and ceasing, and cannot be grasped or cognized (anupalabdhi) the sutra states that Buddhas "do not teach the doctrine that is dependent letters (akṣarapatita)."

Because of this, all teachings in the sutra are not the ultimate, even though they point to the ultimate, like a finger pointing at the Moon. Thus, one should not become attached to the words of the sutra, to the letters (which are only provisional, saṁvṛti) and instead should focus on the ultimate meaning (paramārtha). The Lanka thus states:

As the ignorant grasps the finger-tip (that points to the moon) and does not cognize the moon, so those who cling to the letter do not know my truth.

The Laṅkāvatāra also states that even though Buddhas teach (in conventional fashion), they have never uttered even a single letter or syllable (akṣara):

the Tathagatas neither uttered nor answered even a letter (ekam apy akṣaram), because truths are beyond the letters. It does not mean, however, that (the Tathagatas) never declare what is connected with the benefit (artha) of beings. Depending upon discrimination, they declare anything. If, Mahamati, they do not depend upon discrimination, the scriptures containing all the truths will disappear, and when the scriptures disappear there will be no Buddhas, Sravakas, Pratyekabuddhas and Bodhisattvas; when they disappear, what is to be taught and to whom? For this reason, Mahamati, the Bodhisattva-Mahasattva should not cling to the words or letters in a canonical text...the Bodhisattva-Mahasattva should be in conformity with the meaning (artha-pratiśaraṇa) and not with the letter (vyañjana).

According to Charles Willemen, this teaching of the Laṅkāvatāra is "the basis for Chan’s famous wordless teaching" which sees Chan as being taught "without words" (言说).

== History and editions ==
According to Asanga Tilakaratne, "it is generally believed that the sutra was compiled during 350-400 CE," although "many who have studied the sutra are of opinion that the introductory chapter and the last two chapters were added to the book at a later period." Christian Lindtner argues that some early recension of the Lankavatara influenced the writings of Nagarjuna and Aryadeva (3rd century), basing his conclusion on several close or literal allusions to the sutra in early madhyamaka texts. Thus, the core of the sutra could date to a much earlier time. The Lanka is quoted four times in the Sūtrasamuccaya which has been attributed to Nāgārjuna (but this attribution has also been questioned by some scholars). Lambert Schmithausen has argued that the evidence attributing this text to Nagarjuna is insufficient and that furthermore, a passage from the Lankavatara seems to be a direct quotation from Vasubandhu's Trimsika (4th to 5th century CE). But the issue of the dating of the Lanka is further complicated by the complex nature of Vasubandhu's authorship of various texts and the fact that his Vyākhyāyukti also quotes the Lankavatara.

Some modern scholars like Gishin Tokiwa also surmise that the sutra may have been compiled in Sri Lanka between 411 and 435, during a time when Mahayana Buddhism was popular in the island (at sites like Abhayagiri vihara) and the island also received visits from Chinese pilgrims like Faxian.

Four translations of the Laṅkāvatāra Sūtra were made from Sanskrit into the Chinese language between roughly 420 CE and 704, the earliest being attributed to Dharmarakṣa in the 5th century.

Of these, only three are now extant:

- The first is Taishō Tripiṭaka 670 (楞伽阿跋多羅寶經 Lengqieabaduoluobaojing). This is the earliest edition which was translated by Guṇabhadra in 443 CE, and divided into four fascicles. This edition by Guṇabhadra is said to be the one handed down from the founder of Chan Buddhism, Bodhidharma, to the Second Patriarch, Dazu Huike. This version lacks chapter 1, 9 and 10 from the later versions.
- The second is Taishō # 671 (入楞伽經 Rulengqiejing). This second edition was translated by Bodhiruci in 513 CE, and divided into ten fascicles. This edition is criticized in the imperial preface to the later translation, which says that it contains extra words and sentences mixed in that detract from the original meaning.
- The third is Taishō # 672 (The Mahāyāna Laṅkāvatāra Sūtra; 大乘入楞伽經 Dashengrulengqiejing). This third edition (divided into seven fascicles) was translated by a team headed by Śikṣānanda and it was completed in 704 CE. This final translation was made at the behest of Empress Wu Zetian, after Śikṣānanda had completed his 80-fascicle translation of the Avataṃsaka Sūtra. This translation is said to have employed five separate Sanskrit editions for accuracy. The Huayan scholar and Sanskritist Fazang was also involved in this translation effort. Before the final edits to this version had been made, Śikṣānanda returned to India, and another Indian monk called Mitrasena came to China who had studied the Buddhist sutras for 25 years in India, and who knew the Laṅkāvatāra Sūtra. Fazang and Mitrasena were given the task of revising and completing the translation.

In addition to these Chinese translations, there are also two Tibetan translations, and a version of the Sanskrit was preserved in Nepal. One Tibetan translation is derived from the Sanskrit original, and the other is likely a translation of Guṇabhadra's Chinese into Tibetan.

Nanjo Bunyu prepared a critical edition of the Sanskrit in 1923 based on four manuscripts from the Nepalese recension, among other sources.

According to Gishin Tokiwa, the Sanskrit edition and Sikṣānanda's translation contain various additions and errors. Tokiwa considers that "the Gunabhadra version conveys the earliest, original Sanskrit text-form whereas the two other Chinese versions as well as the extant Sanskrit manuscripts that include the Nanjio-edition did not go through any kind of appropriate text-critique." Takasaki Jikido likewise argued that the Gunabhadra edition was the closest version available to the early Sanskrit edition.

Gishin Tokiwa has also published a reconstructed Sanskrit edition based on the extant Sanskrit manuscript and the Gunabhadra translation.

The earliest translations of the Laṅkāvatāra Sūtra are significantly shorter than later ones, which D.T. Suzuki interprets as suggesting that additions were made to the text over time. The first and last chapters (which connect the text with Ravana, the villain of the Ramayana, and adds a dharani) are missing from the earliest translation, and the prose of the first chapter in later translations does not agree with the verse-form provided alongside it. Suzuki also suggests that the chapter on meat eating, where the Theravada 'thrice clean' practice is criticized, may be a later edition based on its different tone and content from the rest of the text. Based on the text's lack of organization, varying and sometimes irrelevant chapter headings, and expansion over time, Suzuki suggests that it may have originated as a collection of individual passages summarizing essential Mahayana doctrines, which were later shaped into a narrative.

== Analysis and commentaries ==
According to Takasaki Jikido, because of this mosaic like character of the text, the best way to analyze the scripture has been "to divide the whole text into small parts or sections according to their subjects." The first commentator to attempt this was the Japanese author Kokan Shiren, who in the 14th century divided the text into 86 sections with titles. Most of these sections (but not all) include a prose part followed by a verse section that recapitulates the prose teaching.

Chandrakirti argued that the text needed to be interpreted, and that it was "not to be understood as a negation of form."

=== Indian commentaries ===
There are two traditional Indian commentaries preserved in Tibetan translations:

- Jñānaśrībhadra (11th century), ʼPhags pa lang kar gshegs paʼi ʼgrel pa (*Āryalaṅkāvatāravṛtti) P #5519; D #4018
- Jñānavajra (12th century), ʼPhags pa lang kar gshegs pa zhes bya ba theg pa chen poʼi mdoʼi ʼgrel pa de bzhin gshegs paʼi snying poʼi rgyan zhes bya ba (*Āryalaṅkāvatāranāmamahāyānasūtravṛtti Tathāgatahṛdayālaṃkāra nāma)

These commentaries mainly comment on the sutra by relying on the epistemological tradition of Dharmakīrti. Jñānavajra's commentary presents a unique Yogācāra-Svātantrika-Madhyamaka perspective which was termed ‘cognitive centrism’ (vijñaptimadhyama, rnam rig dbu ma) and he also heavily relies on the works of Kamalaśīla, particularly the Madhyamakāloka. In this commentary, he also critiques the alīkākāravada view of Yogacara philosophy. According to H. Hadano, Jñānavajra's commentary "takes the standpoint that the myriad pure and defiled dharmas are all manifestations of mind (citta), that they are not different to mind, and that they are mind-itself, in other words, the standpoint of the Rnam par rig pa tsam gyi dbu ma (vijñapti-mātrika-mādhyamika) which considers saṃvṛtti and paramārtha as two sides of the same coin, and discards duality."

=== East Asian commentaries ===
There are also numerous East Asian Buddhist commentaries on the Lanka, like the commentaries by Huayan Patriarchs Zhiyan and Fazang. According to John Jorgensen, Fazang's commentary explains ten key themes he finds in the sutra: "1. the emptiness and existence in causation; 2.the fundamental and derived in the vijñānas; 3. the true and false in the substance of the vijñānas; 4. the seeds of the fundamental vijñāna; 5. the universality of the Buddha-nature; 6. the turning around of the minds of the two vehicle (followers); 7. the opening and closing of the stages of practice; 8. the non-obstruction of barrier and cure; 9. the freedom of pro and contrary; and 10. the eternal persistence of the Buddha-result." Fazang considered the Lankāvatāra to be one of the definitive sutras which taught the theme (zong) of "the attribute of reality" which teaches that consciousness is produced by buddha-nature.

The Lanka is also quoted and commented on in the Bodhidharma Anthology (i.e. the Putidamo sixing lun), an important text of early Chan Buddhism that contains material attributed to Bodhidharma and his students. Jorgensen also states that "there is evidence that commentaries on the Lankāvatāra Sūtra attributed to Bodhidharma reached Japan, some at least by 736." This "Bodhidharma commentary...has to date from between 445 and 740" and "shares much in common with the theories of Jingying Huiyuan (523-592) of the Southern Dilun Faction, who quoted the Lankāvatāra Sūtra as one of his authorities."

Various commentaries were written during the Song dynasty. Baochen, writing in the Northern Song dynasty era, also wrote a long commentary to the Lanka which was influenced by the Awakening of Faith and Huayan. Another commentary is that of the Chan monk Zhengshou (1146-1208) of the Xuedou lineage which provides a Chan perspective on the Lanka. The Tiantai monk Shanyue (1149-1241), also wrote a commentary to the Lanka.

One of the most important Japanese commentaries is Kokan Shiren’s (1278-1346) Treatise on the Essence of the Buddha’s Words (Butsugoshinron 佛語心論), in 18 scrolls 巻, which was written in 1324. He ignores most Song dynasty commentaries, and only cites Zhiyan's early commentary. Kokan's commentary includes extensive polemics against Tendai Buddhism and Zhanran's views on the Lankavatara. Kokan attempts to show that Zen is a superior and separate transmission of the Buddha’s realization which stands entirely apart from all other Buddhist teaching, doctrine and scriptures and abandons all relative discourse, all "words and letters." Kokan draws on the teachings of the Lankavatara on the perfect nature taught by the Dharmakaya to claim that Zen is a unique transmission of the realization of this perfect nature and that this is what Bodhidharma's transmission of “seeing the nature and completing Buddhahood” means. Another Japanese commentary was published in 1687 by Tokugan Yoson.

During the Ming dynasty, various commentaries were written, such as those by the Chan-Pure Land-Tiantai master Ouyi Zhixu (including 楞伽阿跋多羅寶經義疏, Commentary on the Meanings of the Laṅkāvatāra Jewel Sūtra), the Huayan master Tongrun's Lengqie jing hezhe (楞伽經合轍) and Jiaohong's (焦竑 1540–1620) Lengqie jing jing jie ping lin (楞伽經精解評林, Forest of Comments of Detailed Interpretations on Lankavatara Sutra).

== English translations ==
The following are English translations of the Lankavatara sutra.

From the Sanskrit edition:

- Thomas Cleary. The Lankavatara Sutra. The Heart of Buddhism. Translated from the original Sanskrit. 2012.

From the four-fascicle Chinese edition of Gunabhadra and the Sanskrit (restored on the basis of Gunabhadra's translation):

- Gishin Tokiwa. Lankavatara Sutram. A Jewel Scripture of Mahayana Thought and Practice. A study of the Four-Fascicle Lankavatara Ratna Sutram. In a Set of Four Texts: A Sanskrit Restoration, English and Japanese Translations with Introduction, and the Collated Gunabhadra Chinese Version with Japanese Reading. Hanazono University, Kyoto. Printed by the Meibunsha Printing Co. Lts., Kyoto, Japan, 2003.
- Red Pine, Laṅkāvatāra Sūtra: Translation and Commentary. Berkeley, CA: Counterpoint, 2012. ISBN 978-1-58243-791-0

The Red Pine translation is a translation of the four-fascicle Chinese edition of Gunabhadra with some additions from the Śikṣānanda (652-710 CE) and Bodhiruchi translations (like the first "Ravana" introductory chapter). It also omits the "Sagāthakam", the last chapter in the long version of the sutra, which is considered by many scholars to be a later addition.

Composite translations:

- Daisetz Teitaro Suzuki. The Lankavatara Sutra: A Mahayana Text Translated for the first time from the original Sanskrit. London: Routledge & Kegan Paul Ltd., 1932 (originally published); 1956 (reprint). ISBN 0-87773-702-9.

Suzuki's translation, though sub-titled as a translation from the Sanskrit, actually also draws on the Chinese translations along with the Sanskrit edition of Bunyu Nanjo (1923).

== See also ==
- Ghanavyūha Sūtra, a sutra with similar themes
- Diamond sutra, another sutra important to Chan/Zen Buddhism
- Heart Sutra
- Mahāvaṃsa, includes a Sinhalese legend of the Buddha visiting the island of Lanka

== Bibliography ==
- Lindtner, Christian (1992). The Lankavatarasutra in Early Indian Madhyamaka Literature, Copenhagen. Asiatische Studien, XLV, 1, pp. 244–279.
- Nanjio, Bunyiu. ed. (1923). The Laṅkāvatāra sūtra, Kyoto: Otani University Press, pp. VIII-IX (Skt. edition)
- Sutton, Florin G. (1991). Existence and enlightenment in the Laṅkāvatāra-sūtra: a study in the ontology and epistemology of the Yogācāra school of Mahāyāna Buddhism, Albany, NY : State Univ. of New York Press, ISBN 0-7914-0172-3
- Suzuki, D. T. (1930). Studies in the Lankavatara Sutra. Reprint: Munshiram Manoharlal Publishers, New Delhi 1998, ISBN 81-215-0833-9
- Suzuki, D. T. (2003). The Lankavatara Sutra, An Epitomized Version, Consortium Book Sales & Dist, ISBN 0-9726357-4-2
