= Bhavanga =

Bhavaṅga (Pali, "ground of becoming", "condition for existence"), also bhavanga-sota and bhavanga-citta is a passive mode of intentional consciousness (citta) described in the Abhidhamma of Theravada Buddhism. It is also a mental process which conditions the next mental process at the moment of death and rebirth. It is an exclusively Theravada doctrine that differs from Sarvastivadin and Sautrantika theories of mind, and has been compared to the Mahayana concept of store-consciousness.

== Classical definition and development ==
The term does not occur in the Nikayas, though the Theravada tradition identifies it with one that does; the phenomenon described as "luminous mind." The Theravāda Abhidhamma tradition asserts that it is the bhavanga that motivates one to seek nibbana. It is first found in the Patthana, part of the Theravada Abhidhamma Pitaka. The word bhavaṅga is also found in the Nettipakaraṇa, Milindapañha, and Petakopadesa. The nature of bhavaṅga is also discussed in the Visuddhimagga and Atthasālinī of Buddhaghosa, as well as in Buddhadatta’s Abhidhammāvatāra and Anuruddha’s Abhidhammatthasaṅgaha.

According to Rupert Gethin,

"bhavaṅga is the state in which the mind is said to rest when no active consciousness process is occurring: thus bhavaṅga is one’s state of mind when nothing appears to be going on, such as when one is in a state of deep dreamless sleep, and also momentarily between each active consciousness process."

Since the bhavaṅga occurs when there is no active cognitive processes going on, the bhavaṅga and the forms of manifest cognitive awareness are mutually exclusive according to Waldron: "the former ceases when the latter arises."

Furthermore, Gethin argues that the bhavaṅga according to Pali Theravada texts is a "mental province that defines the essential character and capabilities of a given being" which exerts "some kind of influence on conscious mental states." In the Visuddhimagga, Buddhaghosa mentions that “mental cognition arises dependent on bhavanga-mind, a mental object [dhamma], and attention”, thus bhavanga is a condition for the arising of cognitive awareness.

A new being's first moment of bhavaṅga (called re-linking consciousness) is also directly conditioned by the last full conscious process of the immediately preceding life, a state of bhavaṅga called “falling away” or “death consciousness” (cuti-citta). Hence, this concept helps provide an account of psychological continuity. Moreover, according to Gethin, this last conscious moment before death "operates in principle as a kind of summing up of that life; whatever has been most significant in that life will tend to come before the mind. Moreover, what comes before the mind at this point is what will play the principal role in determining the nature of the subsequent rebirth."

L. S. Cousins notes that the bhavaṅga carries an individual's tendencies:

We may interpret its continuance throughout life as the natural mode to which the mind continually reverts as indicating its role of ‘carrying’ the essential features of the individual – those tendencies which remain apparently unchanged in a particular individual throughout a given life. … Evidently it is seen either as storing past experience or as having direct access to the past (or future). In the first case we might understand it as an unconscious storehouse. The mind as a whole is certainly envisaged as accumulating tendencies, but it is not clear how far this would include experiences.

== Modern interpretations ==
According to Rupert Gethin, modern discussions of bhavaṅga have tended towards either of two interpretations: "they have either tended to see bhavaṅga as something akin to the contemporary idea of the unconscious; or they have tended to see bhavaṅga as a kind of mental blank."

Theravadins such as Nyanatiloka Thera have departed from traditional descriptions of the bhavanga, broadening the scope of the concept. Nyanatiloka Thera suggests that the bhavanga can be used to explain continuity of the personality in a lifetime, but that the nervous system could also be the register in which sense impressions are stored. Nyanatiloka sees the bhavanga as a type of unconscious mental process:

“Herein since time immemorial, all impressions and experiences are, as it were, stored up or, better said, are functioning but concealed as such to full consciousness from where however they occasionally emerge as subconscious phenomena and approach the threshold of full consciousness.”

Other scholars like Steven Collins imply that this is a blank state of mind, empty with no content.

In the Theravada Abhidhamma, both conceptualizing and mental consciousness normally arise conditioned by other mental states. However, they also have an unspecified kind of rūpa (matter, form) as "support condition" and "basis." Peter Harvey finds that incorporating this physical basis more fully may answer certain questions that the Abhidhamma does not address.

One contemporary Theravada teacher, Ajahn Brahm, claims that bhavaṅga is an incorrect, and unhelpful interpretation of the Buddha's teaching on dependent origination.
