= Eight Consciousnesses =

Types of consciousness in Mahayana Buddhism

The Eight Consciousnesses (Skt. aṣṭa vijñānakāyāḥ) are a classification developed in the tradition of the Yogācāra school of Mahayana Buddhism. They enumerate the five sense consciousnesses, supplemented by the mental consciousness (manovijñāna), the defiled mental consciousness (kliṣṭamanovijñāna), and finally the fundamental store-house consciousness (ālāyavijñāna), which is the basis of the other seven. This eighth consciousness is said to store the impressions (vāsanāḥ) of previous experiences, which form the seeds (bīja) of future karma in this life and in the next after rebirth.

== Eightfold network of primary consciousnesses ==
All surviving schools of Buddhist thought accept – "in common" – the existence of the first six primary consciousnesses (Sanskrit: vijñāna, Tibetan: རྣམ་ཤེས་, Wylie: rnam-shes). The internally coherent Yogācāra school associated with Maitreya, Asaṅga, and Vasubandhu, however, uniquely – or "uncommonly" – also posits the existence of two additional primary consciousnesses, kliṣṭamanovijñāna and ālayavijñāna, in order to explain the workings of karma. The first six of these primary consciousnesses comprise the five sensory faculties together with mental consciousness, which is counted as the sixth. The kliṣṭamanovijñāna is described as an afflicted consciousness, which exhibits an ongoing subtle clinging to self that provides the basis for the ego and disturbing emotions. Based on the Kangyur, the Kagyu scholar 3rd Karmapa, Rangjung Dorje additionally points out that it must also have an immediate aspect, with the power to give rise to the six primary consciousnesses.

According to Gareth Sparham,

The ālaya-vijñāna doctrine arose on the Indian subcontinent about one thousand years before Tsong kha pa. It gained its place in a distinctly Yogācāra system over a period of some three hundred years stretching from 100 to 400 C.E., culminating in the Mahāyānasaṃgraha, a short text by Asaṅga (circa 350), setting out a systematic presentation of the ālaya-vijñāna doctrine developed over the previous centuries. It is the doctrine found in this text in particular that Tsong kha pa, in his Ocean of Eloquence, treats as having been revealed in toto by the Buddha and transmitted to suffering humanity through the Yogācāra founding saints (Tib. shing rta srol byed): Maitreya[-nātha], Asaṅga, and Vasubandhu.

While some noteworthy modern scholars of the Gelug tradition (which was founded by Tsongkhapa's reforms to Atisha's Kadam school) assert that the ālāyavijñāna is posited only in the Yogācāra philosophical tenet system, all non-Gelug schools of Tibetan buddhism maintain that the ālāyavijñāna is accepted by the various Madhyamaka schools, as well. The Yogācāra eightfold network of primary consciousnesses – aṣṭavijñānāni in Sanskrit (from compounding aṣṭa, "eight", with vijñānāni, the plural of vijñāna "consciousnesses"), or Tibetan: རྣམ་ཤེས་ཚོགས་བརྒྱད་, Wylie: rnam-shes tshogs-brgyad – is roughly sketched out in the following table.

The Eightfold Network of Primary Consciousnesses
Subgroups	Name (Note: Sanskrit nama = Tibetan: མིང་, Wylie: ming = English "name".) of Consciousness (Note: Sanskrit vijñāna = Tibetan: རྣམ་ཤེས་, Wylie: rnam-shes = English "consciousness".)				Associated Nonstatic Phænomena (Note: Sanskrit anitya = Tibetan: མི་རྟག་པ་, Wylie: mi-rtag-pa = English "nonstatic phænomenon".) in terms of Three Circles of Action (Note: Tibetan: འཁོར་ལོ་གསུམ་, Wylie: 'khor-lo gsum = English "three circles" of action.)		
Subgroups	English	Sanskrit	Tibetan	Chinese	Cognitive Object (Note: Sanskrit rupa = Tibetan: གཟུགས་, Wylie: gzugs = English "form(s) of physical phænomena".)	Type of Cognition (Note: Tibetan: ཤེས་པ་, Wylie: shes-pa = English "cognition".)	Cognitive Sensor (Note: Sanskrit indriya = Tibetan: དབང་པོ་, Wylie: dbang-po = English "cognitive sensor".)
I. – VI. Each of these Six Common Consciousnesses – referred to in Sanskrit as pravṛttivijñānāni (Note: Sanskrit pravṛtti-vijñāna refers to the first six consciousnesses which derive from direct sensory (including mental) cognition.) – are posited on the basis of valid straightforward cognition, (Note: Sanskrit pratyakshapramana = Tibetan: མངོན་སུམ་ཚད་མ་, Wylie: mngon-sum tshad-ma = English "valid straightforward cognition".) on any individual practitioner's part, of sensory data input experienced solely by means of their bodily sense faculties. The derivation of this particular dual classification schema for these first six, so-called "common" consciousnesses has its origins in the first four Nikāyas of the Sutta Pitaka – the second division of the Tipitaka in the Pali Canon – as first committed to writing during the Theravada school's fourth council at Sri Lanka in 83 (BCE). Both individually and collectively: these first six, so-called "common" consciousnesses are posited – in common –by all surviving buddhist tenet systems.
	I. Eye Consciousness	cakṣurvijñāna	༡ Tibetan: མིག་གི་རྣམ་ཤེས་, Wylie: mig-gi rnam-shes	眼識	Sight(s)	Seeing	Eyes
	II. Ear Consciousness	śrotravijñāna	༢ Tibetan: རྣའི་རྣམ་ཤེས་, Wylie: rna'i rnam-shes	耳識	Sound(s)	Hearing	Ears
	III. Nose Consciousness	ghrāṇavijñāna	༣ Tibetan: སྣའི་རྣམ་ཤེས་, Wylie: sna'i rnam-shes	鼻識	Smell(s)	Smell	Nose
	IV. Tongue Consciousness	jihvāvijñāna	༤ Tibetan: ལྕེའི་རྣམ་ཤེས་, Wylie: lce'i rnam-shes	舌識	Taste(s)	Taste	Tongue
	V. Body Consciousness	kāyavijñāna	༥ Tibetan: ལུས་ཀྱི་རྣམ་ཤེས་, Wylie: lus-kyi rnam-shes	身識	Feeling(s)	Touch	Body
	VI. Mental Consciousness (Note: Sanskrit mano-vijñāna = Tibetan: ཡིད་ཀྱི་རྣམ་ཤེས་, Wylie: yid-kyi rnam-shes = English "mental consciousness".)	manovijñāna	༦ Tibetan: ཡིད་ཀྱི་རྣམ་ཤེས་, Wylie: yid-kyi rnam-shes	意識	Thought(s)	Ideation	Mind
VII. This Seventh Consciousness, posited on the basis of straightforward cognition in combination with inferential cognition, (Note: Sanskrit anumana = Tibetan: རྗེས་དཔག་, Wylie: rjes-dpag = English "inferential cognition".) is asserted, uncommonly, in Yogācāra.	VII. Deluded awareness (Note: Tibetan: ཉོན་ཡིད་་, Wylie: nyon-yid = English "deluded awareness".)	manas, kliṣṭa-manas, kliṣṭamanovijñāna,	༧ Tibetan: ཉོན་ཡིད་རྣམ་ཤེས་, Wylie: nyon-yid rnam-shes	末那識	The eighth consciousness (which it grasps to as a self)	Disturbing emotion or attitude (Skt.: kleśa) (Note: Sanskrit klesha = Tibetan: ཉོན་མོངས་, Wylie: nyon-mongs = English "disturbing emotion or attitude" – also called "moving mind", or mind monkey, in some Chinese and Japanese schools.)	Mind
VIII. This Eighth Consciousness, posited on the basis of inferential cognition, is asserted, uncommonly, in Yogācāra.	VIII. "Storehouse" or "repository" consciousness (Note: Sanskrit ālayavijñāna (from compounding ālaya – "abode" or dwelling", with vijñāna, or "consciousness") = Tibetan: ཀུན་གཞི་རྣམ་ཤེས་, Wylie: kun-gzhi rnam-shes = Chinese 阿賴耶識 = English "All-encompassing foundation consciousness" = Japanese: arayashiki.)	ālāyavijñāna, Also known as the appropriating consciousness (ādānavijñāna), the basic consciousness (mūla-vijñāna), and the "mind which has all the seeds" (sarvabījakam cittam).	༨ Tibetan: ཀུན་གཞི་རྣམ་ཤེས་, Wylie: kun-gzhi rnam-shes	藏識, 種子識, 阿賴耶識, or 本識	The surrounding world, the "receptacle" or "container" (bhājana) world	Reflexive awareness (Note: Tibetan: རང་རིག་, Wylie: rang-rig = English "reflexive awareness" in non-Gelug presentations of Sautrantika and Chittamatra tenet systems.)	Mind

== Origins and development ==
=== Early Buddhist texts ===
The first five sense-consciousnesses along with the sixth consciousness are identified in the Suttapiṭaka, especially in the Sabbasutta, Saṃyuttanikāya 35.23:

"Monks, I will teach you the All. Listen & pay close attention. I will speak."

"As you say, lord," the monks responded.

The Blessed One said, "What is the All? Simply the eye & forms, ear & sounds, nose & aromas, tongue & flavors, body & tactile sensations, intellect & ideas. This, monks, is called the All. [1] Anyone who would say, 'Repudiating this All, I will describe another,' if questioned on what exactly might be the grounds for his statement, would be unable to explain, and furthermore, would be put to grief. Why? Because it lies beyond range."

The early Buddhist texts speak of anusayā (Sanskrit: anuśayāḥ), the "underlying tendencies" or "latent dispositions" which keep beings caught in the circle of samsara. These potential tendencies are generally seen as unconscious processes which "lie beneath" our everyday consciousness, and according to Waldron "they represent the potential, the tendency, for cognitive and emotional afflictions (Pali: kilesā, Sanskrit: kleśāḥ) to arise".

==== Sautrāntika and Theravāda theories ====
The Sautrāntika school of Buddhism, which relied closely on the sutras, developed a theory of seeds (bīja, 種子) in the mindstream (cittasaṃtāna, 心相續, lit. "mind-character-continuity") to explain how karma and the latent dispositions continued throughout life and rebirth. This theory later developed into the alayavijñana view.

The Theravāda theory of the bhavaṅga may also be a forerunner of the ālāyavijñana theory. Vasubandhu cites the bhavaṅgavijñāna of the Sinhalese school (Tāmraparṇīyanikāya) as a forerunner of the ālāyavijñāna. The Theravadin theory is also mentioned by Xuánzàng.

=== Yogācāra ===
The texts of the Yogācāra school gives a detailed explanation of the workings of the mind and the way it constructs the reality we experience. It is "meant to be an explanation of experience, rather than a system of ontology". The theory of the ālāyavijñana and the other consciousnesses developed out of a need to work out various issues in Buddhist Abhidharma thought. According to Lambert Schmithausen, the first mention of the concept occurs in the Yogācārabhumiśāstra, which posits a basal consciousness that contains seeds for future cognitive processes. It is also described in the Saṃdhinirmocanasūtra and in the Mahāyānasaṃgraha of Asaṅga.

Vasubandhu is considered to be the systematizer of Yogācāra thought. Vasubandhu used the concept of the six consciousnesses, on which he elaborated in the Triṃśikaikākārikā (Treatise in Thirty Stanzas).

== Vijñānāni ==
According to the traditional interpretation, Vasubandhu states that there are eight consciousnesses (vijñānāni, singular: vijñāna):

- Five sense-consciousnesses,
- Mind (perception),
- Manas (self-consciousness),
- Storehouse-consciousness.

According to Kalupahana, this classification of eight consciousnesses is based on a misunderstanding of Vasubandhu's Triṃśikaikākārikā by later adherents. (Note: Kalupahana: "The above explanation of alaya-vijnana makes it very different from that found in the Lankavatara. The latter assumes alaya to be the eight consciousness, giving the impression that it represents a totally distinct category. Vasubandhu does not refer to it as the eight, even though his later disciples like Sthiramati and Hsuan Tsang constantly refer to it as such".)

=== Ālayavijñāna ===
The ālayavijñāna (Japanese: 阿頼耶識 arayashiki, Vietnamese: A-lại-da thức), or the "All-encompassing foundation consciousness", forms the "base-consciousness" (mūlavijñāna) or "causal consciousness". According to the traditional interpretation, the other seven consciousnesses are "evolving" or "transforming" consciousnesses originating in this base-consciousness. The store-house consciousness accumulates all potential energy as seeds (bīja) for the mental (nāma) and physical (rūpa) manifestation of one's existence (nāmarūpa). It is the storehouse-consciousness which induces rebirth, causing the origination of a new existence.

==== Role ====
The ālayavijñāna is also described in the Saṃdhinirmocanasūtra as the "mind which has all the seeds" (sarvabījakam cittam) which enters the womb and develops based on two forms of appropriation or attachment (upādāna); to the material sense faculties, and to predispositions (vāsanāḥ) towards conceptual proliferations (prapañca). The Saṃdhinirmocanasūtra also defines it in varying ways:

This consciousness is also called the appropriating consciousness ("adana-vijñana") because the body is grasped and appropriated by it.

It is also called the "alaya-vijñana" because it dwells in and attaches to this body in a common destiny ("ekayogakṣema-arthena").

It is also called mind ("citta") because it is heaped up and accumulated by [the six cognitive objects, i.e.:] visual forms, sounds, smells, flavors, tangibles and dharmas.

In a seemingly innovative move, the Saṃdhinirmocanasūtra states that the alayavijñana is always active subliminally and occurs simultaneously with, "supported by and depending upon" the six sense consciousnesses.

According to Asanga's Mahāyānasaṃgraha, the alayavijñana is taught by other Buddhist schools by different names. He states that the alaya is what the Mahasamghikas call the "root-consciousness" (mulavijñana), what the Mahīśāsakas call "the aggregate which lasts as long as samsara" (asaṃsārikaskandha) and what the Sthaviras call the bhavaṅga.

==== Rebirth and purification ====
The store-house consciousness receives impressions from all functions of the other consciousnesses, and retains them as potential energy, bīja or "seeds", for their further manifestations and activities. Since it serves as the container for all experiential impressions it is also called the "seed consciousness" (種子識) or container consciousness.

According to Yogācāra teachings, the seeds stored in the store consciousness of sentient beings are not pure. (Note: Each being has his own one and only, formless and no-place-to-abide store-house consciousness. Our "being" is created by our own store-consciousness, according to the karma seeds stored in it. In "coming and going" we definitely do not own the "no-coming and no-going" store-house consciousness, rather we are owned by it. Just as a human image shown in a monitor can never be described as lasting for any instant, since "he" is just the production of electron currents of data stored and flow from the hard disk of the computer, so do seed-currents drain from the store-consciousness, never last from one moment to the next.)

The store consciousness, while being originally immaculate in itself, contains a "mysterious mixture of purity and defilement, good and evil". Because of this mixture the transformation of consciousness from defilement to purity can take place and awakening is possible.

Through the process of purification the dharma practitioner can become an Arhat, when the four defilements of the mental functions (Note: the mental functions (心所法),: self-delusion (我癡), self-view (我見), egotism (我慢), and self-love (我愛)) of the manas-consciousness are purified. (Note: By then the polluted mental functions of the first six consciousnesses would have been cleansed. The seventh or the manas-consciousness determines whether or not the seeds and the contentdrain from the alaya-vijnana breaks through, becoming a "function" to be perceived by us in the mental or physical world.) (Note: In contrast to an Arhat, a Buddha is one with all his seeds stored in the eighth Seed consciousness. Cleansed and substituted, bad for good, one for one, his polluted-seeds-containing eighth consciousness (Alaya Consciousness) becomes an all-seeds-purified eighth consciousness (Pure consciousness 無垢識 ), and he becomes a Buddha.)

==== Tathagata-garbha thought ====
According to the Laṅkāvatārasūtra and the schools of Chan and Zen Buddhism, the ālāyavijñāna is identical with the tathāgatagarbha (Note: The womb or matrix of the Thus-come-one, the Buddha), and is fundamentally pure.

The equation of ālāyavijñāna and tathāgatagarbha was contested. It was seen as "something akin to the Hindu notions of ātman (permanent, invariant self) and prakṛti (primordial substrative nature from which all mental, emotional and physical things evolve)." According to Dan Lusthaus, the critique led by the end of the eighth century to the rise of the logico-epistemic tradition of Yogācāra and a hybrid school combining Tathāgatagarbha thought with basic Yogācāra doctrines:

The logico-epistemological wing in part sidestepped the critique by using the term citta-santāna, "mind-stream", instead of ālaya-vijñāna, for what amounted to roughly the same idea. It was easier to deny that a "stream" represented a reified self. On the other hand, the Tathāgatagarbha hybrid school was no stranger to the charge of smuggling notions of selfhood into its doctrines, since, for example, it explicitly defined the tathāgatagarbha as "permanent, pleasurable, self, and pure (nitya, sukha, ātman, śuddha)". Many Tathāgatagarbha texts, in fact, argue for the acceptance of selfhood (ātman) as a sign of higher accomplishment. The hybrid school attempted to conflate tathāgatagarbha with the ālaya-vijñāna.

=== Transformations of consciousness ===
The traditional interpretation of the eight consciousnesses may be discarded on the ground of a reinterpretation of Vasubandhu's works. According to Kalupahana, instead of positing such an consciousnesses, the Triṃśikaikākārikā describes the transformations of this consciousness:

Taking vipaka, manana and vijnapti as three different kinds of functions, rather than characteristics, and understanding vijnana itself as a function (vijnanatiti vijnanam), Vasubandhu seems to be avoiding any form of substantialist thinking in relation to consciousness.

These transformations are threefold:

Whatever, indeed, is the variety of ideas of self and elements that prevails, it occurs in the transformation of consciousness. Such transformation is threefold, [namely,]

The first transformation results in the ālāya:

the resultant, what is called mentation, as well as the concept of the object. Herein, the consciousness called alaya, with all its seeds, is the resultant.

The ālāyavijñāna therefore is not an eighth consciousness, but the resultant of the transformation of consciousness:

Instead of being a completely distinct category, alaya-vijnana merely represents the normal flow of the stream of consciousness uninterrupted by the appearance of reflective self-awareness. It is no more than the unbroken stream of consciousness called the life-process by the Buddha. It is the cognitive process, containing both emotive and co-native aspects of human experience, but without the enlarged egoistic emotions and dogmatic graspings characteristic of the next two transformations.

The second transformation is manana, self-consciousness or "Self-view, self-confusion, self-esteem and self-love". According to the Lankavatara and later interpreters it is the seventh consciousness. It is "thinking" about the various perceptions occurring in the stream of consciousness". The alaya is defiled by this self-interest;

[I]t can be purified by adopting a non-substantialist (anatman) perspective and thereby allowing the alaya-part (i.e. attachment) to dissipate, leaving consciousness or the function of being intact.

The third transformation is viṣayavijñapti, the "concept of the object". In this transformation the concept of objects is created. By creating these concepts human beings become "susceptible to grasping after the object":

Vasubandhu is critical of the third transformation, not because it relates to the conception of an object, but because it generates grasping after a "real object" (sad artha), even when it is no more than a conception (vijnapti) that combines experience and reflection.

A similar perspective is give by Walpola Rahula. According to Walpola Rahula, all the elements of the Yogācāra storehouse-consciousness are already found in the Pāli Canon. He writes that the three layers of the mind (citta, manas, and vijñāna) as presented by Asaṅga are also mentioned in the Pāli Canon:

Thus we can see that 'Vijñāna' represents the simple reaction or response of the sense organs when they come in contact with external objects. This is the uppermost or superficial aspect or layer of the 'Vijñāna-skandha'. 'Manas' represents the aspect of its mental functioning, thinking, reasoning, conceiving ideas, etc. 'Citta' which is here called 'Ālayavijñāna', represents the deepest, finest and subtlest aspect or layer of the Aggregate of consciousness. It contains all the traces or impressions of the past actions and all good and bad future possibilities.

== Understanding in Buddhism ==
=== China ===
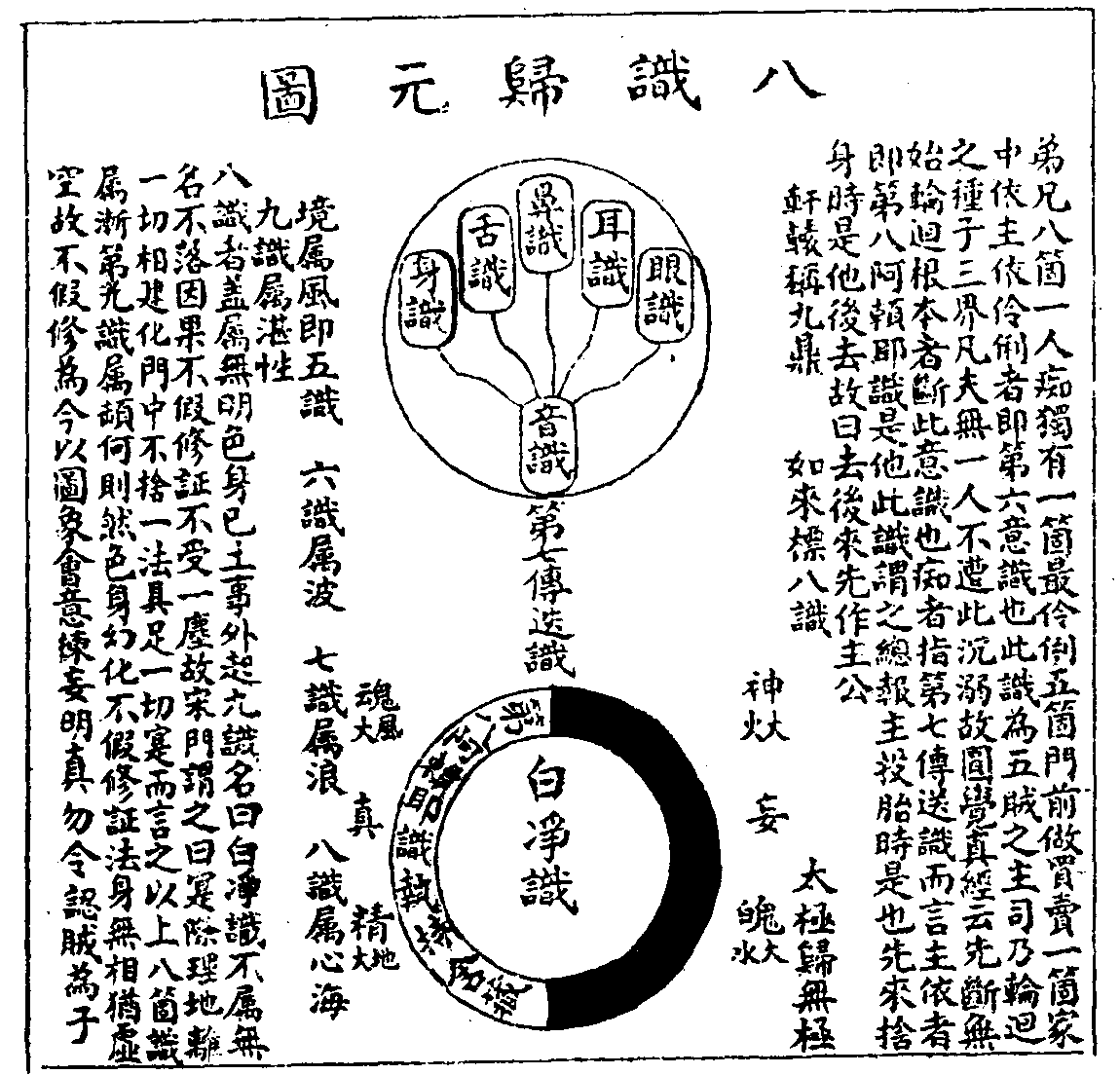
Eight Consciousnesses Return to the Origin 八識歸元圖, 1615 Xingming guizhi

==== Fǎxiàng and Huayan ====
According to Thomas McEvilley, although Vasubandhu had postulated numerous ālāya-vijñāna-s, a separate one for each individual person in the parakalpita, this multiplicity was later eliminated in the Faxiang and Huayan metaphysics. (Note: See also Buddha-nature#Popularisation in Chinese Buddhism) These schools inculcated instead the doctrine of a single universal and eternal ālaya-vijñāna. This exalted enstatement of the ālāyavijñāna is described in the Fǎxiàng as "primordial unity".

Thomas McEvilley further argues that the presentation of the three natures by Vasubandhu is consistent with the Neo-platonist views of Plotinus and his universal 'One', 'Mind', and 'Soul'.

==== Chán ====
A core teaching of Chan/Zen Buddhism describes the transformation of the Eight Consciousnesses into the Four Wisdoms. (Note: It is found in Chapter 7 of the Platform Sutra of the Sixth Ancestor Zen Master Huineng and other Zen masters, such as Hakuin Ekaku, in his work titled Keiso Dokuqui, and Xuyun, in his work titled Daily Lectures at Two Ch'an Weeks, Week 1, Fourth Day.) In this teaching, Buddhist practice is to turn the light of awareness around, from misconceptions regarding the nature of reality as being external, to kenshō, "directly see one's own nature".. Thus the Eighth Consciousness is transformed into the Great Perfect Mirror Wisdom, the Seventh Consciousness into the Equality (Universal Nature) Wisdom, the Sixth Consciousness into the Profound Observing Wisdom, and First to Fifth Consciousnesses into the All Performing (Perfection of Action) Wisdom.

=== Korea ===
The Interpenetration (通達) and Essence-Function (體用) of Wonhyo (元曉) is described in the Treatise on Awakening Mahāyāna Faith (大乘起信論, Mahāyānaśraddhotpādaśāstra, AMF in the excerpt below):

The author of the AMF was deeply concerned with the question of the respective origins of ignorance and enlightenment. If enlightenment is originally existent, how do we become submerged in ignorance? If ignorance is originally existent, how is it possible to overcome it? And finally, at the most basic level of mind, the alaya consciousness (藏識), is there originally purity or taint? The AMF dealt with these questions in a systematic and thorough fashion, working through the Yogacāra concept of the alaya consciousness. The technical term used in the AMF which functions as a metaphorical synonym for interpenetration is "permeation" or "perfumation (薫)," referring to the fact that defilement (煩惱) "perfumates" suchness (眞如), and suchness perfumates defilement, depending on the current condition of the mind.

== See also ==
- Anatta in the Tathagatagarbha Sutras
- Brahmavihara
- Doctrine of Consciousness-Only
- Mindstream
- Thirty Verses on Consciousness-only
- Three kinds of objects

== Sources ==
- Kalupahana, David J. (1992), The Principles of Buddhist Psychology, Delhi: ri Satguru Publications
- Kochumuttom, Thomas A. (1999), A buddhist Doctrine of Experience. A New Translation and Interpretation of the Works of Vasubandhu the Yogacarin, Delhi: Motilal Banarsidass
- Norbu, Namkhai (2001). The Precious Vase: Instructions on the Base of Santi Maha Sangha. Shang Shung Edizioni. Second revised edition. (Translated from the Tibetan, edited and annotated by Adriano Clemente with the help of the author. Translated from Italian into English by Andy Lukianowicz.)
- Epstein, Ronald (undated). Verses Delineating the Eight Consciousnesses . A translation and explanation of the "Verses Delineating the Eight Consciousnesses by Tripitaka Master Hsuan-Tsang of the Tang Dynasty.
