= Heart Sutra =

Popular sutra in Mahāyāna Buddhism

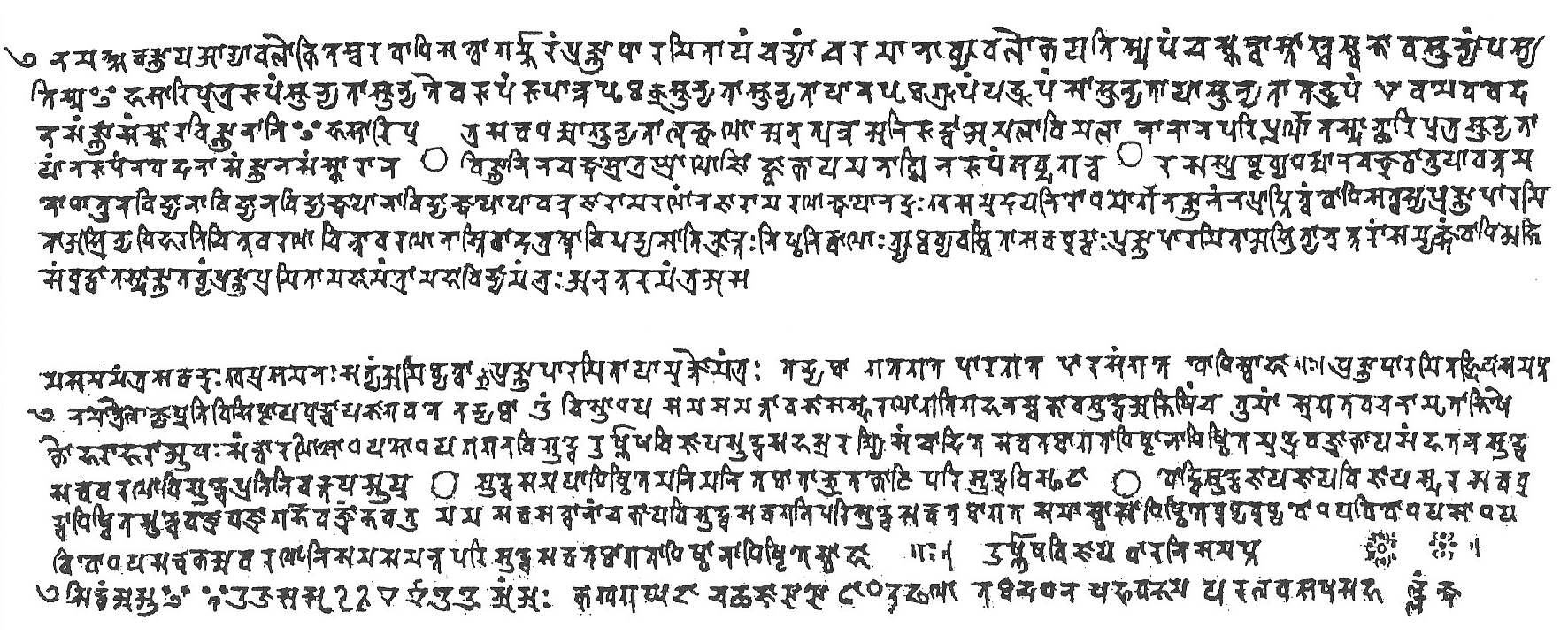
- A reproduction of the palm-leaf manuscript in Siddham script, originally held at Hōryū-ji Temple, Japan; now located in the Tokyo National Museum at the Gallery of Hōryū-ji Treasure. The original copy may be the earliest extant Sanskrit manuscript dated to the 7th–8th century CE.

Information
- Religion: Mahāyāna Buddhism
- Author: Unknown
- Language: Sanskrit
- Period: 7th century CE; an early version may have existed in the 3rd century

Full text
- Heart Sutra at Sanskrit Wikisource
- Heart Sutra at English Wikisource

The Heart Sūtra (Note: Sanskrit: प्रज्ञापारमिताहृदय Prajñāpāramitāhṛdaya, simplified Chinese: 心经; traditional Chinese: 心經; pinyin: Xīnjīng, Tibetan: བཅོམ་ལྡན་འདས་མ་ཤེས་རབ་ཀྱི་ཕ་རོལ་ཏུ་ཕྱིན་པའི་སྙིང་པོ) is a popular sūtra in Mahāyāna Buddhism. In Sanskrit, the title Prajñāpāramitāhṛdaya translates as "The Heart of the Perfection of Wisdom". It is traditionally associated with the Bodhisattva Avalokiteśvara (commonly known in East Asian Buddhism as Guanyin), who is the interlocutor of the sūtra.

The sūtra famously states, "Form is emptiness (śūnyatā), emptiness is form." It has been called "the most frequently used and recited text in the entire Mahayana Buddhist tradition." The text has been translated into English dozens of times from Chinese, Sanskrit, and Tibetan, as well as other source languages.

== Summary of the sūtra ==
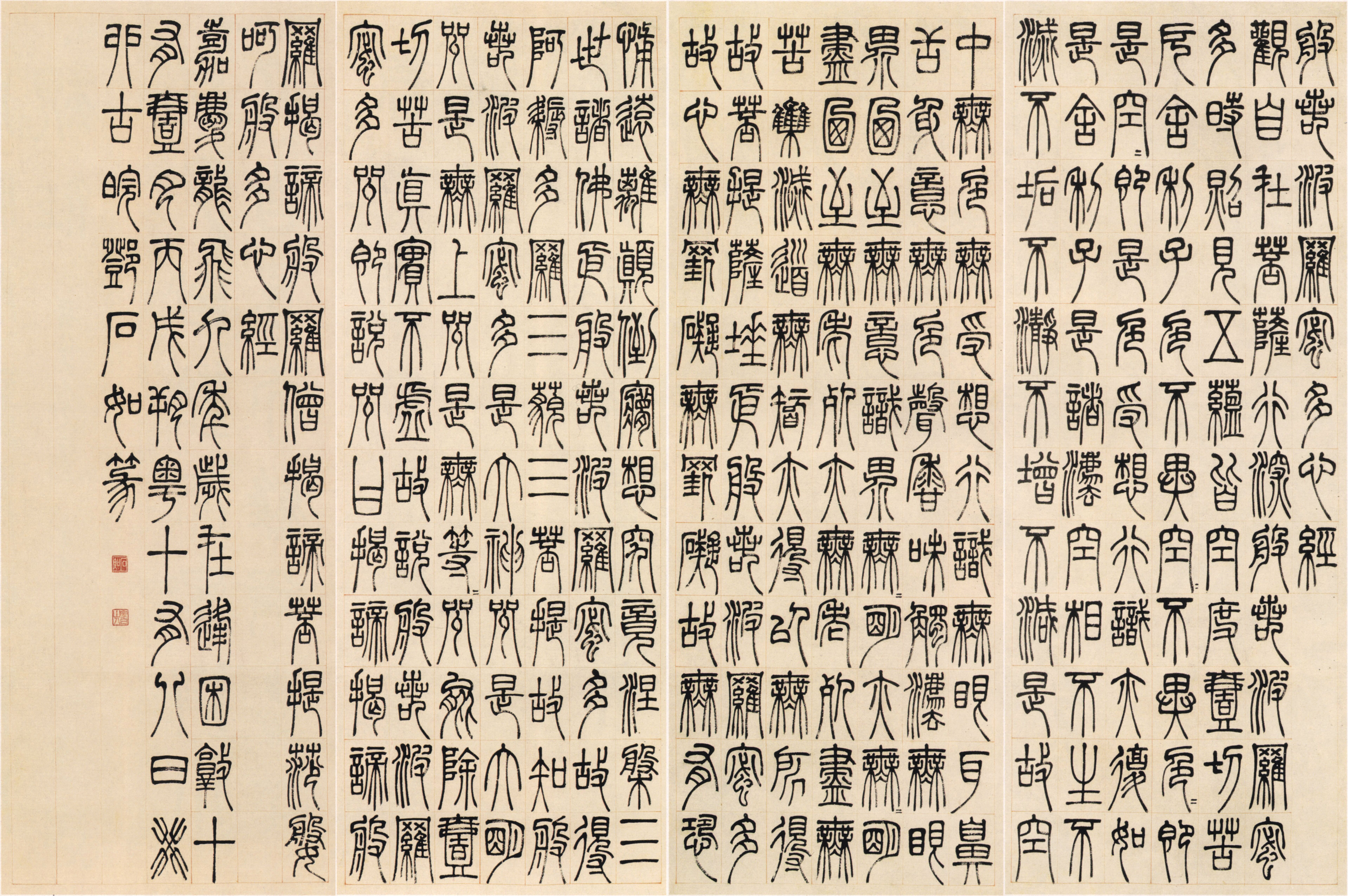
Qing dynasty calligraphy of the Heart Sūtra in Chinese seal script by Deng Shiru

In the sūtra, Avalokiteśvara addresses Śaripūtra, explaining the fundamental emptiness (śūnyatā) of all phenomena, known through and as the five aggregates of human existence (skandhas): form (rūpa), feeling (vedanā), volitions (saṅkhāra), perceptions (saṃjñā), and mind (vijñāna). Avalokiteśvara famously states, "Form is Emptiness (śūnyatā). Emptiness is Form", and declares the other skandhas to be equally empty—that is, dependently originated.

Avalokiteśvara then goes through some of the most fundamental Buddhist teachings, such as the Four Noble Truths, and explains that in emptiness, none of these notions apply. This is interpreted according to the two truths doctrine as saying that teachings, while accurate descriptions of conventional truth, are mere statements about reality—they are not reality itself—and that they are therefore not applicable to the ultimate truth that is by definition beyond mental understanding. Thus the bodhisattva, as the archetypal Mahayana Buddhist, relies on the perfection of wisdom, defined in the Mahāprajñāpāramitā Sūtra to be the wisdom that perceives reality directly without conceptual attachment, thereby achieving nirvana.

== Popularity and stature ==
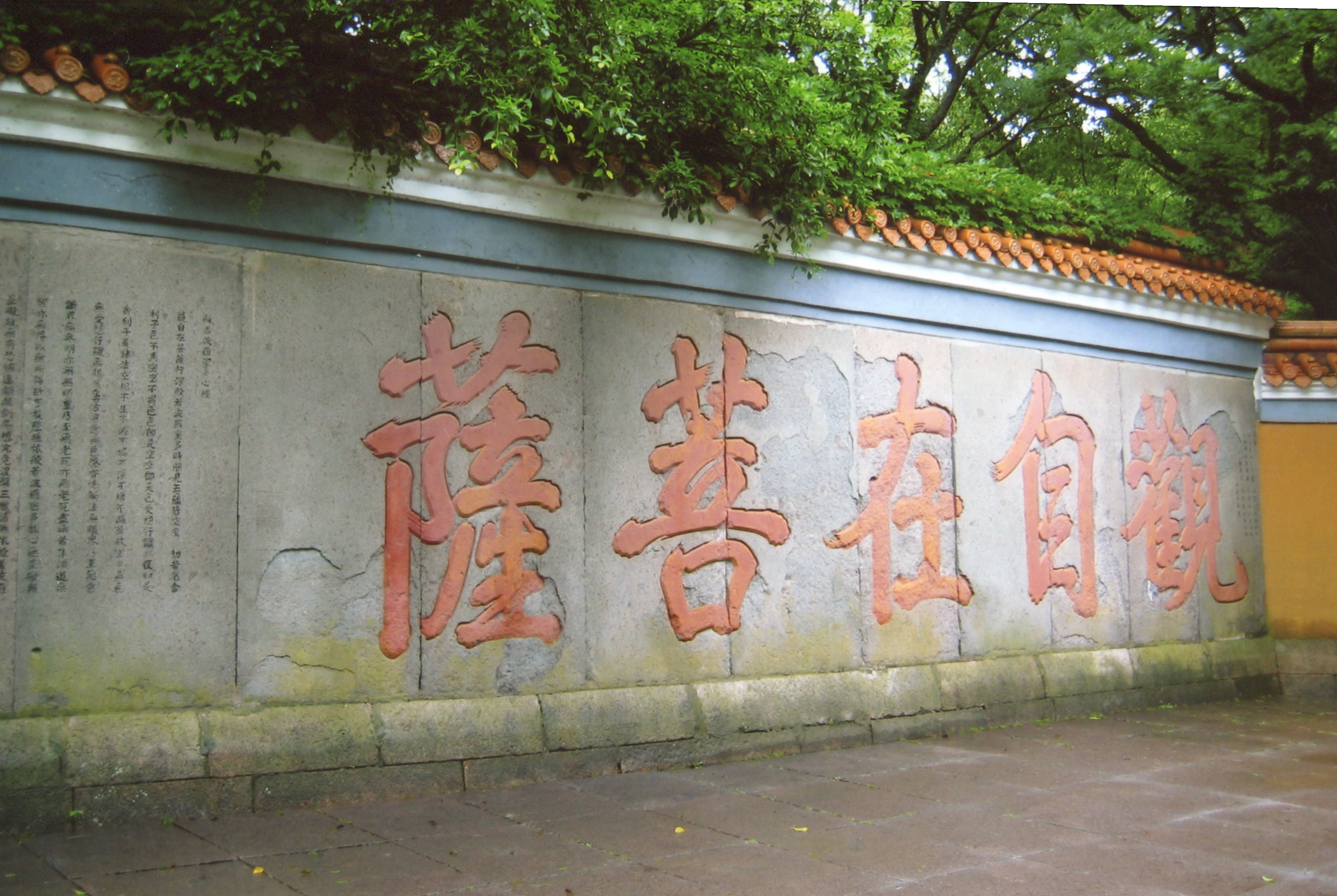
The Heart Sūtra engraved (dated to 1723) on a wall in Mount Putuo, bodhimanda of Avalokiteśvara Bodhisattva. The five large red characters read "guān zì zài pú sà" in Mandarin, one of the Chinese names for Avalokiteśvara or Guanyin, which is at the beginning of the sūtra. The rest of the sūtra is in black characters.

The Heart Sūtra is "the single most commonly recited, copied, and studied scripture in East Asian Buddhism." (Note: Pine (2004, pp. 36–7): "Chen-k'o [Zibo Zhenke or Daguan Zhenke (one of the four great Buddhist Masters of the late Ming Dynasty - member of the Chan sect] says 'This sutra is the principal thread that runs through the entire Buddhist Tripitaka. Although a person's body includes many organs and bones, the heart is the most important.') (Note: Storch (2014, p. 172): "Near the Foguangshan temple in Taiwan, one million handwritten copies of the Heart-sutra were buried in December of 2011. They were interred inside a golden sphere by the seat of a thirty-seven-meter-tall bronze statue of the Buddha; in a separate adjacent stupa, a tooth of the Buddha had been buried a few years earlier. The burial of one million copies of the sutra is believed to having created gigantic karmic merit for the people who transcribed it, as well as for the rest of humanity.") It is recited by adherents of Mahayana schools of Buddhism regardless of sectarian affiliation with the exception of Shin Buddhists and Nichiren Buddhists, apart from being recited by Yiguandao believers, who also worship Avalokiteśvara Bodhisattva, known as the "Ancient Buddha of the Southern Seas".

While the origin of the sūtra is disputed by some modern scholars, (Note: Buswell & Lopez (2014, p. 657): "there is as yet no scholarly consensus on the provenance of the text") it was widely known throughout South Asia (including Afghanistan) from at least the Pala Empire period (c. 750–1200 CE) and in parts of India until at least the middle of the 14th century. (Note: Lopez (1996, p. 239): "We can assume, at least, that the sutra was widely known during the Pala period (c. 750–1155 in Bengal and c. 750–1199 in Bihar)." * Lopez (1996, pp. 18–20 footnote 8): "...it suggests that the Heart Sutra was recited at Vikramalaśīla (or Vikramashila)(located in today's Bihar, India) and Atisa (982 CE – 1054 CE) appears to be correcting his pronunciation [Tibetan monks visiting Vikramalaśīla – therefore also an indication of the popularity of the Heart Sutra in Tibet during the 10th century] from ha rūpa ha vedanā to a rūpa a vedanā to, finally, the more familiar na rūpa na vedanā, saying that because it is the speech of Avalokita, there is nothing wrong to saying na.") (Note: Basically Lin & Lin (2020, pp. 311–319) states a Kashmiri Buddhist monk Paṇḍit Sahajaśrī arrived in Gansu China around 1355, with a Kashmiri manuscript of the Heart Sutra [etc.] with the intention of going on a pilgrimage to Mount Wutai; this intention is realized in 1369. A Chinese monk named Zhiguang [among others] becomes a disciple of Paṇḍit Sahajaśrī. The Hongwu Emperor grants the title of National Preceptor first to Paṇḍit Sahajaśrī and later Zhiguang. Zhiguang translates the Kashmiri long version of the Heart Sutra into Chinese; several differences exist in this translation compared with previous Chinese translations of the same including one prior Chinese translation from a different Kashmiri text. [In the summer of 1998, this previously forgotten Ming Dynasty translation was inadvertently rediscovered by Lin while he was part a Buddhist delegation from Taiwan visiting Beijing's Peking University Library.] On pp 308–309: The Heart Sutra was translated multiple times in China. The translators brought texts from various regions of medieval India : Oddiyana [now the Swat valley in Pakistan], Kapisi [now part of Afghanistan], South India, East India and Middle India.) The stature of the Heart Sūtra throughout early medieval India can be seen from its title 'Holy Mother of all Buddhas Heart of the Perfection of Wisdom' dating from at least the 8th century CE (see philological explanation of the text). (Note: Lopez (1996, p. 141,142): Jñānamitra [the medieval Indian monk–commentator c. 10th–11th Century] wrote in his Sanskrit commentary entitled 'Explanation of the Noble Heart of the Perfection of Wisdom' (Āryaprajñāpāramitāhṛdayavyākhyā), "There is nothing in any sutra that is not contained in the Heart of the Perfection of Wisdom. Therefore it is called the sutra of sutras." Jñānamitra also said regarding the Sanskrit title of the Heart Sutra 'bhagavatīprajñāpāramitāhṛdayaṃ' and the meaning of the word bhagavatī,"With regard to [the feminine ending] 'ī', all the buddhas arise from practicing the meaning of the perfection of wisdom. Therefore, since the perfection of wisdom comes to be the mother of all buddhas, [the feminine ending] 'ī' is [used].)

The long version of the Heart Sūtra is extensively studied by the various Tibetan Buddhist schools, where the Heart Sūtra is chanted, but also treated as a tantric text, with a tantric ceremony associated with it. It is also viewed as one of the daughter sūtras of the Prajnaparamita genre in the Vajrayana tradition as passed down from Tibet. (Note: Sonam Gyaltsen Gonta, Shithar & Saito (2009) : 在佛教教主釋迦牟尼佛（釋尊）對弟子們講述的眾多教義中，《般若經》在思想層面上是最高的。....而將《大般若經》的龐大內容、深遠幽玄本質，不但毫無損傷反而將其濃縮在極精簡扼要的經文中，除了《般若心經》之外沒有能出其右的了...(transl: Among all the teachings taught by Sakyamuni Buddha to his disciples, the highest is the prajñāpāramitā....there are no works besides the Heart Sutra that even comes close to condensing the vast contents of the Mahaprajnaparamita Sutra's [the name of a Chinese compilation of complete prajñāpāramitā sutras having 16 sections within it] far-reaching profundity into an extremely concise form without any lost in meaning...) (Note: The Prajñāpāramitā genre is accepted as Buddhavacana by all past and present Buddhist schools with Mahayana affiliation.)

The text has been translated into many languages, and dozens of English translations and commentaries have been published, along with an unknown number of informal versions on the internet. (Note: Of special interest is the 2011 Thai translation of the six different editions of the Chinese version of the Heart Sutra under the auspices of Phra Visapathanee Maneepaket 'The Chinese-Thai Mahāyāna Sūtra Translation Project in Honour of His Majesty the King'; an example of the position of the Heart Sutra and Mahayana Buddhism in Theravadan countries.)

== Versions ==
There are two main versions of the Heart Sūtra: a short version and a long version.

The short version as translated by Xuanzang is the most popular version of adherents practicing East Asian schools of Buddhism. Xuanzang's canonical text (T. 251) has a total of 260 Chinese characters. Some Japanese and Korean versions have an additional 2 characters. (Note: Lin 2020: *On p 324: Xuanzang's abridged version of the Heart Sutra is the one generally used, the version used in China and Korea has 260 characters. But the general version used in Japan has 262 characters [in English translation, the difference is the word 'all' which is in bold font] (namely the line '...leaving behind all confused imagination...') *On p 334 Prof. Biswadeb Mukherjee said: Korea uses both [260 and 262 character] versions.) The short version has also been translated into Tibetan but it is not part of the current Tibetan Buddhist Canon.

The long version differs from the short version by including both an introductory and concluding section, features that most Buddhist sūtras have. The introduction introduces the sūtra to the listener with the traditional Buddhist opening phrase "Thus have I heard". It then describes the venue in which the Buddha (or sometimes bodhisattvas, etc.) promulgate the teaching and the audience to whom the teaching is given. The concluding section ends the sūtra with thanks and praises to the Buddha.

Both versions are chanted on a daily basis by adherents of practically all schools of East Asian Buddhism and by some adherents of Tibetan and Newar Buddhism.

== Dating and origins ==
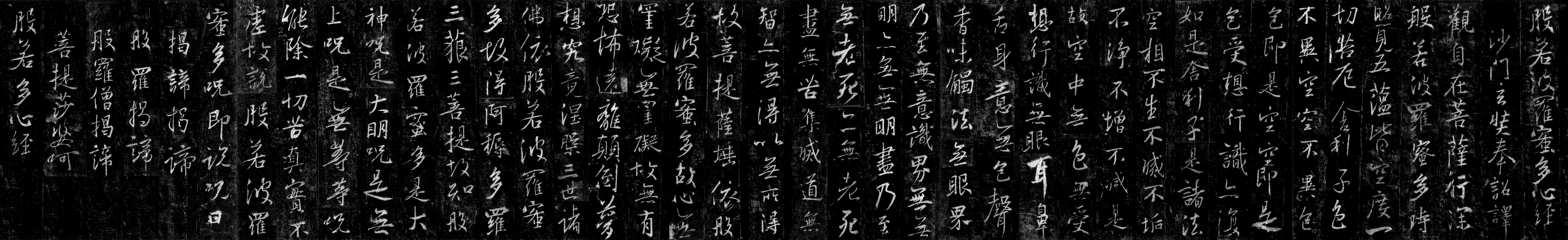
The third oldest dated copy of the Heart Sutra, on part of the stele of Emperor Tang Taizong's Foreword to the Holy Teaching, written on behalf of Xuanzang in 648 CE, erected by his son, Emperor Tang Gaozong in 672 CE, known for its exquisite calligraphy in the style of Wang Xizhi (303–361 CE) – Xian's Beilin Museum

=== Earliest Chinese translation ===
The earliest version of the Heart Sūtra may have been translated by Zhi Qian in 222–250 CE. However, because it was already lost by Xuanzang's time, its contents are unknown. According to Conze, Kumarajiva's (fl 4th century CE) translation of the short version of the Heart Sūtra (T250) is the earliest translation of the Heart Sūtra; however he believes it should be attributed to one of Kumarajiva's disciples. John McRae and Jan Nattier have argued that this translation was created by someone else, much later, based on Kumārajīva's Mahāprajñāpāramitāupadeśa (Great Treatise on the Perfection of Wisdom). The earliest extant copy of Kumarajiva's translation however, dates only to the Jin dynasty (1115–1234). According to Huili's biography, Xuanzang learned the sūtra from an inhabitant of Sichuan, and subsequently chanted it during times of danger on his journey to the West (i.e. India). Xuanzang however did not translate the Heart Sūtra until some years after his return to China in 649 CE. Xuanzang's version of the Heart Sūtra (T251) in the Chinese Tripiṭaka is the first extant version to use the title "Heart Sūtra" (心經; xīnjīng). Fukui Fumimasa has argued that Heart Sūtra may mean dhāraṇī sūtra.

This sūtra is classified by Edward Conze as belonging to the third of four periods in the development of the Prajñāpāramitā canon, although because it contains a mantra (sometimes called a dhāraṇī), it does overlap with the final, tantric phase of development according to this scheme, and is included in the tantra section of at least some editions of the Kangyur. Conze estimates the sūtra's date of origin to be 350 CE; some others consider it to be two centuries older than that.

=== Earliest extant versions and references to the Heart Sūtra ===
The earliest extant dated text of the Heart Sūtra is a stone stele dated to 661 CE. It was engraved three years before the death of Tripitaka Master Xuanzang and twelve years after its translation, by patrons from Yueyang County adjacent to Chang'an (today known as Xian) not far from where Xuanzang was doing his translation work at the time. It is part of the Fangshan Stone Sūtra and located in Yunju Temple nearby Beijing. The second oldest extant dated text of the Heart Sūtra is another stone stele located at Yunju Temple. It is dated to 669 CE. The third earliest extant dated text of the Heart Sūtra is a stone stele dated to 672 CE; formerly believed to be the oldest extant text which now stands in the Beilin Museum, Xian. All of the above stone steles have the same descriptive inscription: "(Tripitaka Master) Xuanzang was commanded by Emperor Tang Taizong to translate the Heart Sūtra." (Note: Gao you (2016-09-27). "Fáng shān shí jīng 《 xīn jīng 》 kān kè yán jiū chéng guǒ fā bù bèi rèn wéi shì xiàn cún zuì zǎo bǎn běn ， wéi xuán zàng suǒ yì" 房山石经 《心经》 刊刻研究成果发布 被认为是现存最早版本，为玄奘所译 [Fangshan’s Stone Sutra's "Heart Sutra" : Announcement of Results of Research into Engraved Stone Stele - Presumed to be Earliest Extant Copy - Translated by Xuanzang]. 国家文物局 State Administration of Cultural Heritage (in Chinese). "而房山石经中唐高宗显庆六年 （661年） 镌刻的 《心经》 是现存最早的版本， 镌刻时玄奘尚在世， 三年以后才圆寂。 这部石经明确题署： “三藏法师玄奘奉诏译”，而且造经功德主来自邻近长安的栎阳县， 距离玄奘当时所在的大慈恩寺不远。同时， 唐高宗总章二年（669 年）镌刻的《心经》， 同样题署“三藏法师玄奘奉诏译”。 此外， 西安碑林收藏的咸亨三年（672 年）弘福寺沙门怀仁集王羲之书《大唐三藏圣教序》 后面的 《心经》， 也题署“玄奘奉诏译”。 由此可以确证： 玄奘翻译了 《心经》， 而且是“奉”唐太宗的“诏”命翻译的。 (tr. to English: …amongst Fangshan Stone Sutra Steles, the engraved stone stele of the Heart Sutra dated to 661 CE is the earliest extant copy of [Xuanzang’s 649 translation of] the Heart Sutra, made while Xuanzang was still alive, as he passed away three years after the engraving. This stone sutra stele explicitly states in its colophon : “Tripitaka Master Xuanzang was ordered to translate”;moreover the merits for engraving the stele came mainly from Yueyang County adjacent from Chang’an (today’s Xian), which is not far from Daci’en Monastery [where Xuanzang was translating sutras at the time]. Also there is another engraved stone stele of the Heart Sutra [located at Fangshan] dated to 669 CE which also has the same colophon inscription i.e. “Tripitaka Master Xuanzang was ordered to translate”. In addition to these, we have the Xian's Stele Forest [stone stele] dated to 672 CE, Hongfu Temple’s [another temple where Tripitaka Master Xuanzang translated sutras] Ven. Master Huairen’s [commission of the (re)engraving of] “Foreword of the Holy Teaching of the Tripitaka of the Great Tang” [written by Emperor Tang Taizong] [reign 626 CE - 649 CE] and on the reverse the “Heart Sutra” [both] in the collected calligraphic style of Wang Xizhi, also is inscribed with “Xuanzang was ordered to translate”. Therefore these examples certified that Xuanzang did indeed translate the Heart Sutra and furthermore was ordered to do so by Emperor Taizong of the Tang Dynasty."))

A palm-leaf manuscript found at the Hōryū-ji Temple is the earliest undated extant Sanskrit manuscript of the Heart Sūtra. It is dated to c. 7th–8th century CE by the Tokyo National Museum where it is currently kept.

=== Authorship of the Heart Sūtra ===
==== Nattier's hypothesis ====
According to Conze (1967), approximately 90% of the Heart Sūtra is derivable from the larger Sanskrit Prajñāpāramitā Sūtras, including the Pañcaviṃśatisāhasrikā Prajñāpāramitā Sūtra (Prajñāpāramitā Sūtra in 25,000 lines), the Aṣṭasāhasrikā Prajñāpāramitā Sūtra (Prajñāpāramitā Sūtra in 8,000 lines), and the Śatasāhasrikā Prajñāpāramitā Sūtra (Prajñāpāramitā Sūtra in 100,000 lines).

Nattier (1992) questions the Sanskrit origins of the Heart Sūtra. Nattier states that there is no direct or indirect evidence (such as a commentary) of a Sanskrit version before the 8th century, and she dates the first evidence (in the form of commentaries by Xuanzang's disciples Kuiji and Woncheuk, and Dunhuang manuscripts) of Chinese versions to the 7th century. Nattier believes that the corroborating evidence supports a Chinese version at least a century before a Sanskrit version.

Nattier further argues that it is unusual for Avalokiteśvara to be in the central role in a Prajñāpāramitā text. Early Prajñāpāramitā texts involve Subhuti, who is absent from both versions of the Heart Sūtra. The Buddha is only present in the longer version of the Heart Sūtra. Nattier claims the presence of Avalokitesvara in the Heart Sūtra could be considered evidence that the text is Chinese in origin as Avalokitesvara was never as popular in India. Nattier also points out that the "gate gate" mantra exists in several variations, and is associated with several different Prajñāpāramitā texts.

According to Nattier, only 40% of the extant text of the Heart Sūtra is a quotation from the Mahāprajñāpāramitāupadeśa (Great Treatise on the Perfection of Wisdom), a commentary on the Pañcaviṃśatisāhasrikā Prajñāpāramitā Sūtra written by Nāgārjuna and translated by Kumārajīva; while the rest was newly composed. Based on textual patterns in the extant Sanskrit and Chinese versions of the Heart Sūtra, the Mahāprajñāpāramitāupadeśa and the Pañcaviṃśatisāhasrikā Prajñāpāramitā Sūtra, Nattier has argued that the supposedly earliest extant version of the Heart Sūtra, translated by Kumārajīva (344–413), (Note: Taisho 250 translated by Kumārajīva, or another text so far unknown.) that Xuanzang supposedly received from an inhabitant of Sichuan prior to his travels to India, was probably first composed in China in the Chinese language from a mixture of material derived from Kumārajīva's Chinese translation of the Mahāprajñāpāramitāupadeśa, and newly composed text (60% of the text). According to Nattier, Xuanzang's version of this text (Taisho 251) was later translated into Sanskrit, or properly speaking, back-translated, since part of the sūtra was a translation of a Sanskrit text.

According to Nattier, excluding the new composition, Kumarajiva's version of the Heart Sūtra (T250) matches the corresponding parts of Kumārajīva's translation of the Mahāprajñāpāramitāupadeśa almost exactly; the other, Xuanzang's version (T251) are missing two lines (Note: One from the beginning and one from the middle) with a number of other differences, including one different line, and differences in terminology. The corresponding extant Sanskrit texts (i.e., Heart Sūtra and Prajñāpāramitā Sūtra in 25,000 lines), while agreeing in meaning, differ in virtually every word.

==== Criticism of Nattier ====
Nattier's hypothesis has been rejected by several scholars, including Harada Waso, Fukui Fumimasa, Ishii Kōsei, and Siu Sai Yau, on the basis of historical accounts and comparison with the extant Sanskrit Buddhist manuscript fragments. (Note: Harada's cross-philological study is based on Chinese, Sanskrit and Tibetan texts.) Harada and Ishii, as well as other researchers such as Hyun Choo and Dan Lusthaus, also argue that evidence can be found within the 7th-century commentaries of Kuiji and Woncheuk, two important disciples of Xuanzang, that undermine Nattier's argument. (Note: Choo : * On p 146–147 [quote from Woncheuk's Prajñāpāramitā Heart Sutra Commentary] "A version [of the Heart Sūtra (in Chinese)] states that "[The Bodhisattva] illuminatingly sees that the five aggregates, etc., are all empty." Although there are two different versions [(in Chinese)], the latter [that is, the new version] is the correct one because the word "etc." is found in the original Sanskrit scripture [of the Heart Sutra] (the Sanskrit scripture refers to the Heart Sutra as this passage is part of the frame section, a part unique to the Heart Sutra and not to be found in any other Prajnaparamita genre text). [The meaning of] "etc." described in the latter [version] should be understood based on [the doctrine of Dharmapāla].") (Note: Ishii : * On p 6 "...the Chinese line of 照見五蘊皆空 [this line is equivalent to Choo's translation [The Bodhisattva] illuminatingly sees that the five aggregates are all empty], which never appears in Chinese Prajñāpāramitā literature until the Chinese Hṛdaya...") (Note: Harada (2002, p. 111, footnote 19): "Wonchuk in his "Praises of the Heart Sutra" after commenting on the line "illuminatingly sees that the five skandas are all empty", states "and there is a text which says : 'illuminatingly sees the five skandas, etc. are all empty'. However, there are two texts with the latter one being correct. I checked the Sanskrit manuscript [of the Heart Sutra] and it has 'etc'. Therefore, it should be in accordance with what the latter text says (i.e. etc.) ". Additionally, Kuiji (632-682 CE) in his "Making the Obscure Clear in the Heart Sutra" also comments on the quotation "illuminatingly sees the five skandhas, etc. are all empty". Jingmai's (fl. 629-649 CE) "Commentary on the Heart Sutra" and Chikō's (709-780 CE) "A Description of the Meaning of the Prajñāhrdaya Sutra" follows the same pattern. Kūkai's (774-835 CE) "Secret Key to the Heart Sutra" provides special testimony to the association of etc. with Xuanzang's translation of the Heart Sutra while on the other hand, Kūkai also associates the text without etc. with Kumarajiva and which is also the object of his commentary. However, one cannot find the word 'etc.' in any of the quotations in the first commentator Huijing's (578-? CE) "Commentary on the Heart Sutra"; he died before Xuanzang. In addition, this is also the case for any of the quotations found in Fazang's (643–712 CE) "A Brief Commentary on the Heart Sutra"...") (Note: While Lusthaus (2003, p. 83) along with Choo, Harada and Ishii agree that Wonchuk consulted with a Sanskrit text of the Heart Sutra, he is unique in his hypothesis that the Sanskrit text may have been the Sanskrit text of the lost Chinese translation by Zhiqian.)

Li states that of the Indic Palm-leaf manuscript (patra sūtras) or sastras brought over to China, most were either lost or not translated. (Note: Li Xuezhu (李学竹). "Zhōng guó zàng xué - Zhōng guó fàn wén bèi yè gài kuàng" 中国藏学-中国梵文贝叶概况 [China Tibet Studies-The State of Sanskrit Language Palm Leaf Manuscripts in China]. Baidu文库 (Website tr. to English: Baidu Library) (in Chinese). p. 54.: 在现存的汉文大藏经中，将近1500部6000卷佛教典籍译的梵文贝叶经，如果包括译后失专或未翻译的经典内，传到汉地的梵文贝叶经至少在5000部以上。(tr. to English: In the currently extant Chinese Tripitakas, there are close to 1500 sections of 6000 scrolls worth of Sanskrit patra sutras translated into Chinese. If we include the translations that are no longer extant and the sutras and sastras that were never translated, the Indic patra sutras and śāstras that arrived in China would be at the very least over 5000 sections of patra sutras / śāstras.)) Red Pine, a practicing American Buddhist, favours the idea of a lost manuscript of the Large Perfection of Wisdom Sūtra (Pañcaviṃśatisāhasrikā Prajñāpāramitā Sūtra) with the alternate Sanskrit wording, allowing for an original Indian composition, which may still be extant, and located at the Giant Wild Goose Pagoda. (Note: Li Xuezhu (李学竹). "Zhōng guó zàng xué - Zhōng guó fàn wén bèi yè gài kuàng" 中国藏学-中国梵文贝叶概况 [China Tibet Studies-The State of Sanskrit Language Palm Leaf Manuscripts in China]. Baidu文库 (Website tr. to English: Baidu Library) (in Chinese). p. 55.: 所以有人猜想玄奘大师所取回的贝叶经可能就藏在大雁塔的地宫。(tr. to English: Therefore there are people (scholars) who conjecture that the (657) patra sutras Xuanzang brought back may be stored in an underground chamber of the Giant Wild Goose Pagoda.)) (Note: Gěng cōng (耿聪) (2008-05-12). "Zhuān jiā: Xuánzàng dài huí de zhēn bǎo kě néng zàng yú Xī ān Dà yàn tǎ xià" 专家：玄奘带回的珍宝可能藏于西安大雁塔下 [Experts: Treasures Brought Back by Xuanzang Possibly Stored Underneath the Giant Wild Goose Pagoda]. 人民网图片 (Website tr. to English: people.cn) (in Chinese).: 陕西）省社科院宗教研究所所长王亚荣日前介绍，和法门寺宝塔下有地宫一样，大雁塔下也藏有千年地宫。据推测，玄奘自印度取经归来后，所带回的珍宝有很多藏在大雁塔下的地宫里。...对于大雁塔有地宫一说，...解守涛介绍，去年，相关部门对大雁塔的内部结构进行探测时，探地雷达曾经探测出大雁塔地下有空洞...(tr. to English: (Shaanxi Province) Academy of Social Science Head of Religious Research Wang Yarong yesterday briefed underneath the Giant Wild Goose Pagoda is an underground chamber over 1000 years old just like the one underneath Famen Temple's True Relic Pagoda. Based on her hypothesis, Xuanzang after returning from India, stored many of the treasures he brought back in the underground chamber of the Giant Wild Goose Pagoda....Regarding the hypothesis on the underground chamber in the Giant Wild Goose Pagoda, Jie Shoutao mentioned last year, the relevant departments while investigating the Giant Wild Goose Pagoda using radar detected a hollow area underneath the pagoda...))

Harada rejects Nattier's claims that the central role of Avalokiteśvara points to a Chinese origin for the Heart Sūtra. Harada notes that the Aṣṭasāhasrikā Prajñāpāramitā ("Prajñāpāramitā Sūtra in 8,000 lines"), one of the two oldest prajñāpāramitā sūtras, also has other speakers than the Buddha, namely Subhuti, Saripūtra as well as Ananda. (Note: Harada Waso: "『八千頌般若』では部派仏教の伝統に抵触しない世尊、大比丘眾（特にスブーテイ、シャーリプトラ、アーナンダ等）、弥勒、天部といった登場人物たちによって過激を＜般若波羅蜜多＞思想が討義されている。"(English tr to follow)) Harada also notes the blending of Prajñāpāramitā and Avalokiteśvara Bodhisattvas in Mahayana Buddhist belief beginning from at least Faxian and Xuanzang's time (i.e. 4th–5th century CE and 7th century CE); and therefore Avalokiteśvara's presence in the Heart Sūtra is quite natural. Siu also notes that Avalokitesvara's presence as the main speaker in the Heart Sūtra is justifiable on several bases. (Note: Siu 2017, pp 72 "般若佛典中，內容常為佛陀與舍利子之對答，從中宣示教要，鮮見觀自在菩薩授法之片段，惟略本《心經》以觀自在為核心角色，豈非與一般般若之內涵不同？首先，般若經典中之教說，非純為佛陀所宣，亦非純記其與弟子之對答內容，實不乏菩薩眾發問及弘教（319），同得佛陀認記（320）。" (trans: The contents of the Prajnaparamita genre often has the Buddha answering questions from Sariputra thereby promulgating the essentials of the teachings, its only in the Heart Sutra where Avalokitesvara is the central speaker, why is this so? The teachings of the Prajnaparamita genre are not purely the promulgation of the Buddha nor purely record the discourse between Buddha and his disciples; in fact its not out of the ordinary for bodhisattvas to ask questions and propagate the Dharma, with the approval of the Buddha.) and pp 73 "該菩薩不但名揚中土，天竺各地敬奉者眾多（322）" (trans: [Avalokitesvara] was not only popular in China but was popular throughout the different regions of India.) and footnote 322 in summary states Those promoting the back-translation theory (cf Nattier p 176) often raise the issue that the presence of Avalokitesvara in the extant text of the Heart Sutra is because of the popularity of Avalokitesvara in China at the time, and when creating the sutra [in China] made Avalokitesvara to be the main speaker. This is really untrue. Faxian notes the Mahayana worship of Prajnaparamita, Manjusri and Avalokitesvara in the early 5th century CE [in Mathura, Northern India]. Guṇabhadra on his sea voyage from Sri Lanka [this suggests Avalokitesvara worship was present in Southern India as well as Sri Lanka] to China encountered difficulties which were resolved by the crew and him beseeching Avalokitesvara (early 5th century CE). Xuanzang [in his travelogue] notes several places where Avalokitesvara had famous shrines (located throughout all regions of India) (early 7th century CE).) (Note: According to Lopez (1988, p. 19), in the long version of the Heart Sutra, Buddha, Avalokiteśvara and Sariputra are present and it is through the power of Buddha that Sariputra asks Avalokiteśvara for advice on the practice of the Perfection of Wisdom. According to Lopez (1988, p. 188, footnote 14), Avalokiteśvara is also present as the speaker in one other prajñāpāramitā sutra: "Avalokiteśvara also appears in the tantric Prajñāpāramitā text, the Svalpākṣarā prajñāpāramitāsūtra ." See also Xizai (1982), the Svalpākṣarā prajñāpāramitāsūtra; and Conze 1974, The Perfection of Wisdom in a Few Words, pp. 144-147, also known as Svalpākṣarā prajñāpāramitāsūtra. Lopez (1988, p. 12) allows for the possibility that earlier Sanskrit commentaries of the Heart Sutra before the 8th century existed but were later lost: "The absence of Indian commentaries from an earlier period could simply be ascribed to the loss of the sastras to the familiar elements of monsoon water and Muslim fire;it could be speculated that many early Heart Sutra commentaries are simply no longer in existence.")

However, the question of authorship remains controversial, and other researchers such as Jayarava Attwood (2021) continue to find Nattier's argument for a Chinese origin of the text to be the most convincing explanation.

== Philological explanation of the text ==
=== Title ===
==== Historical titles ====
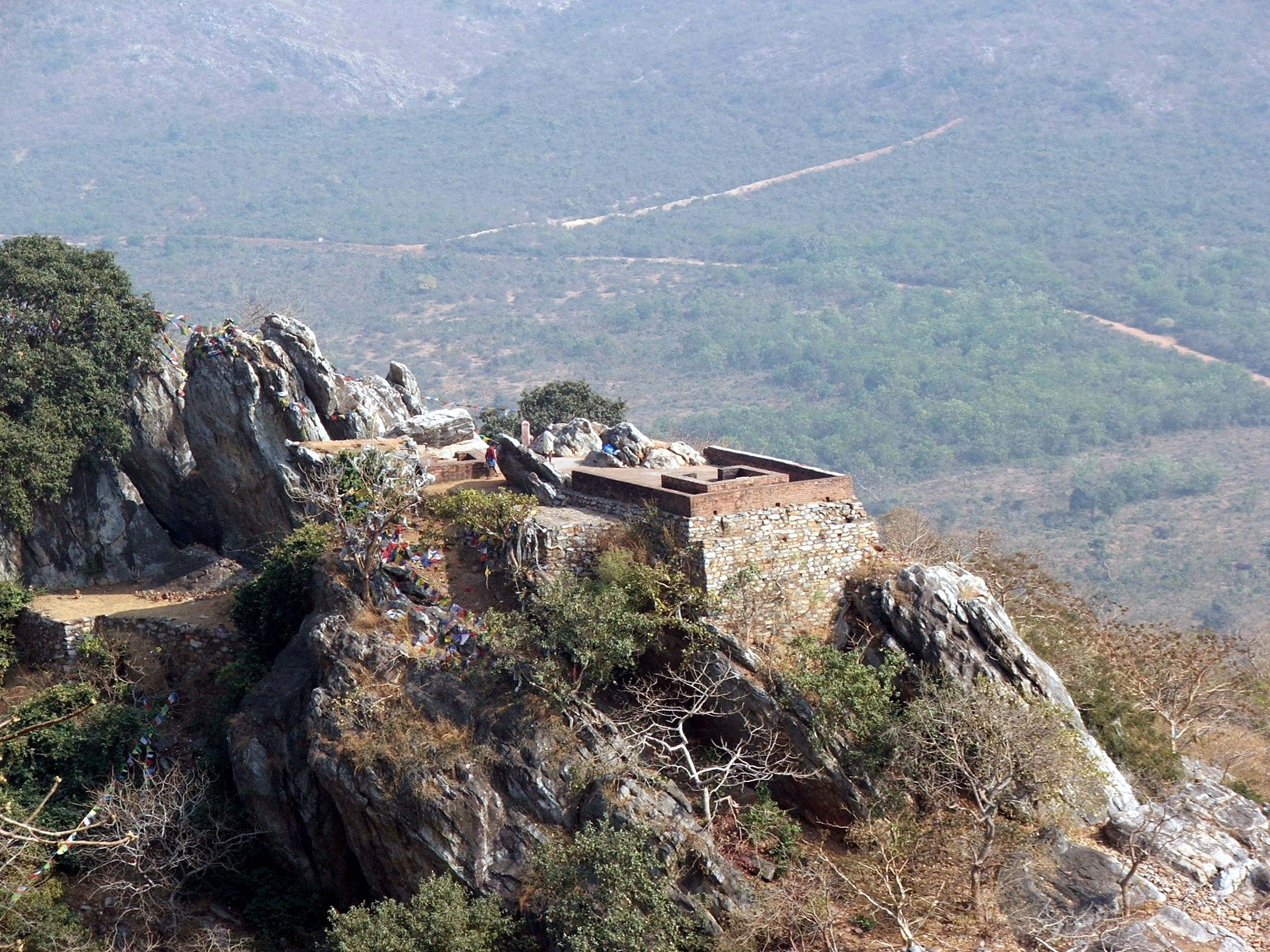
Gridhakuta (also known as Vulture's Peak) located in Rajgir, Bihar, India (in ancient times known as Rājagṛha or Rājagaha (Pali) - Site where Buddha taught the Prajñāpāramitāhṛdaya (Heart Sūtra) and other Prajñāpāramitā sūtras.

The titles of the earliest extant manuscripts of the Heart Sūtra all include the words "hṛdaya" or "heart" and "prajñāpāramitā" or "perfection of wisdom". Beginning from the 8th century and continuing at least until the 13th century, the titles of the Indic manuscripts of the Heart Sūtra contained the words "bhagavatī" or "mother of all buddhas" and "prajñāpāramitā". (Note: Some Sanskrit Titles of the Heart Sutra from 8th–13th centuries CE: 1. āryabhagavatīprajñāpāramitāhṛdayaṃ (Holy Mother of all Buddhas Heart of the Perfection of Wisdom) Sanskrit title of Tibetan translation by unknown translator.; 2. bhagavatīprajñāpāramitāhṛdayaṃ (Mother of all Buddhas Heart of the Perfection of Wisdom) Sanskrit title of Tibetan translation by Vimalamitra who studied in Bodhgayā (today's Bihar State in northern India) in the 8th century CE.; 3. āryabhagavatīprajñāpāramitā (Holy Mother of all Buddhas Perfection of Wisdom) Sanskrit title of Chinese translation by Dānapāla who studied in Oddiyana (today's Swat Valley Pakistan near Afghanistan-Pakistan border) in the 11th century CE.; 4. āryabhagavatīprajñāpāramitā (Holy Mother of all Buddhas Perfection of Wisdom) Sanskrit title of Chinese translation by Dharmalāḍana in the 13th century CE.)

Later Indic manuscripts have more varied titles.

==== Titles in use today ====
In the western world, this sūtra is known as the Heart Sūtra (a translation derived from its most common name in East Asian countries). But it is also sometimes called the Heart of Wisdom Sūtra. In Tibet, Mongolia and other regions influenced by Vajrayana, it is known as The [Holy] Mother of all Buddhas Heart (Essence) of the Perfection of Wisdom.

In the Tibetan text the title is given first in Sanskrit and then in Tibetan: Sanskrit: भगवतीप्रज्ञापारमिताहृदय (Bhagavatīprajñāpāramitāhṛdaya), Tibetan: བཅོམ་ལྡན་འདས་མ་ཤེས་རབ་ཀྱི་ཕ་རོལ་ཏུ་ཕྱིན་པའི་སྙིང་པོ, Wylie: bcom ldan 'das ma shes rab kyi pha rol tu phyin pa'i snying po; transl. Mother of All Buddhas Heart (Essence) of the Perfection of Wisdom. (Note: Sonam Gyaltsen Gonta, Shithar & Saito (2009, p. 1): 直譯經題的「bCom ldan 'das ma」就是「佛母」之意。接下來我們要討論的是「shes rab kyi pha rol tu phyin pa'i」（般若波羅蜜多）。....講述這個般若波羅蜜的經典有《十萬頌般若》、《二萬五千頌般若》、《八千頌般若》...而將《大般若經》的龐大內容、深遠幽玄本質，不但毫無損傷反而將其濃縮在極精簡扼要的經文中，除了《般若心經》之外沒有能出其右的了，因此經題中有「精髓」兩字。(transl: Directly translating the title "bCom ldan 'das ma" - it has the meaning of "Mother of all Buddhas". Now we will discuss the meaning of "shes rab kyi pha rol tu phyin pa'i" (prajñāpāramitā).... Describing the prajñāpāramitā, we have the Śatasāhasrikā Prajñāpāramitā Sūtra [Prajñāpāramitā Sūtra in 100,000 verses], the Pañcaviṃśatisāhasrikā Prajñāpāramitā Sūtra [Prajñāpāramitā Sūtra in 25,000 verses], Aṣṭasāhasrikā Prajñāpāramitā Sūtra [Prajñāpāramitā Sūtra in 8,000 verses]...there are no works besides the Heart Sutra that even comes close to condensing the vast contents of the Mahaprajnaparamita Sutra's [(the name of a Chinese compilation of complete prajñāpāramitā sutras having 16 sections within it and including the 3 aforementioned sutras)] far-reaching profundity into an extremely concise form without any lost in meaning and therefore the title has the two words ["snying po"] meaning "essence" [or "heart"])

In other languages, the commonly used title is an abbreviation of Prajñāpāramitāhṛdayasūtraṃ (i.e., the Prajñāhṛdaya Sūtra or the Heart of Wisdom Sūtra). For example, Korean: Banya Shimgyeong (반야심경); Chinese: Bore Xinjing (般若心经; 般若心經; bōrě xīnjīng); Japanese: Hannya Shingyō (般若心経); Vietnamese: Bát-nhã tâm kinh (般若心經).

=== Content ===
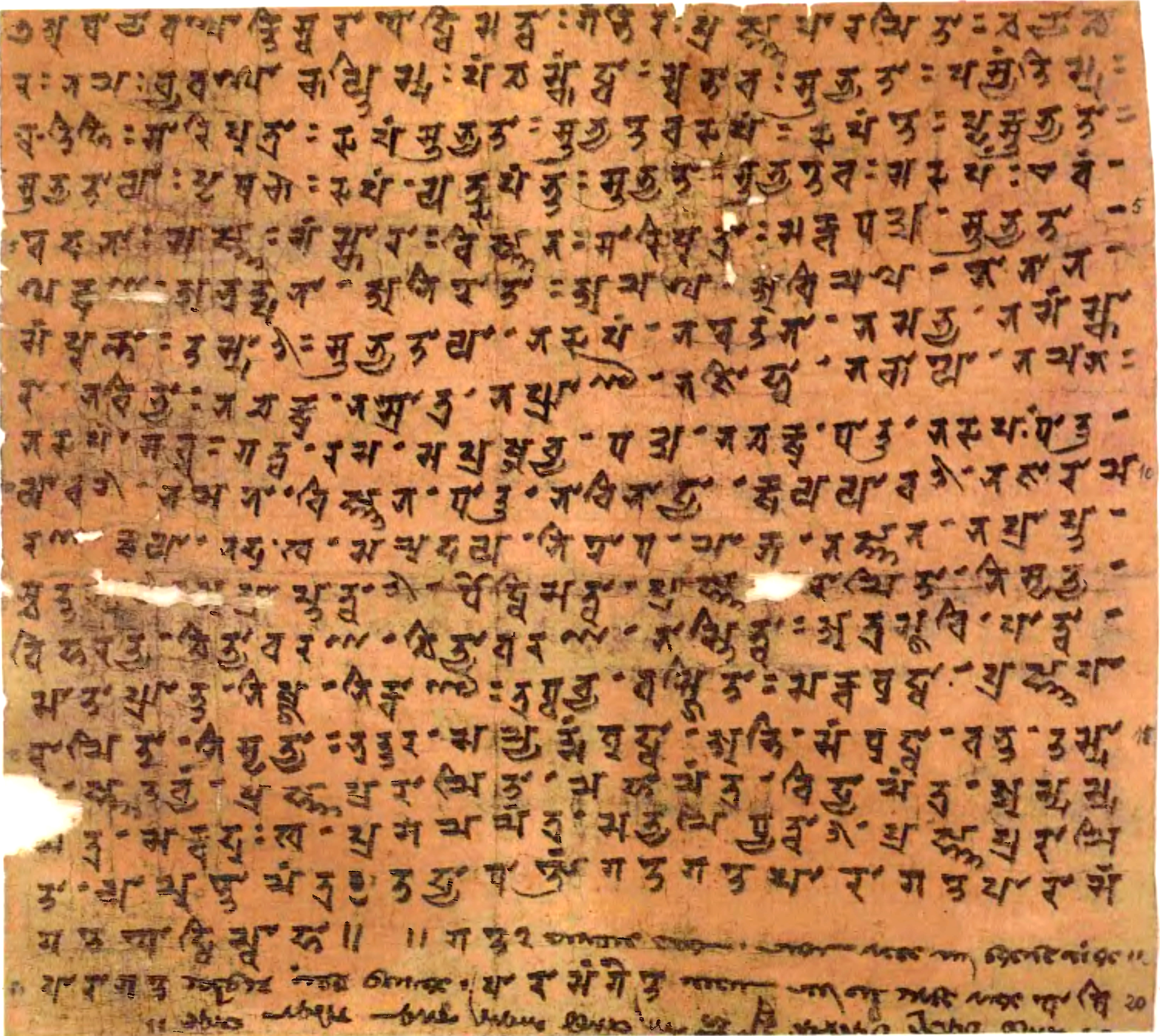
Sanskrit manuscript of the Heart Sūtra, written in the Siddhaṃ script. Bibliothèque nationale de France

Various commentators divide this text into different numbers of sections.

==== Opening ====
In the longer version, there exists the traditional opening "Thus have I heard" and Buddha along with a community of bodhisattvas and monks gathered with the bodhisattva of great compassion, Avalokiteśvara, and Saripūtra, at Gridhakuta (a mountain peak located at Rajgir, the traditional site where the majority of the Perfection of Wisdom teachings were given). Through the power of Buddha, Saripūtra asks Avalokiteśvara (Note: Powers xix: [Avalokiteśvara Bodhisattva's association with the Prajñāpāramitā genre can also be seen in the Saṁdhinirmocana Mahāyāna Sūtra, where Avalokiteśvara asks Buddha about the Ten Bodhisattva Stages and ] Each stage represents a decisive advance in understanding and spiritual attainment. The questioner here is Avalokiteśvara, the embodiment of compassion. The main meditative practice is the six perfections - generosity, ethics, patience, effort, concentration and wisdom - the essence of the Bodhisattva's training. (for details pls see pp 249-271)) for advice on the practice of the Perfection of Wisdom.

The longer sūtra then describes, while the shorter opens with, the liberation of Avalokiteśvara, gained while practicing the paramita of prajña (wisdom), seeing the fundamental emptiness (śūnyatā) of the five skandhas: form (rūpa), feeling (vedanā), perceptions (saṃjñā), volitions (saṅkhāra), and consciousness (vijñāna).

==== Form is emptiness ====
Avalokiteśvara addresses Śaripūtra, who was the promulgator of abhidharma according to the scriptures and texts of the Sarvastivada and other early Buddhist schools, having been singled out by the Buddha to receive those teachings. Avalokiteśvara famously states, "Form is empty (śūnyatā). Emptiness is form", and declares the other skandhas to be equally empty of the most fundamental Buddhist teachings such as the Four Noble Truths and explains that in emptiness none of these notions apply. This is interpreted according to the two truths doctrine as saying that teachings, while accurate descriptions of conventional truth, are mere statements about reality—they are not reality itself—and that they are therefore not applicable to the ultimate truth that is by definition beyond mental understanding.

The specific sequence of concepts listed in lines 12–20 ("...in emptiness there is no form, no sensation, ... no attainment and no non-attainment") is the same sequence used in the Mūlasarvāstivādin Samyukta Āgama; this sequence differs in comparable texts of other sects. On this basis, Red Pine has argued that the Heart Sūtra is specifically a response to Sarvastivada teachings that, in the sense "phenomena" or its constituents, are real. Lines 12–13 enumerate the five skandhas. Lines 14–15 list the twelve ayatanas or abodes. Line 16 makes a reference to the 18 dhatus or elements of consciousness, using a conventional shorthand of naming only the first (eye) and last (conceptual consciousness) of the elements. Lines 17–18 assert the emptiness of the Twelve Nidānas, the traditional twelve links of dependent origination, using the same shorthand as with the eighteen dhatus. Line 19 refers to the Four Noble Truths.

==== Reliance on the prajnaparamita ====
The bodhisattva, as the archetypal Mahayana Buddhist, relies on the perfection of wisdom, defined in the Mahaprajnaparamita Sūtra to be the wisdom that perceives reality directly without conceptual attachment thereby achieving nirvana. All Buddhas of the three ages (past, present and future) rely on the Perfection of Wisdom to reach unexcelled complete Enlightenment.

==== Unsurpassed knowledge ====
The final lines of the Heart Sūtra can be read in two different ways, depending on the interpretation of the character 咒, zhòu, meaning either mantra (dharani), or "a superlative kind of practical knowledge or incantation (vidyā). According to Attwood, vidyā may be misunderstood, and the concluding mantra may have been a later addition.

Therefore, the Perfection of Wisdom is the all powerful mantra/knowledge, the great enlightening mantra/knowledge, the unexcelled mantra/knowledge, the unequalled mantra/knowledge, able to dispel all suffering. This is true and not false.

==== Conclusion ====
The shorter sūtra concludes with the following mantra:

gate gate pāragate pārasaṃgate bodhi svāhā
(IPA: ɡəteː ɡəteː paːɾəɡəteː paːɾəsəŋɡəte boːdʱɪ sʋaːɦaː)

This mantra has been recorded and transliterated into many languages, including:

- Sanskrit as recorded in Siddham script of the era: 𑖐𑖝𑖸 𑖐𑖝𑖸 𑖢𑖯𑖨𑖐𑖝𑖸 𑖢𑖯𑖨𑖭𑖽𑖐𑖝𑖸 𑖤𑖺𑖠𑖰𑖭𑖿𑖪𑖯𑖮𑖯
- Sanskrit as recorded in modern Devanagari script: गते गते पारगते पारसंगते बोधि स्वाहा
- simplified Chinese: 揭谛揭谛，波罗揭谛，波罗僧揭谛，菩提萨婆诃; traditional Chinese: 揭諦揭諦，波羅揭諦，波羅僧揭諦，菩提薩婆訶; pinyin: Jiēdì jiēdì, bōluójiēdì, bōluósēngjiēdì, pútí sàpóhē
- Vietnamese: Yết đế, yết đế, Ba la yết đế, Ba la tăng yết đế, Bồ đề tát bà ha
- Japanese: 羯諦羯諦、波羅羯諦、波羅僧羯諦、菩提薩婆訶; rōmaji: Gyatei gyatei haragyatei harasōgyatei boji sowaka
- Korean: 아제 아제 바라아제 바라승아제 모지 사바하; romaja: Aje aje bara-aje baraseung-aje moji sabaha
- Tibetan: ག༌ཏེ༌ག༌ཏེ༌པཱ༌ར༌ག༌ཏེ༌པཱ༌ར༌སཾ༌ག༌ཏེ༌བོ༌དྷི༌སྭཱ༌ཧཱ། (gate gate paragate parasangate bodi soha)

Translations of this mantra vary, but include:

- Max Müller (1884) - Gone, gone, gone to the other shore, landed at the other shore, 'O Wisdom Svaha!'
- D.T. Suzuki (1953) - O Bodhi, gone, gone, gone to the other shore, landed at the other shore, Svaha!
- Edward Conze (1958) - Gone, gone, gone beyond, gone altogether beyond, O what an awakening, all-hail!
- Tanahashi and Halifax (2007) - Arriving, arriving, arriving all the way, arriving all the way together: awakening Joy!

In the longer version, Buddha praises Avalokiteśvara for giving the exposition of the Perfection of Wisdom and all gathered rejoice in its teaching. Many schools traditionally have also praised the sūtra by uttering three times the equivalent of "Mahāprajñāpāramitā" after the end of the recitation of the short version.

== Buddhist exegetical works ==
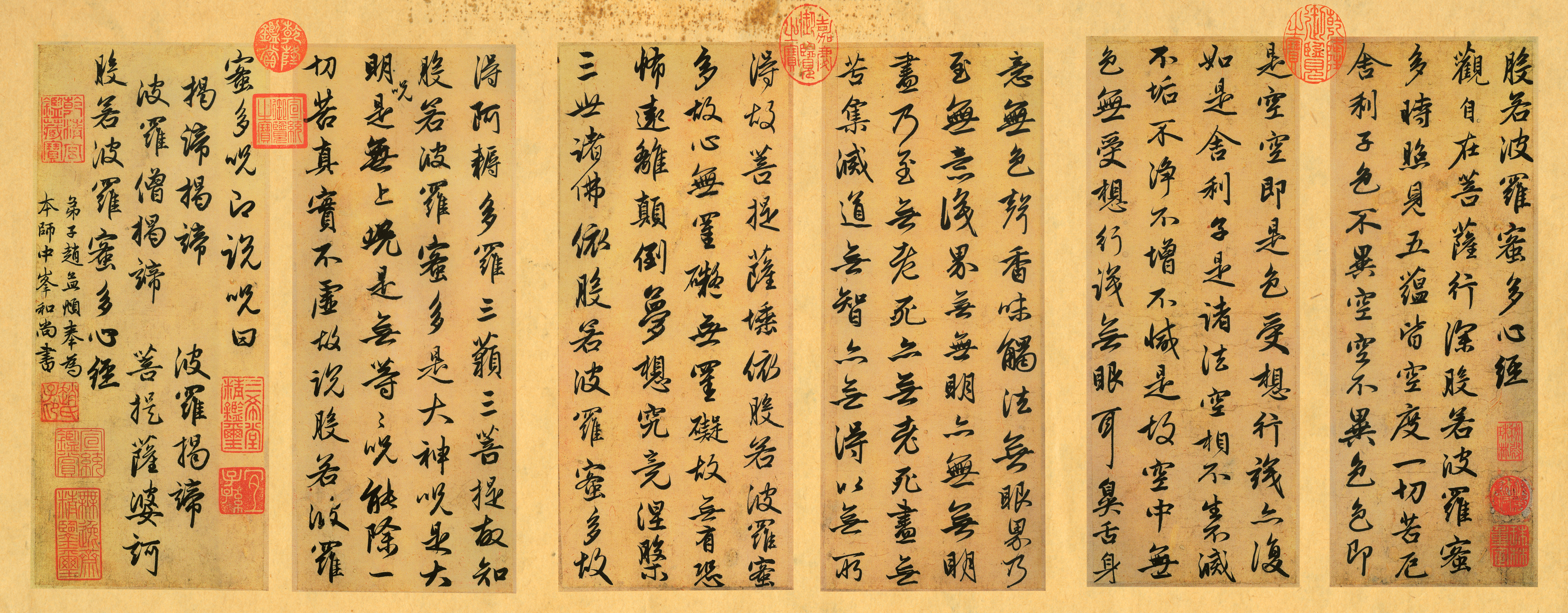
Chinese text of the Heart Sūtra by Yuan dynasty artist and calligrapher Zhao Mengfu (1254–1322 CE)

=== China, Japan, Korea and Vietnam ===
Shinshōgokuraku-ji

Two commentaries of the Heart Sūtra were composed by pupils of Xuanzang, Woncheuk and Kuiji, in the 7th century. These appear to be the earliest extant commentaries on the text. Both have been translated into English. Both Kuiji and Woncheuk's commentaries approach the Heart Sūtra from both a Yogācāra and Madhyamaka viewpoint; however, Kuiji's commentary presents detailed line by line Madhyamaka viewpoints as well and is therefore the earliest surviving Madhyamaka commentary on the Heart Sūtra. Of special note, although Woncheuk did his work in China, he was born in Silla, one of the kingdoms located at the time in Korea. The chief Tang dynasty commentaries have all now been translated into English.

Notable Japanese commentaries include those by Kōbō Daishi (9th Century, Japan), who provides a Shingon commentary by treating the text as a tantra, and Hakuin, who gives a Zen commentary.

There is also a Vietnamese commentarial tradition for the Heart Sūtra. The earliest recorded commentary is the early 14th century Thiền commentary entitled 'Commentary on the Prajñāhṛdaya Sūtra' by Pháp Loa. (Note: Nguyen *gives the Vietnamese title of Phap Loa's commentary as 'Bát Nhã Tâm Kinh Khoa Sớ' which is the Vietnamese reading of the Sino-Viet title (also given) '般若心經科疏'. (The English translation is 'Commentary on the Prajñāhṛdaya Sutra'.) Thich *gives Pháp Loa's name in Chinese as 法螺)

All of the East Asian commentaries are commentaries of Xuanzang's translation of the short version of the Heart Sūtra. Kōbō Daishi's commentary is purportedly of Kumārajīva's translation of the short version of the Heart Sūtra; but upon closer examination seems to quote only from Xuanzang's translation.

Major Chinese language Commentaries on the Heart Sūtra
#	English title (Note: For those interested, the Chinese language titles are as follows: 1. 《般若波羅蜜多心經幽贊》 (2 卷); 2. 《般若波羅蜜多心經贊》 (1 卷); 3. 《般若波羅蜜多略疏》 (1 卷); 4. 《般若心經疏》( 1 卷); 5. 《般若心經疏》( 1 卷); 6. 《般若心経秘鍵》( 1 卷); 7. 《心經直說》( 1 卷); 8. 《心經說》( 29 卷) (參11 卷); 9. 《心經釋要》( 1 卷); 10. 《般若心経毒語》)	Tripitaka No.	Author (Note: For those interested, the CJKV names are as follows: 1. 窺基; 2. 원측; 圓測; 3. 法藏; 4. 靖邁; 5. 慧淨; 6. 空海; 7. 憨山德清; 8. 紫柏真可; 9. 蕅益智旭; 10. 白隠慧鶴)	Date	School (Note: For those interested, the CJKV names are as follows: 1. 窺基; 2. 원측; 圓測; 3. 法藏; 4. 靖邁; 5. 慧淨; 6. 空海; 7. 憨山德清; 8. 紫柏真可; 9. 蕅益智旭; 10. 白隠慧鶴)
1.	Comprehensive Commentary on the Prañāpāramitā Heart Sūtra	T1710	Kuiji	632–682 CE	Yogācāra Buddhism
2.	Prajñāpāramitā Heart Sūtra Commentary	T1711	Woncheuk	613–692 CE	Yogācāra Buddhism
3.	Brief Commentary on the Prajñāpāramitā Heart Sūtra	T1712	Fazang	643–712 CE	Huayan Buddhism
4.	A Commentary on the Prajñāpāramitā Heart Sūtra	M522	Jingmai	c. 7th century	
5.	A Commentary on the Prajñāpāramitā Heart Sūtra	M521	Huijing	715 CE	
6.	Secret Key to the Heart Sūtra	T2203A	Kōbō Daishi	774–835 CE	Shingon Buddhism
7.	Straightforward Explanation of the Heart Sūtra	M542	Hanshan Deqing	1546–1623 CE	Chan Buddhism and Pure Land Buddhism
8.	Explanation of the Heart Sūtra	M1452 (Scroll 11)	Zibo Zhenke	1543–1603 CE	Chan Buddhism
9.	Explanation of the Keypoints to the Heart Sūtra	M555	Ouyi Zhixu	1599–1655 CE	Pure Land Buddhism and Tiantai Buddhism
10.	Explanation of the Contemplation of Phenomena of the Heart Sūtra	X26n0559	Baiting Xufa	1641–1728 CE	Huayan Buddhism
11.	Explanation of the Absolute Nature of the Heart Sūtra	X26n0560	Baiting Xufa	1641–1728 CE	Huayan Buddhism
12.	Zen Words for the Heart	B021	Hakuin Ekaku	1686–1768 CE	Zen Buddhism

=== India ===
Eight Indian commentaries survive in Tibetan translation and have been the subject of two books by Donald Lopez. These typically treat the text either from a Madhyamaka point of view, or as a tantra (esp. Śrīsiṃha). Śrī Mahājana's commentary has a definite "Yogachara bent". All of these commentaries are on the long version of the Heart Sūtra. The Eight Indian Commentaries from the Kangyur are (cf first eight on chart):

Indian Commentaries on the Heart Sūtra from Tibetan and Chinese language Sources
#	English title (Note: For those interested, the Sanskrit titles are as follows: 1.Āryaprajñāpāramitāhṛdayaṭīkā 2.Prajñāhṛdayaṭīkā 3.Prajñāpāramitāhṛdayamaṭīkā 4.Mantravivṛtaprajñāhṛdayavṛtti 5.Āryaprajñāpāramitāhṛdayavyākhyā 6.Āryaprajñāpāramitāhṛdayaṭīkā 7.Prajñāpāramitāhṛdayārthamaparijñāna 8.Bhagavatīprajñāpāramitāhṛdayathapradīpanāmaṭīkā 9.Prajñāpāramitāhṛdayaṭīkā)	Peking Tripitaka No.	Author / Dates
1.	Vast Explanation of the Noble Heart of the Perfection of Wisdom	No. 5217	Vimalamitra (b. Western India fl. c. 797 CE – 810 CE)
2,	Atīśa's Explanation of the Heart Sūtra	No. 5222	Atīśa (b. Eastern India, 982 CE – 1045 CE)
3.	Commentary on the Heart of the Perfection of Wisdom	No. 5221	Kamalaśīla (740 CE – 795 CE)
4.	Commentary on the Heart Sūtra as Mantra	No. 5840	Śrīsiṃha (probably 8th century CE) (Note: Lopez Jr.: [Vairocana, a disciple of Srisimha was] ordained by Śāntarakṣita at bSam yas c. 779 CE.)
5.	Explanation of the Noble Heart of the Perfection of Wisdom	No. 5218	Jñānamitra (c. 10th–11th century CE)
6.	Vast Commentary on the Noble Heart of the Perfection of Wisdom	No. 5220	Praśāstrasena
7.	Complete Understanding of the Heart of the Perfection of Wisdom	No. 5223	Śrī Mahājana (probably c. 11th century)
8.	Commentary on the Bhagavati (Mother of all Buddhas) Heart of the Perfection of Wisdom Sūtra, Lamp of the Meaning	No. 5219	Vajrāpaṇi (probably c. 11th century CE)
9.	Commentary on the Heart of the Perfection of Wisdom	M526	Āryadeva (or Deva) c. 10th century (Note: Zhou 1959 : (not the famous Āryadeva from the 3rd century CE but another monk with a similar name from c. 10th century))

There is one surviving Chinese translation of an Indian commentary in the Chinese Buddhist Canon. Āryadeva's commentary is on the short version of the Heart Sūtra.

=== Other ===
Besides the Tibetan translation of Indian commentaries on the Heart Sūtra, Tibetan monk-scholars also made their own commentaries. One example is Tāranātha's A Textual Commentary on the Heart Sūtra.

In modern times, the text has become increasingly popular amongst exegetes as a growing number of translations and commentaries attest. The Heart Sūtra was already popular in various East Asian Buddhist traditions such as Chan, Zen, Shingon and Tendai Buddhism, but it has also become a staple for Tibetan Buddhist Lamas as well.

=== Selected English translations ===
The first English translation was presented to the Royal Asiatic Society in 1863 by Samuel Beal, and published in their journal in 1865. Beal used a Chinese text corresponding to T251 and a 9th Century Chan commentary by Dadian Baotong (大顛寶通) [c. 815 CE]. In 1881, Max Müller published a Sanskrit text based on the Hōryū-ji manuscript along an English translation.

There are more than 40 published English translations of the Heart Sūtra from Sanskrit, Chinese, and Tibetan, beginning with Beal (1865). Almost every year new translations and commentaries are published. The following is a representative sample.

Author	Title	Publisher	Notes	Year	ISBN
Geshe Rabten	Echoes of Voidness	Wisdom	Includes the Heart Sūtra with Tibetan Buddhist commentary	1983	ISBN 0-86171-010-X
Donald S. Lopez Jr.	The Heart Sūtra Explained	SUNY	The Heart Sūtra with a summary of Indian Buddhist commentaries	1987	ISBN 0-88706-590-2
Thich Nhat Hanh	The Heart of Understanding "Translation amended 2014". 13 September 2014.	Parallax Press	The Heart Sūtra with a Vietnamese Thiền commentary	1988	ISBN 0-938077-11-2
Norman Waddell	Zen Words for the Heart: Hakuin's Commentary on the Heart Sūtra	Shambhala Publications	Hakuin Ekaku's Japanese Zen commentary on Heart Sūtra	1996	ISBN 978-1-57062-165-9
Donald S. Lopez Jr.	Elaborations on Emptiness	Princeton	The Heart Sūtra with eight complete Indian and Tibetan Buddhist commentaries	1998	ISBN 0-691-00188-X
Edward Conze	Buddhist Wisdom: The Diamond Sūtra and The Heart Sūtra	Random House	The Diamond Sūtra and The Heart Sūtra, along with commentaries on the texts and practices of Buddhism	2001	ISBN 978-0-375-72600-2
Chan Master Sheng Yen	There Is No Suffering: A Commentary on the Heart Sūtra	Dharma Drum Publications	English translation of the Heart Sūtra with a Chinese Chan commentary	2001	ISBN 1-55643-385-9
Tetsugen Bernard Glassman	Infinite Circle: Teachings in Zen	Shambhala Publications	Translations and commentaries of The Heart Sūtra and The Identity of Relative and Absolute as well as Zen precepts	2003	ISBN 978-1-59030-079-4
Geshe Sonam Rinchen	Heart Sūtra: An Oral Commentary	Snow Lion	Concise translation and commentary from a Tibetan Buddhist perspective	2003	ISBN 978-1-55939-201-3
Red Pine	The Heart Sūtra: the Womb of Buddhas	Counterpoint	Heart Sūtra with commentary	2004	ISBN 978-1-59376-009-0
14th Dalai Lama	Essence of the Heart Sūtra	Wisdom Publications	Heart Sūtra with commentary by the 14th Dalai Lama	2005	ISBN 978-0-86171-284-7
Geshe Tashi Tsering	Emptiness: The Foundation of Buddhist Thought	Wisdom Publications	A guide to the topic of emptiness from a Tibetan Buddhist perspective, with English translation of the Heart Sūtra	2009	ISBN 978-0-86171-511-4
Geshe Kelsang Gyatso	The New Heart of Wisdom: An explanation of the Heart Sūtra	Tharpa Publications	English translation of the Heart Sūtra with commentary	2012	ISBN 978-1-906665-04-3
Karl Brunnholzl	The Heart Attack Sūtra: A New Commentary on the Heart Sūtra	Shambhala Publications	Modern commentary	2012	ISBN 978-1-55939-391-1
Doosun Yoo	Thunderous Silence: A Formula For Ending Suffering: A Practical Guide to the Heart Sūtra	Wisdom Publications	English translation of the Heart Sūtra with Korean Seon commentary	2013	ISBN 978-1-61429-053-7
Kazuaki Tanahashi	The Heart Sūtra: A Comprehensive Guide to the Classic of Mahayana Buddhism	Shambhala Publications	English translation of the Heart Sūtra with history and commentary	2015	ISBN 978-1-61180-096-8

=== Recordings ===
Japanese recitation by a head priest of the Rinzai Zen tradition and dankas at Kezōin in Soja, Okayama, Japan

Mandarin Chinese recitation by a Chinese Buddhist jushi (layperson)

The Heart Sūtra has been set to music a number of times. Many singers solo this sūtra.

- The Buddhist Audio Visual Production Centre (佛教視聽製作中心) produced a Cantonese album of recordings of the Heart Sūtra in 1995 featuring a number of Hong Kong pop singers, including Alan Tam, Anita Mui and Faye Wong, and composed by Andrew Lam Man Chung (林敏聰) to raise money to rebuild the Chi Lin Nunnery.
- Malaysian Imee Ooi (黄慧音) sings the short version of the Heart Sūtra in Sanskrit, accompanied by meditative music entitled 'The Shore Beyond, Prajna Paramita Hrdaya Sūtram', released in 2009, popularizing the Sanskrit version worldwide. She has also sung the Heart Sutra in Cantonese and Mandarin and is part of the modernization of Buddhist Chant wave starting from the 1990s across East and Southeast Asia.
- Hong Kong pop singers, such as the Four Heavenly Kings, sang the Heart Sūtra to raise money for relief efforts related to the 1999 Jiji earthquake.
- A Mandarin version was first performed by Faye Wong in May 2009 at the Famen Temple for the opening of the Namaste Dagoba, a stupa housing the finger relic of Buddha rediscovered at the Famen Temple. She has sung this version numerous times since and its recording was subsequently used as a theme song in the blockbusters Aftershock (2010) and Xuanzang (2016).
- Shaolin monk Shi Yan Ming recites the Sūtra at the end of the song "Life Changes" by the Wu-Tang Clan, in remembrance of the deceased member ODB.
- The outro of the b-side song "Ghetto Defendant" by the British first wave punk band The Clash also features the Heart Sūtra, recited by American beat poet Allen Ginsberg.
- An Esperanto translation of portions of the text furnished the libretto of the cantata La Koro Sutro by American composer Lou Harrison.
- The Heart Sūtra appears as a track on an album of sūtras "performed" by VOCALOID voice software, using the Nekomura Iroha voice pack. The album, Syncretism of Shinto and Buddhism by VOCALOID, is by the artist tamachang.

== Popular culture ==
In the centuries following the historical Xuanzang, an extended tradition of literature fictionalizing the life of Xuanzang and glorifying his special relationship with the Heart Sūtra arose, of particular note being Journey to the West, which was written in the 16th century during the Ming dynasty. In chapter nineteen of Journey to the West, the fictitious Xuanzang learns by heart the Heart Sūtra after hearing it recited one time by the Crow's Nest Chan Master, who flies down from his tree perch with a scroll containing it, and offers to impart it. A full text of the Heart Sūtra is quoted in this fictional account.

The 1782 Japanese text "The Secret Biwa Music that Caused the Yurei to Lament" (琵琶秘曲泣幽霊), commonly known as Hoichi the Earless, because of its inclusion in the 1904 book Kwaidan: Stories and Studies of Strange Things, makes usage of this sūtra. It involves the titular Hoichi having his whole body painted with the Heart Sūtra to protect against malicious spirits, with the accidental exception of his ears, making him vulnerable nonetheless. A filmed adaptation of this story is included in the 1964 horror anthology Kwaidan.

In the 2003 Korean film Spring, Summer, Fall, Winter...and Spring, the apprentice is ordered by his Master to carve the Chinese characters of the sūtra into the wooden monastery deck to quiet his heart.

The Sanskrit mantra of the Heart Sūtra was used as the lyrics for the opening theme song of the 2011 Chinese television series Journey to the West.

The 2013 Buddhist film Avalokitesvara tells the origins of Mount Putuo, the famous pilgrimage site for the bodhisattva Avalokitesvara in China. The film was filmed onsite on Mount Putuo and featured several segments where monks chant the Heart Sūtra in Chinese and Sanskrit. Egaku, the protagonist of the film, also chants the Heart Sūtra in Japanese.

In the 2015 Japanese film I Am a Monk, Koen, a twenty-four year old bookstore clerk, becomes a Shingon monk at the Eifuku-ji after the death of his grandfather. The Eifuku-ji is the fifty-seventh temple in the eighty-eight temple Shikoku Pilgrimage Circuit. He is at first unsure of himself. However, during his first service as he chants the Heart Sūtra, he comes to an important realization.

Bear McCreary recorded four Japanese-American monks chanting the entire Heart Sūtra in Japanese in his sound studio. He picked a few discontinuous segments and digitally enhanced them for their hypnotic sound effect. The result became the main theme of King Ghidorah in the 2019 film Godzilla: King of the Monsters.

Since 2010, a large number of musical arrangements of the Heart Sutra went viral on Japanese social media and video-sharing platforms, especially Nico Nico Douga. These mainly include rearrangements of the track featuring Hatsune Miku, a virtual Vocaloid idol, reciting the sutra in various musical styles, as well as vocal and instrumental covers.

== Influence on western philosophy ==
Schopenhauer, in the final words of his main work, compared his doctrine to the Śūnyatā of the Heart Sūtra. In Volume 1, § 71 of The World as Will and Representation, Schopenhauer wrote: "...to those in whom the will [to continue living] has turned and has denied itself, this very real world of ours, with all its suns and Milky Ways, is—nothing." To this, he appended the following note: "This is also the Prajna–Paramita of the Buddhists, the 'beyond all knowledge,' in other words, the point where subject and object no longer exist."

== See also ==
- Mahāyāna sūtras
- Prajñāpāramitā
- Life-Extending Ten-Line Kannon Sutra

== Sources ==
- Attwood, Jayarava (2017). "Epithets of the Mantra in the Heart Sutra". Journal of the Oxford Centre for Buddhist Studies 12 (2017a): 26–57. 12.
- Buddhist Text Translation Society (2002). Daily Recitation Handbook: Sagely City of Ten Thousand Buddhas. Dharma Realm Buddhist Association. ISBN 0-88139-857-8.
- Brunnhölzl, Karl (September 29, 2017). "The Heart Sutra Will Change You Forever". Lion's Roar.
- Buswell, Robert E. Jr. (2003). Encyclopedia of Buddhism. MacMillan Reference Books. ISBN 0-02-865718-7.
- Buswell, Robert E. Jr.; Lopez, Donald S. Jr. (2014). The Princeton Dictionary of Buddhism. Princeton University Press. ISBN 978-0-691-15786-3.
- Choo, B. Hyun (February 2006). "An English Translation of the Banya paramilda simgyeong chan: Wonch'uk's Commentary on the Heart Sūtra (Prajñāpāramitā-hṛdaya-sūtra)". International Journal of Buddhist Thought & Culture. 6: 121–205.
- Conze, Edward (1948). "Text, Sources, and Bibliography of the Prajñāpāramitā-hṛdaya". Journal of the Royal Asiatic Society. 80 (1): 33–51. doi:10.1017/S0035869X00101686. JSTOR 25222220. S2CID 163066931.
- Conze, Edward (1967). "The Prajñāpāramitā-Hṛdaya Sūtra". Thirty Years of Buddhist Studies: Selected Essays. Bruno Cassirer. pp. 147–167.
- Conze, Edward (1975). Buddhist Wisdom Books: Containing the "Diamond Sutra" and the "Heart Sutra". Thorsons. ISBN 0-04-294090-7.
- Conze, Edward (2000) [1960, Mouton & Co.]. Prajnaparamita Literature. Munshiram Manoharlal Publishers. ISBN 81-215-0992-0.
- Conze, Edward (2003). The Short Prajñāpāramitā Texts. Buddhist Publishing Group. ISBN 978-0-946672-28-8.
- Dreitlein, Thomas Eijō (2011). "An Annotated Translation of Kūkai's Secret Key to the Heart Sūtra" (PDF). 高野山大学密教文化研究所紀要 [Bulletin of the Research Institute of Esoteric Buddhist Culture]. 24: 1–48(L).
- "Sanskrit Version of Heart Sutra and Vijaya Dharani", e-Museum, 2018, archived from the original on 2018-11-22
- Foguangshan Foundation for Buddhist Culture and Education (佛光山文教基金會) (1989). 佛光山大詞典 [Foguangshan Dictionary of Buddhism] (in Traditional Chinese). 佛光山文教基金會出版. ISBN 978-957-457-195-6.
- Fukuda, Ryosei (福田亮成) (1964). 般若理趣經・智友Jñānamitra釋における一・二の問題 [A Few Problems with Jñānamitra's Commentary on the Adhyardhaśatikā prajñāpāramitā]. Journal of Indian and Buddhist Studies (Indogaku Bukkyogaku Kenkyu) (in Japanese). 12 (23). Journal of Indian and Buddhist Studies: 144–145. doi:10.4259/ibk.12.144.
- Fukui, Fumimasa (福井文雅) (1987). 般若心経の歴史的研究 [Study of the History of the Prajñāpāramitā Sūtra] (in Japanese, Chinese, and English). Tokyo: Shunjūsha (春秋社). ISBN 978-4-393-11128-4.
- Hakeda, Y.S. (1972). Kūkai, Major works: Translated and with an account of his life and a study of his thought. New York: Columbia University Press. ISBN 978-0-231-05933-6. "esp. pp 262–276 which has the English translation of Secret Key to the Heart Sutra"
- Harada, Waso (原田和宗) (2002). 梵文『小本・般若心経』和訳 [An Annotated Translation of The Prajñāpāramitāhṛdaya]. 密教文化 (in Japanese). 2002 (209). Association of Esoteric Buddhist Studies: L17–L62. doi:10.11168/jeb1947.2002.209_L17.
- Harada, Waso (原田和宗) (2010). 「般若心経」の成立史論」 [History of the Establishment of Prajñāpāramitāhṛdayasūtram] (in Japanese). Tokyo: Daizō-shuppan 大蔵出版. ISBN 978-4-8043-0577-6.
- He, Ming (贺铭); Xu, Xiao yu (续小玉) (2017). "2" 早期《心经》的版本 [Early Editions of the Heart Sutra]. In Wang, Meng nan (王梦楠); Fangshan Stone Sutra Museum (房山石经博物馆); Fangshan Stone Sutra and Yunju Temple Culture Research Center (房山石经与云居寺文化研究中心) (eds.). 石经研究 第一辑 [Research on Stone Sutras Part I] (in Simplified Chinese). Vol. 1. Beijing Yanshan Press. pp. 12–28. ISBN 978-7-5402-4394-4.
- Ishii, Kōsei (石井 公成) (2015). 『般若心経』をめぐる諸問題: ジャン・ナティエ氏の玄奘創作説を疑う [Issues Surrounding the Prajñāpāramitā-hṛdaya: Doubts Concerning Jan Nattier's Theory of a Composition by Xuanzang]. Vol. 64. Translated by Kotyk, Jeffrey. 印度學佛教學研究. pp. 499–492.
- The Scripture on the Explication of the Underlying Meaning [Saṁdhinirmocana Sūtra]. Translated by Keenan, John P.; Shi, Xuanzang [from Sanskrit to Chinese]. Numata Center for Buddhist Translation and Research. 2006. ISBN 978-1-886439-10-8. "Translated from Chinese"
- Kelsang Gyatso, Geshe (2001). Heart of Wisdom: An Explanation of the Heart Sutra (4th ed.). Tharpa Publications. ISBN 978-0-948006-77-7.
- Liao, Bensheng (廖本聖) (1997). 蓮花戒《般若波羅蜜多心經釋》之譯注研究 (廖本聖著) [Research on the Translation of Kamalaśīla's Prajñāpāramitāhṛdayamaṭīkā]. Chung-Hwa Buddhist Journal. 10 (in Traditional Chinese): 83–123.
- Lin, Tony K. (林光明); Lin, Josephine (林怡馨), eds. (2020). 梵藏漢心經 [The Heart Sutra in Sanskrit, Tibetan and Chinese] (in Traditional Chinese). Taipei: Sbooker Publications 布克出版事業部. ISBN 978-986-5405-82-3.
- Lopez, Donald S. Jr. (1988), The Heart Sutra Explained: Indian and Tibetan Commentaries, State Univ of New York Pr., ISBN 0-88706-589-9
- Lopez, Donald S. Jr. (1996), Elaborations on Emptiness: Uses of the Heart Sūtra, New Jersey: Princeton University Press, ISBN 978-0-691-00188-3
- Luk, Charles (1970), Ch'an and Zen Teaching (Series I), Berkeley: Shambala, pp. 211–224, ISBN 0-87773-009-1 (cf pp 211–224 for tr. of Hanshan Deqing's Straight Talk on the Heart Sutra (Straightforward Explanation of the Heart Sutra))
- Lusthaus, Dan (2003). "The Heart Sūtra in Chinese Yogācāra: Some Comparative Comments on the Heart Sūtra Commentaries of Wŏnch'ŭk and K'uei-chi". International Journal of Buddhist Thought & Culture. 3: 59–103.
- McRae, John (2004), "Heart Sutra", in Buswell Jr., Robert E. (ed.), Encyclopedia of Buddhism, MacMillan
- Minoru Kiyota (1978). Mahayana Buddhist Meditation: Theory and Practice Hawaii: University of Hawaii Press. (esp. Cook, Francis H. 'Fa-tsang's Brief Commentary on the Prajñāpāramitā-hṛdaya-sūtra.' pp. 167–206.) ISBN 978-81-208-0760-0
- Müller, Max (1881). 'The Ancient Palm Leaves containing the Prajñāpāramitā-Hṛidaya Sūtra and Uṣniṣa-vijaya-Dhāraṇi.' in Buddhist Texts from Japan (Vol 1.iii). Oxford University Press. Online
- Nattier, Jan (1992), "The Heart Sūtra: A Chinese Apocryphal Text?", Journal of the International Association of Buddhist Studies, vol. 15, no. 2, pp. 153–223, archived from the original on 2013-10-29
- Nguyen, Tai Thu (2008). The History of Buddhism in Vietnam. Institute of Philosophy, Vietnamese Academy of Social Sciences-The Council for Research in Values and Philosophy. ISBN 978-1-56518-098-7.
- Pine, Red (2004), The Heart Sutra: The Womb of the Buddhas, Shoemaker 7 Hoard, ISBN 1-59376-009-4
- Wisdom of Buddha The Saṁdhinirmocana Mahāyāna Sūtra. Translated by Powers, John. Dharma Publishing. 1995. ISBN 978-0-89800-246-1. "Translated from Tibetan"
- Rinpoche, Tai Situ (2005), Ground, Path and Fruition, Zhyisil Chokyi Ghatsal Chatitable Trust, ISBN 978-1-877294-35-8
- Shih, Heng-Ching & Lusthaus, Dan (2006). A Comprehensive Commentary on the Heart Sutra (Prajnaparamita-hyrdaya-sutra). Numata Center for Buddhist Translation & Research. ISBN 978-1-886439-11-5
- Siu, Sai yau (蕭世友) (2017). 略本《般若波羅蜜多心經》重探：漢譯，譯史及文本類型 [Reinvestigation into the Shorter Heart Sūtra: Chinese Translation, History, and Text Type] (in Traditional Chinese). Chinese University of Hong Kong.
- Sonam Gyaltsen Gonta, Geshe (索南格西); Shithar, Kunchok(貢卻斯塔); Saito, Yasutaka（齋藤保高） (2009). チベットの般若心経 西藏的般若心經 [The Tibetan Heart Sutra] (in Traditional Chinese). Translated by 凃, 玉盞 (Tu Yuzhan). (Original language in Japanese). Taipei: Shangzhou Press (商周出版). ISBN 978-986-6369-65-0.
- Storch, Tanya (2014). The History of Chinese Buddhist Bibliography: Censorship and Transformation of the Tripitaka. Amherst, New York: Cambria Press. ISBN 978-1-60497-877-3.
- Tanahashi, Kazuki (2014), The Heart Sutra: A Comprehensive Guide to the Classic of Mahayana Buddhism', Shambala Publications, ISBN 978-1-61180-312-9
- Thích, Thiện Ân (1979). Buddhism and Zen in Vietnam in relation to the development of Buddhism in Asia. Charles E.Tuttle & Co. ISBN 978-0-8048-1144-6.
- Waddell, Norman (1996). Zen Words for the Heart: Hakuin's Commentary on the Heart Sutra. Boston, Massachusetts: Shambhala. ISBN 978-1-57062-165-9.
- "Prajnaparamita Heart Sutra" (PDF). Translated by Yifa, Venerable; Owens, M.C.; Romaskiewicz, P.M. Buddha's Light Publishing. 2005.
- Yu, Anthony C. (1980). The Journey to the West. Chicago and London: The University of Chicago Press. ISBN 978-0-226-97150-6. First published 1977
- Xizai (1982). "Fó shuō shèng fó mǔ xiǎo zì bo re bō luó mì duō jīng" 佛說聖佛母小字般若波羅蜜多經 [Svalpākṣarā prajñāpāramitāsūtra] (PDF). College of Liberal Arts, National Taiwan University – Digital Library and Museum of Buddhist Studies. Taisho 258 (in Chinese). Translated by Tian Xizai (天息災). Archived from the original (PDF) on 2020-01-13.
- Zhou, Zhi'an (周止菴) (1959). 般若波羅蜜多心經詮注 [Commentaries on the Prañāpāramitāhṛdaya Sutra] (in Traditional Chinese). Taichung: The Regent Store.
