= Tharpa Publications =

Tharpa Publications (Sanskrit for "liberation"; pronounced "Tar-pa") is the publishing arm of the New Kadampa Tradition, a Buddhist new religious movement. Since 1988, it has solely published the work of its founder, Kelsang Gyatso. Tharpa Publications is a non-profit corporation founded in 1985 at the Manjushri Institute, with bases in Ulverston, UK and New York City.

The New Kadampa Tradition exclusively uses the texts authored by Geshe Gyatso and published by Tharpa. These include Buddhist meditation books such as The New Meditation Handbook, books on the Buddhist way of life such as Universal Compassion, books on Buddhist philosophy and psychology such as Heart of Wisdom, and books on Buddhist Tantra. The press has affiliates in Brazil, the USA, Spain, Mexico, France, Canada, Australia, Hong Kong and South Africa.

== Kelsang Gyatso ==
To date, Tharpa has published 22 of his books, covering the entire range of Buddha Shakyamuni's Sutra and Tantra teachings in English. Kelsang Gyatso's books aim to make Buddhist texts accessible for Western audiences, and include titles such as How to Solve Our Human Problems, Universal Compassion and Mahamudra Tantra.

Stephen Batchelor says that Kelsang Gyatso's books are written with "considerable clarity." David Braizer says that Kelsang writes "excellent" books that are "an important contribution to Western understanding of Buddhism and its traditions".

D. Cozort says that Guide to Dakini Land and Essence of Vajrayana are "the most detailed and revealing commentary on specific tantric practices yet to be published in a Western language", but generally criticizes Gyatso's emphasis on "only one voice and one point of view" in New Kadampa Tradition training materials. In his book review of Guide to Dakini Land, Richard Guard praised the book's editing and conciseness, and said: "Geshe Kelsang has truly brought a blessing into our lives."

Australian scholar John Powers said Ocean of Nectar: Wisdom and Compassion in Mahàyàna Buddhism was "sectarian and uncritical work" at odds with Buddhist scholarship and Tibetology, but he noted that it was a comprehensive presentation of traditional Gelug commentaries on Chandrakirti. Writing in The Guardian, Vishpani Blomfield said, "These books offer succinct formulations of Buddhist doctrines that are enlivened by everyday examples but make few concessions to the perspectives of science or modern scholarship."

== New Kadampa Tradition ==
Tharpa Publications is part of the New Kadampa Tradition - International Kadampa Buddhist Union, a Buddhist new religious movement. It was established in 1985 by Kelsang Gyatso. Its headquarters are at Conishead Priory, Ulverston, UK.

The teachings in Tharpa's books are based on the Gelugpa lineage of Pabongkhapa Déchen Nyingpo and Trijang Lobsang Yeshe Tenzin Gyatso. For example, Joyful Path of Good Fortune is a modern equivalent of Liberation in the Palm of Your Hand, written by Je Phabongkhapa and edited by Trijang Rinpoche.

Tharpa Publications' classic textbooks are used as the basis of the New Kadampa Tradition's Foundation Program and Teacher Training Program, intended for dedicated students.

== Finances ==
When it was first founded, Tharpa Publications lost money, until the late 1990s. Kelsang Gyatso says that, since that time, he has donated all royalties from Tharpa's books to New Kadampa Tradition's non-profit organizations, including the Manjushri Institute and its International Temples' Fund.

== Publications ==
The following titles were written by Kelsang Gyatso, and are presented in their original publication order:

- Meaningful to Behold: The Bodhisattva's Way of Life, Tharpa Publications (5th. ed., 2008) ISBN 978-1-906665-11-1
- Clear Light of Bliss: Tantric Meditation Manual, Tharpa Publications (2nd. ed., 1992) ISBN 978-0-948006-21-0
- Heart of Wisdom: An Explanation of the Heart Sutra, Tharpa Publications (4th. ed., 2001) ISBN 978-0-948006-77-7
- Universal Compassion: Inspiring Solutions for Difficult Times, Tharpa Publications (4th. ed., 2002) ISBN 978-0-948006-72-2
- The New Meditation Handbook: Meditations to Make Our Life Happy and Meaningful, Tharpa Publications (2003) ISBN 978-0-9817277-1-4
- Joyful Path of Good Fortune: The Complete Buddhist Path to Enlightenment, Tharpa Publications (2nd. ed., 1995) ISBN 978-0-948006-46-3
- Guide to Dakini Land: The Highest Yoga Tantra Practice of Buddha Vajrayogini, Tharpa Publications (2nd. ed., 1996) ISBN 978-0-948006-39-5
- The Bodhisattva Vow: A Practical Guide to Helping Others, Tharpa Publications (2nd. ed., 1995) ISBN 978-0-948006-50-0
- Heart Jewel: The Essential Practices of Kadampa Buddhism, Tharpa Publications (2nd. ed., 1997) ISBN 978-0-948006-56-2
- Great Treasury of Merit: How to Rely Upon a Spiritual Guide, Tharpa Publications (1992) ISBN 978-0-948006-22-7
- Introduction to Buddhism: An Explanation of the Buddhist Way of Life, Tharpa Publications (2nd. ed., 2001, US ed. 2008) ISBN 978-0-9789067-7-1
- Understanding the Mind: The Nature and Power of the Mind, Tharpa Publications (2nd. ed., 1997) ISBN 978-0-948006-78-4
- Tantric Grounds and Paths: How to Enter, Progress on, and Complete the Vajrayana Path, Tharpa Publications (1994) ISBN 978-0-948006-33-3
- Ocean of Nectar: The True Nature of All Things, Tharpa Publications (1995) ISBN 978-0-948006-23-4
- Essence of Vajrayana: The Highest Yoga Tantra Practice of Heruka Body Mandala, Tharpa Publications (1997) ISBN 978-0-948006-48-7
- Living Meaningfully, Dying Joyfully: The Profound Practice of Transference of Consciousness, Tharpa Publications (1999) ISBN 978-0-948006-63-0
- Eight Steps to Happiness: The Buddhist Way of Loving Kindness, Tharpa Publications (2000) ISBN 978-0-9817277-8-3
- Transform Your Life: A Blissful Journey, Tharpa Publications (2001, US ed. 2007) ISBN 978-0-9789067-4-0
- How to Solve Our Human Problems: The Four Noble Truths, Tharpa Publications (2005, US ed., 2007) ISBN 978-0-9789067-1-9
- Mahamudra Tantra: The Supreme Heart Jewel Nectar, Tharpa Publications (2005) ISBN 978-0-948006-93-7
- Guide to the Bodhisattva's Way of Life: How to Enjoy a Life of Great Meaning and Altruism, a translation of Shantideva's Bodhisattvacharyavatara with Neil Elliott, Tharpa Publications (2002) ISBN 978-0-948006-88-3

Tharpa Publications was originally a general Buddhist publishing house, also releasing the following works by other authors:

- The Eternal Legacy: An Introduction to the Canonical Literature of Buddhism, Tharpa Publications (1985) by Sangharakshita, ISBN 0-948006-02-1.
- A Survey of Buddhism: Its Doctrines and Methods through the Ages, Tharpa Publications (1987) by Sangharakshita, ISBN 0-948006-01-3 .
- Treasury of Dharma: A Tibetan Buddhist Meditation Course, Tharpa Publications (1988) by Geshe Rabten, ISBN 0-948006-04-8.

In addition to publishing books, Tharpa also supplies audio books, Buddhist art, and sadhanas for prayer and meditation.

The 'half-drop' repeat patterns used in some NKT-IKBU artwork as well as sadhana covers, such as the peony-style flower and emblem of Manjushri (a sword and book upon a lotus) were designed by Robert Beer.

== Sources ==
=== General ===
- Blomfield, Vishvapani (2022-10-14). "Kelsang Gyatso obituary". The Guardian. ISSN 0261-3077.
- Bluck, Robert (2006). British Buddhism: Teachings, practice and development (PDF). Routledge critical studies in Buddhism. London: Routledge Curzon. ISBN 1134158173. Archived from the original on 8 August 2014.
- Buddhist Publisher Reaps Profits of Enlightenment by Alison Eadie (1993-04-18), The Independent, retrieved 2009-12-20.
- Cozort, Daniel (2003). "The Making of the Western Lama". In Prebish, Charles S.; Heine, Steven (eds.). Buddhism in the modern world: Adaptations of an ancient tradition. Oxford University Press. pp. 221–248. ISBN 0198033575.
- Powers, John (1996). "Review: Wisdom and Compassion in Mahāyāna Buddhism" (PDF). Journal of Buddhist Ethics. 3. ISSN 1076-9005.
- Waterhouse, Helen (1997). Authority and adaptation: a case study in British Buddhism (PDF) (Ph.D.). Bath Spa University.

=== Book reviews ===
- Guide to Dakini Land: A Commentary to the Highest Yoga Tantra Practice of Vajrayogini, reviewed by Richard Guard. Tibetan Journal (Autumn 1991), pp. 80–83.
- How to Solve Our Human Problems: The Four Noble Truths, reviewed by Frederic and Mary Ann Brussat, retrieved 2009-08-27.
- How to Solve Our Human Problems: The Four Noble Truths, reviewed by Publishers Weekly, retrieved 2009-08-27.
- Introduction to Buddhism: An Explanation of the Buddhist Way of Life, reviewed by Foreword Magazine's Pam Kingsbury, retrieved 2018-10-30.
- The New Meditation Handbook: Meditations to Make Our Life Happy and Meaningful, reviewed by Frederic and Mary Ann Brussat, retrieved 2009-08-27.
- The New Meditation Handbook: Meditations to Make Our Life Happy and Meaningful, reviewed by Foreword Magazine's Duncan Sprattmoran, retrieved 2018-10-30.
- Ocean of Nectar: Wisdom and Compassion in Mahayana Buddhism, reviewed by John Powers, retrieved 2009-05-22.
- Understanding the Mind: The Nature and Power of the Mind, reviewed by Scott Bishop, retrieved 2009-12-20.
