= Manjushri Institute =

Manjushri Institute was a large Buddhist college situated at Conishead Priory in Cumbria, England from 1976 until its dissolution in 1991. In 1991 its assets, including Conishead Priory, were transferred to a new centre on the same premises, Manjushri Mahayana Buddhist Centre, which was later renamed Manjushri Kadampa Meditation Centre.

== Founding ==
In 1976 the students of Lama Thubten Yeshe founded the Manjushri Institute, a registered charitable company with Lama Yeshe as the spiritual director and purchased the assets of Conishead Priory, a neglected Victorian mansion in Ulverston, Cumbria, England for the price of £70,000. In the same year Lama Thubten Yeshe and Lama Zopa Rinpoche visited Geshe Kelsang Gyatso in India and invited him to teach at the Manjushri Institute, which was a part of their FPMT network. According to David Kay, they sought the advice of the 14th Dalai Lama when choosing Geshe Kelsang. At first Geshe Kelsang appears to have been reluctant to accept this invitation, but "Lama Yeshe requested Kyabje Trijang Rinpoche [Geshe Kelsang's Teacher] to ask Geshe Kelsang to become Resident Teacher of Manjushri Institute. Geshe Kelsang later recounted that Kyabje Trijang Rinpoche asked him to go to England, teach Shantideva's Guide to the Bodhisattva's Way of Life, Chandrakirti's Guide to the Middle Way and Lamrim, and then check whether there was any meaning in his continuing to stay."

Geshe Kelsang Gyatso, a Tibetan Buddhist teacher, monk and scholar from the Gelug tradition, is a contemporary of Lama Yeshe's from the time they spent studying at Sera Monastery.

Geshe Kelsang was requested by Lama Yeshe to lead the "General Program" of Buddhist study. In 1979 Lama Yeshe installed another Geshe at Manjushri Institute, Geshe Jampa Tekchok, to teach a parallel twelve-year Geshe Studies Programme, which was recognized and validated by the Dalai Lama and which was modeled on the traditional Geshe degree. From 1982 to 1990 this program was led by Geshe Konchog Tsewang. According to a disciple of Lama Yeshe from this time, Lama Yeshe intended the institute "to become the central monastery of the FPMT ... one of the early jewels of the FPMT crown" and "the pioneer among the western centers".

== Separation from the FPMT ==
In the late 1970s, Geshe Kelsang received a request to give a teaching in York, at which he met Ron Lister. Ron later invited Geshe Kelsang to stay with him in York, since the winters in the drafty Conishead Priory were difficult for Geshe Kelsang's health. While in York, Geshe Kelsang was requested repeatedly to teach. Acting in accordance with his Bodhisattva vow not to withhold teachings from those who request them, he offered a number of teachings there. Eventually this led to a new Buddhist Centre, Madhyamaka Centre, being established in York under Geshe Kelsang's guidance. Kay sees this as the beginning of a conflict between Lama Yeshe and Geshe Kelsang. However, according to Geshe Kelsang, "the opening of the Centre in York caused not one moment of confusion or disharmony". Geshe Kelsang was asked to resign so that another Geshe, described by Kay as "more devoted to FPMT objectives", could take over as a resident teacher of Manjushri Institute. Many students of Geshe Kelsang petitioned him to stay and teach them, and on this basis he decided to remain. As Geshe Kelsang said in Santa Barbara USA, 2 February 1996:

"Soon after I arrived I started to teach Guide to the Bodhisattva's Way of Life, which took almost one year. Then I gave extensive Lamrim teachings, and after that I taught Guide to the Middle Way. So altogether it took almost three years to complete my commitment and I was very happy to return to India. My root Guru Trijang Rinpoche was there and he was very old; my mother and my many spiritual friends were there. Lama Yeshe also accepted my returning to India, so I nearly returned to India. But then the Manjushri Institute community people strongly requested me to stay."

In the following years prior to 1990 Geshe Kelsang established 15 centres under his own direction in Great Britain and Spain.

The management committee of Manjushri Institute, also known as "the Priory Group", were deeply appreciative of Geshe Kelsang's teachings and example and were some of his closest students. According to Kay, "The Priory Group became dissatisfied with the FPMT's increasingly centralized organisation" and some of the FPMT's policies "were considered to be particularly unreasonable strains which threatened the Institute's existence." Moreover, some of Lama Yeshe's students were alleged to be engaging in illegal activities, which would cause embarrassment to Lama Yeshe and to the FPMT. Cozort states that different disagreements "led to a rift between Lama Yeshe and his students and Geshe Kelsang Gyatso and his, and eventually the Manjushri Board of directors (composed of Geshe Kelsang's students) severed the connection between the institute and the FPMT." According to Kay, Lama Yeshe tried at different times to reassert his authority over the institute, but his attempts were unsuccessful. Kay goes on to describe an open conflict of authority which developed between the Priory Group and the FPMT administration in 1983. In February 1984 the conflict was mediated by the Office of the Dalai Lama in London. Kay states that after the death of Lama Yeshe in March 1984, the FPMT lost interest because they saw it as a fruitless case. Since that time, Kay states, the Manjushri Institute has developed mainly under the guidance of Geshe Kelsang without further reference to the FPMT, but legally remained part of the FPMT until late 1990.

A detailed history of early Manjushri Institute and its relationship to the FPMT and the NKT is given by three reliable witnesses who were involved in the proceedings. They explain:

The community of Manjushri Institute wished to save their building, Conishead Priory, from being sold to make funds available for suspect business dealings in Hong Kong.(This needs to be clarified, as it is just an allegation). This meant they needed to separate from the FPMT. On the other hand, they wished Lama Yeshe to stay as their Spiritual Director. After continual discussions on how to solve the problem, also involving two representatives from the Dalai Lama, the Institute’s managers – then called the ‘Priory Group’ – decided to take steps to separate Manjushri Institute from FPMT.

There were three main reasons for doing this:

1) FPMT managers had committed serious illegal actions, which was public knowledge among many people at Dharma centres;(this needs to be clarified, as it is just an allegation as it stands)

2) FPMT managers wanted to sell Manjushri Institute’s building; and

3) Although, according to its constitution, legally everything at the centre belonged only to four people, in reality all the work of developing the centre was being done by the community, and not these four.

Eventually, a legally binding agreement was made, which was signed by the FPMT’s representatives, Geshe Kelsang, the Priory Group and the community representatives. One part of the agreement was to confirm that Lama Yeshe was the Spiritual Director of Manjushri Centre.

== Establishment of the NKT-IKBU ==
Geshe Kelsang made a 3-year retreat from 1987 to 1990 in Dumfries, Scotland and asked Geshe Losang Pende from Ganden Shartse monastery to lead the General Programme in his absence, whilst Geshe Konchog Tsewang continued to teach the Geshe Studies Programme at Conishead Priory (Manjushri Institute). Different Lamas, including Lama Zopa Rinpoche, were still invited. Especially the visit of Lama Zopa Rinpoche in 1988 "is significant, indicating the ongoing devotion of the students to this lama and their desire to leave the negativity of the schism with the FPMT in the past." In 1988 and 1990 the uncle of Geshe Kelsang, Ven. Choyang Duldzin Kuten Lama - the oracle of Dorje Shugden - also visited Manjushri Institute. Before that time Song Rinpoche, Geshe Lhundup Sopa, Geshe Rabten, as well as other lamas such as Ajahn Sumedho and Thich Nhat Hanh have taught at Manjushri Institute.

During Geshe Kelsang's period of retreat he wrote five books and established the foundations of the New Kadampa Tradition. Kay states: "The first major development that took place during Geshe Kelsang's retreat was the introduction of the 'Teacher Training Programme' (TTP) at the Manjushri Institute."

In 1990 the Geshe Studies Programme at Manjushri Institute was cancelled, as it had been in most of the other FPMT Centres where it had been established. According to Cozort, "No one, to my knowledge, ever completed the FPMT Geshe Studies Programme. The program never ran its full course in any of the Centres where it was taught."

In 1991, Manjushri Institute was dissolved and its assets turned over to a new corporation, Manjushri Mahayana Buddhist Centre, located on the same premises at Conishead Priory. The centre was later renamed Manjushri Kadampa Meditation Centre, which is still active as the "Mother Centre" of the NKT-IKBU.
