= The New Heart of Wisdom =

Book by Kelsang Gyatso

The New Heart of Wisdom: Profound Teachings from Buddha's Heart
- Author: Geshe Kelsang Gyatso
- Language: English
- Genre: Religion, Buddhism, Spirituality
- Publisher: Tharpa Publications
- Publication date: 5th. ed., 2012
- Publication place: United Kingdom
- Media type: Print
- ISBN: 978-0-948006-77-7
- OCLC: 48195039

The New Heart of Wisdom: Profound Teachings from Buddha's Heart (Tharpa Publications 5th. ed., 2012 ISBN 978-1906665043) is a commentary to Buddha Shakyamuni's Heart Sutra by Geshe Kelsang Gyatso.

The Heart Sutra is a well-known Mahāyāna Buddhist Sutra that is very popular among Mahayana Buddhists both for its brevity and depth of meaning. The New Heart of Wisdom contains a translation of the Sutra as well as a word by word commentary.

An understanding of emptiness (Śūnyatā), the ultimate nature of reality, lies at the heart of Buddhist view and practice. The Heart Sutra contains the essence of Buddha's teachings on emptiness and the methods to develop the wisdom that understands this ultimate reality. The New Heart of Wisdom reveals its explicit and implicit meanings and relates them to the five Mahayana paths that lead to full enlightenment. The author also explains how an initial understanding of emptiness can be used in conjunction with the Sutra to overcome both internal and external obstacles to happiness.

Emptiness is not easy to understand but as the author explains:

Through studying, contemplating and meditating on this Sutra we can gain a perfect understanding of the nature of reality; we can overcome hindrances and difficulties in our daily life; and finally we can overcome the obstacles preventing our full awakening, thereby attaining the perfect state of Buddhahood.

David Vennells supports this observation:

Correct instructions and explanations of emptiness are essential; they help us to develop our wisdom gradually and joyfully. Emptiness cannot be understood overnight, it might take us a few years before we begin to get a feel for it, but if we have good instruction and the support of qualified teachers we can experience wonderful results that really transform our life for the better. See Heart of Wisdom by Geshe Kelsang Gyatso.

The teachings on emptiness such as those explained in Heart of Wisdom also provide an essential basis for the study and practice of Buddhist Tantra, such as generating ourself as the Buddhist female Deity Vajrayogini. An understanding of the interdependence of all phenomena as explained in the book also provides the deepest foundation for developing compassion and empathy according to Buddhism.

The New Heart of Wisdom explains the philosophical implications of emptiness in practical, everyday terms for both the scholar and the lay reader. In his book Reiki Mastery, David Vennells says:

People and places and all our experiences appear real but in reality they are simply mental projections from within our own mind, just like a dream. This is a huge concept with many implications and opportunities for misunderstanding! Correctly understanding and experiencing this truty is the essence of the Buddhist path to enlightenment. The best way to really develop clear wisdom of what is being suggested here is to read books that deal specifically with this topic, like Heart of Wisdom by Geshe Kelsang Gyatso.

To realize emptiness, or the nature of reality, it is necessary to realize the lack of inherent existence of persons and phenomena, which is explained in detail in Heart of Wisdom. Author Victor Mansfield explains:

Tibetan scholar-monks such as Tenzin Gyatso or Geshe Kelsang Gyatso who teach extensively in the West ... use inherent existence (svabhavasiddhi) interchangeably with such terms as independent existence, intrinsic existence, substantial existence, intrinsic essence, or intrinsic self-nature to mean our most innate, unreflective and pragmatic belief about both subjective and objective phenomena.

Buddha's teachings on emptiness has been mentioned in relationship to quantum physics, although there are important differences that are brought up by Victor Mansfield when comparing Geshe Kelsang's traditional Buddhist approach in The New Heart of Wisdom to Albert Einstein's.

Einstein believed that objects exist independently in two ways. First, they are independent of our knowing or perception... Second, objects are independent of each other... The Tibetan Buddhist monk-scholar, Geshe Kelsang Gyatso, echoes these same two forms of independence when he says, "If we are ordinary beings, all objects appear to us to exist inherently. Objects seem to be independent of our mind and independent of other phenomena." Although Einstein speaks for Western classical science and Geshe Gyatso speaks for an ancient Buddhist tradition, at a fundamental level they are addressing the same point. (Though of course they are arguing for opposite positions.)

The New Heart of Wisdom is used as an integral part of the New Kadampa Tradition's Foundation Program with tens of thousands of students worldwide, described by Steven Heine in Buddhism in the Modern World: Adaptations of an Ancient Tradition:

The Foundation Program is meant for serious students who want a guided study at a deeper level than they can get through the series of Lamrim talks, usually all pitched to a beginner's capacity, that normally constitute the fare of Western Dharma centers.

It is also an integral part of the New Kadampa Tradition's Teacher Training Program, a rigorous "multilayered educational" study program of Buddha's teachings of Sutra and Tantra presented in accordance with the tradition of the Tibetan master Je Tsongkhapa (AD 1357–1419), designed for those training as Buddhist teachers.
