= Universal Compassion =

Book by Kelsang Gyatso

Universal Compassion: Inspiring Solutions for Difficult Times
- Author: Geshe Kelsang Gyatso
- Language: English
- Genre: Religion, Buddhism, Spirituality
- Publisher: Tharpa Publications
- Publication date: 4th. ed., 2002
- Publication place: United Kingdom
- Media type: Print
- ISBN: 978-0-948006-72-2
- OCLC: 51047789

Universal Compassion: Inspiring Solutions for Difficult Times, Tharpa Publications (4th. ed., 2002) ISBN 978-0-948006-72-2 is a commentary to Geshe Chekhawa's Training the Mind in Seven Points by Geshe Kelsang Gyatso, a Buddhist teacher and author in the West.

Training the Mind in Seven Points is an explanation of Buddha's instructions on training the mind or Lojong in Tibetan, which explain how to transform adverse conditions into the path to enlightenment, principally, by developing one's own compassion and wisdom. Geshe Chekhawa or Chekawa Yeshe Dorje (1102–1176 AD) was a famous Kadampa Buddhist meditation master. Universal Compassion is a word by word commentary to Training the Mind in Seven Points, described as "an admirable accomplishment in presenting the profound teachings of present-day Mahayana Buddhism" and "An inspiring book for all who aspire to practise the Buddhist path". The commentary also contains a clear translation of the root text.

Buddha's teachings emphasize unconditional love and compassion, and in this commentary to the popular Buddhist poem Training the Mind in Seven Points, the author explains powerful Buddhist methods for developing these altruistic states. The practice of Lojong also explains how one can transform day-to-day living – including even demanding and difficult conditions – into opportunities for spiritual development.

The Lojong teachings in Universal Compassion have been used by caregivers, healers and hospice workers in the UK and US both to help them cope and to find effective techniques to manage the suffering of the ill and the dying. For example, hospice psychologist Kathleen Dowling Singh (author of Grace in Dying) explains:

The Lojong teachings... are particularly applicable for those caregivers who see the ultimate unworkability of viewing the needs of self and other in opposition and who seek to find a way to give care and benefit to both self and other simultaneously. These Dharma teachings bridge the gap from ordinary mind to enlightened mind, illuminating the process whereby, with effort, we are able to exchange the object of our cherishing from self to other."

Taking and giving is a profound practice that takes some getting used to. The author says: "At first we may find it difficult to take on others' sufferings... but this will become easier as our compassion increases." (page 37) Joan Borysenko PhD, who calls Universal Compassion "a marvelous book on the practice of tonglen", supports this observation:

People sometimes fear that tonglen (taking and giving) will harm them when they imagine breathing in pain, ignorance or illness. The Tibetan lamas say that the only thing we can harm with tonglen is our ego and its self-grasping, which will dissolve in the intention of compassion.

In fact the object of meditation for taking and giving is great joy: "We develop the conviction that we have destroyed our self-cherishing mind and purified our negative karma, and then generate joy. We meditate on this feeling of joy for as long as possible."

The teachings in Universal Compassion give a step-by-step explanation of developing the minds of love, compassion and wisdom and in this way progressing along the spiritual path to enlightenment. Kathleen Dowling Singh explains:

Step by step, the Lojong practices, when practiced with sincere effort, strong faith, and deep intention, move us through the stages of the Mahayana path. We develop "equalizing self and others", the capacity and willingness to cherish all living beings to the same degree that we cherish ourself. We work to develop the capacity for wishing love, that is to say, the wish that all living beings be happy. The Lojong practices then offer skillful means to develop our compassion, the wish that all living beings without exception be free from suffering and its causes. We make the precious practice of taking and giving second nature. This practice enhances and completes our exchanging the object of our cherishing from self to other. From this attainment, we can develop the mind of enlightenment, bodhichitta.

Universal Compassion is part of the Kadam tradition of Mahayana Buddhism. Training the Mind And Cultivating Loving Kindness by Chogyam Trungpa explains that the Kadam lineage, founded by Atisha, places great emphasis on monastic discipline, the cultivation or bodhichitta and compassion, and mind training. This emphasis was carried into the Kagyu lineage by Gampopa. The origin and history of the Lojong teachings, which come from the Kadam lineage, are explained in Universal Compassion.

These practices are not restricted only to Buddhists, and Universal Compassion "could be read with profit by anyone whose religion demands the exercise of compassion." These teachings explain how all living beings are equally important and help create a world that does not discriminate based on people's background, faith, sexual orientation and so on.

Universal Compassion is used as an integral part of the New Kadampa Tradition's Foundation Program with tens of thousands of students worldwide, described by Steven Heine in Buddhism in the Modern World: Adaptations of an Ancient Tradition:

The Foundation Program is meant for serious students who want a guided study at a deeper level than they can get through the series of Lamrim talks, usually all pitched to a beginner's capacity, that normally constitute the fare of Western Dharma centers.

It is also an integral part of the New Kadampa Tradition's Teacher Training Program, a rigorous "multilayered educational" study program of Buddha's teachings of Sutra and Tantra presented in accordance with the tradition of the Tibetan master Je Tsongkhapa (AD 1357–1419), designed for those training as Buddhist teachers.
