= Life-Extending Ten-Line Kannon Sutra =

Mahayana Buddhist sutra

The Life-Extending Ten-Line Kannon Sutra (延命十句観音経, Enmei Jukku Kannon Gyō) is a short Mahayana Buddhist sutra, comprised of only 42 Chinese characters. It is recorded in the Southern Song Dynasty Records of the Buddhas and Patriarchs and seems to appear as a short recitation text during Hakuin's lifetime (1686–1769). The Zen master urges an unnamed donor to chant the sutra one thousand times a day to be restored "completely and joyously" to health. Hakuin notes that the sutra is not found among those preached by the historical Buddha, but was revealed directly by Kannon to a Chinese government official facing execution. Since the longer Kannon Sutra (Chapter 25 of the Lotus Sutra) was prohibitively lengthy, the prisoner was given the ten-line sutra instead, which caused the executioner's blades to break into three pieces miraculously. Yamada Koun considered the sutra a kind of dharani, as recounted by Robert Baker Aitken.

== Text ==
| Sino-Japanese with furigana | Transliteration | Translation (Note: Public domain translation) |
|---|---|---|
| 觀世音(かんぜおん) | KAN ZE ON | Avalokiteshvara |
| 南無佛(なむぶつ) | NA MU BUTSU | Namu butsu (Note: Transliterated in the original.) |
| 與佛有因(よぶつういん) | YO BUTSU U IN | With Buddha as cause |
| 與佛有緣(よぶつうえん) | YO BUTSU U EN | With Buddha as condition |
| 佛法相緣(ぶっぽうそうえん) | BUP PO SO EN | Three Jewels as condition |
| 常樂我淨(じょうらくがじょう) | JO RAKU GA JO | Permanent, joyous, self-existent, and pure |
| 朝念觀世音(ちょうねんかんぜおん) | CHO NEN KANZON | Morning: remember (nen) Kanzeon |
| 暮念觀世音(ぼねんかんぜおん) | BO NEN KANZEON | Evening: remember (nen) Kanzeon |
| 念念從心起(ねんねんじゅうしんき) | NEN NEN JU SHIN KI | Each thought from the heart [heart-mind; 心 shin] arises |
| 念念不離心(ねんねんふりしん) | NEN NEN FU RI SHIN | Each thought is not separate from the heart |

== See also ==
- Heart Sutra (Prajñāpāramitāhṛdaya), another short Mahayana sutra
- Dharani, lengthier mantras
- Other repeatedly-chanted texts in Japanese Buddhism:
  - Nembutsu
  - Daimoku
  - Mantra of light

== Works cited ==
- Waddell, N. (2012). Beating the Cloth Drum: Letters of Zen Master Hakuin. Shambhala. ISBN 978-1-59030-948-3.
- Tanahashi, Kazuaki (2016-03-01). The Heart Sutra. Shambhala Publications. ISBN 978-1-61180-312-9.
- Ekaku, Hakuin (2010-07-13). Wild Ivy. Translated by N. Waddell. Boston, Mass: Shambhala Publications. ISBN 978-1-59030-809-7.
- Aitken, Robert (1997-06-01). Original Dwelling Place. Washington, D.C: Catapult. ISBN 978-1-887178-41-9.
