= The New Meditation Handbook =

Book by Kelsang Gyatso

The New Meditation Handbook: Meditations to Make Our Life Happy and Meaningful
- Author: Geshe Kelsang Gyatso
- Language: English
- Genre: Religion, Buddhism, Spirituality
- Publisher: Tharpa Publications
- Publication date: 2003
- Publication place: United Kingdom
- Media type: Print
- ISBN: 978-0-9817277-1-4
- OCLC: 262886013

The New Meditation Handbook: Meditations to Make Our Life Happy and Meaningful (Tharpa Publications (2003) ISBN 978-0-9817277-1-4) is a guide to Buddhist philosophy and meditation techniques. It is a compilation of twenty-one concise meditations on Lamrim, or the stages of the path to enlightenment, by Geshe Kelsang Gyatso, a Buddhist teacher and author in the West.

The New Meditation Handbook contains twenty-one meditations on Lamrim that are designed to be followed in a cycle, thus covering all of Buddha's teachings every 21 days. The meditations are described as "actual methods to control our mind. Because everyone has different wishes and capacities, many different levels of meditation practice are given."

Geshe Kelsang Gyatso, a Tibetan monk, entered the monastery at the age of eight and has spent the past 30 years establishing Buddhist centers throughout the world. He provides 21 contemplative meditations to systematically guide a seeker to enlightenment according to Buddhist philosophy.

The 21 meditations are intended to give a concise overview of essential Buddhist teachings and philosophy with the purpose of increasing peace of mind, positivity, and spiritual wisdom. Foreword Magazine says: "Geshe Kelsang Gyatso's words provide a stimulatingly peaceful perspective.", Kirkus Reviews called it "Clear, inspirational writing" and Booklist says "The New Meditation Handbook is a simple, sincere guide to Buddhist philosophy and meditation techniques. According to Spirituality and Health Magazine: "This manual provides a succinct and inspiring overview of the many ways in which Buddhism can be applied to the situations and activities of daily life."

The book focuses on Buddha's teaching that all human beings have potential for spiritual growth by overcoming negative minds and increasing positive ones in daily life. Donna Seaman of Booklist suggests: "Geshe Kelsang has a unique gift for simultaneously addressing everyday difficulties--particularly in his useful and inspiring elucidation of how to control anger and practice patience--and bringing into focus the spiritual dimension in which they reverberate."

The author is the founder of the New Kadampa Tradition, which has 1100 Buddhist centers and groups worldwide.
