= Kelsang Gyatso =

Tibetan writer and former religious leader (1931–2022)

Geshe Kelsang Gyatso
- Born: Lobsang Chuponpa; 4 June 1931; Yangcho Tang, Western Tibet
- Died: 17 September 2022 (aged 91)
- Occupations: Buddhist monk, meditation teacher, scholar, and author

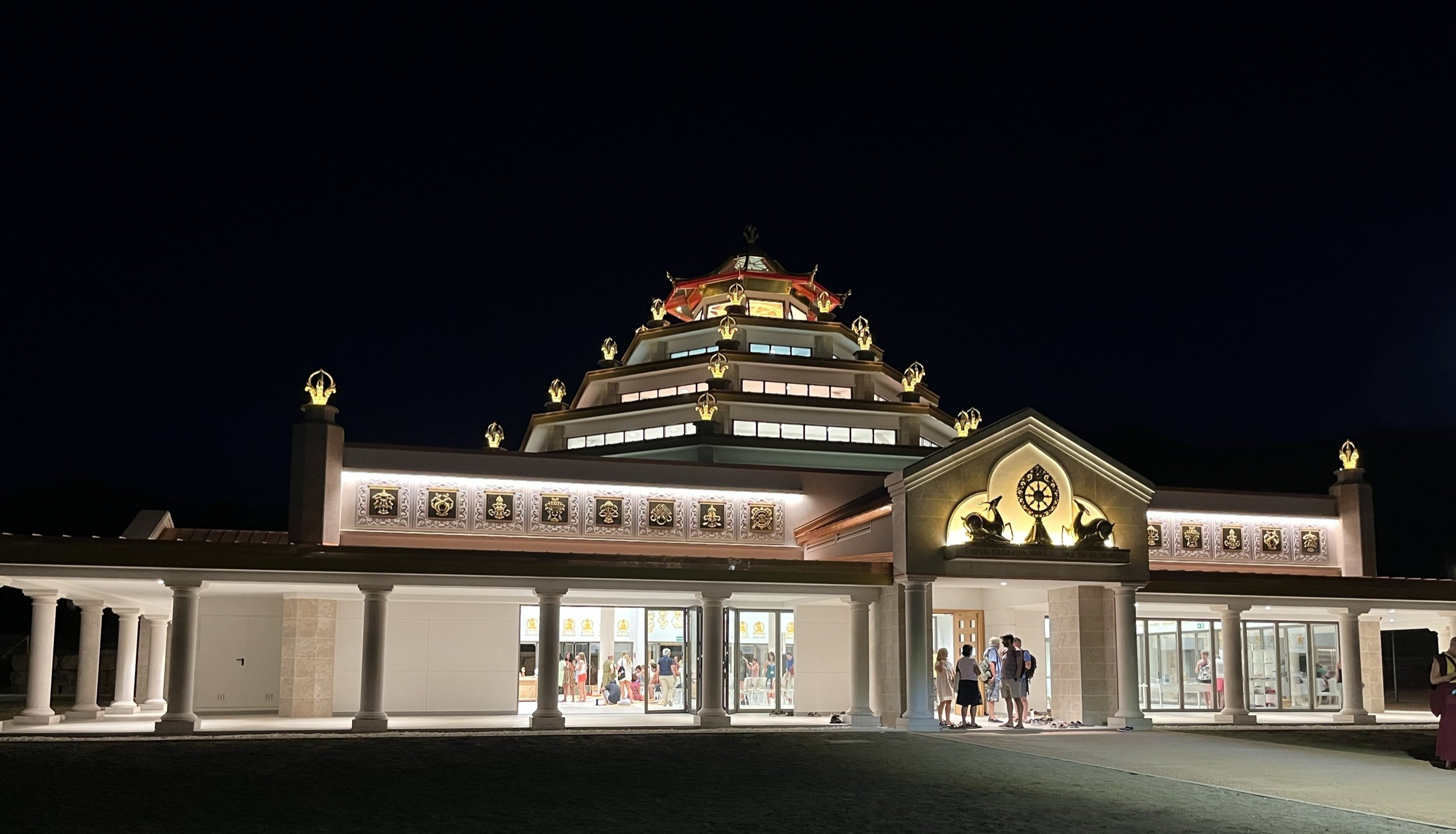
6th Kadampa Temple, based on the design of Geshe Kelsang Gyatso and dedicated to World Peace. Inaugurated June 2022

Geshe Kelsang Gyatso (Tibetan: བསྐལ་བཟང་རྒྱ་མཚོ།, Wylie: bskal bzang rgya mtsho; 4 June 1931 – 17 September 2022) was a Buddhist monk, meditation teacher, scholar, and author. He was the founder and spiritual director of the New Kadampa Tradition, a registered non-profit, modern Buddhist organization and new religious movement that emerged from the Gelugpa school. It currently lists more than 1,300 affiliated centres in over 25 countries.

== Early life ==
Geshe Kelsang Gyatso was born on 19 July 1931, in Yangcho Tang, Western Tibet and named Lobsang Chuponpa. At eight years old, he joined Ngamring Jampa Ling Monastery where he was ordained as a novice monk and given the monastic name "Kelsang Gyatso" meaning "Ocean of Good Fortune". He "went on to study at Sera, one of the great monasteries of Tibet’s dominant Gelug school. He was trained in the traditional method of intense scholastic study and debate, and he studied for a geshe degree, an advanced distinction in Buddhist scholarship."

After escaping to India via Nepal during the 1959 Tibetan exodus, Kelsang Gyatso stayed at the monastic study centre established at Buxa Fort in West Bengal, India. All he brought with him were two Buddhist scriptures — Shantideva's Guide to the Bodhisattva's Way of Life and a text by Je Tsongkhapa. In 1971, the Indian Government donated large tracts of land in South India to the community in exile, where separate monasteries were established.

At this time, Kelsang Gyatso left the monastery at Buxa for Mussoorie (a hill station in the Indian state of Uttarakhand) where he taught and engaged in intensive meditation retreat for 16 years. At that time Kelsang Gyatso was, as David Kay puts it, "by all accounts, a very well respected scholar and meditator" within the Tibetan exile community. He spent much of his time in India in retreat: "over the next two decades he spent long periods in retreat in the Himalayan foothills."

== New Kadampa Tradition ==
In 1976, Lama Thubten Yeshe, Thubten Zopa Rinpoche and Peter Kedge of the Yeshe Foundation visited India to invite Kelsang Gyatso, a former classmate of Lama Zopa's, to teach the programme at Manjushri Institute on a three-year contract. In November 1977, Geshe Kelsang arrived at the Manjushri Institute, on a supported visa, as its first resident teacher.

In 1978, the Yeshe Foundation changed its name to the Foundation for the Preservation of the Mahayana Tradition or FPMT. That year, Kelsang Gyatso also established the Madhyamaka Centre in York under his own spiritual direction. While the FPMT aimed to embrace all lineages of Tibetan Buddhism, Kelsang Gyatso believed in a more exclusivist teaching, creating conflict between the FPMT's leadership and Geshe Gyatso, which was deepened by the creation of a new centre distinct from the FPMT.

In November 1986, Kelsang Gyatso oversaw the rebuilding of Ngamring Jampa Ling Monastery after its destruction, and it was fully restored and reopened by September 1988. In 1987, Kelsang Gyatso entered a 3-year retreat at Tharpaland International Retreat Centre in Dumfries, Scotland. During his retreat, he wrote five books and established the foundations of what would become the New Kadampa Tradition (NKT).

In April 1991, Geshe Kelsang announced the formation of the NKT as an independent organisation, and invited the centres he had established to join. In 1992, a new charitable company, Manjushri Mahayana Buddhist Centre, was incorporated, separate from the FPMT. It later became the Manjushri Kadampa Meditation Centre, which is the flagship center of the NKT.

== Teachings ==
Kelsang Gyatso taught the General Programme at Manjushri from 1977 until 1987. Under Kelsang Gyatso's spiritual direction, Manjushri Institute became an active training and retreat center. During this time, on October 13, 1983, Kelsang Gyatso became a naturalized British citizen.

Kelsang Gyatso's teachings have an emphasis on the Lamrim, Lojong and Mahamudra. The NKT-IKBU has three study programs: the General Programme, the Foundation Programme, and the Teacher Training Programme. It aims to provide Buddhist teachings that are accessible to Western practitioners. Qualification as an NKT-IKBU dharma teacher is generally achieved by attending the NKT-IKBU's Teacher Training Programme, which Kelsang Gyatso regarded as "a western equivalent to the traditional Tibetan Geshe degree", although much compressed.

Kelsang Gyatso established the NKT-IKBU Dharma Centres as mixed communities of lay and ordained practitioners, all on the same teaching programmes. He also promoted the development of local teachers in their own language.

=== Exclusivism ===
Scholars of Buddhism such as Robert Bluck, Daniel Cozort, David Kay, and Helen Waterhouse have described Gyatso's formation of the New Kadampa Tradition as unusual among Tibetan Buddhist groups, since it intentionally distinguishes itself from the traditions that preceded it and its contemporaries. It does this while also emphasising the purity of its Tibetan lineage.

Kelsang Gyatso said his aim was to establish an independent movement which directly followed the "pure" teachings of Je Tsongkhapa and which focussed exclusively on the translations and commentaries of Geshe Kelsang himself. Waterhouse has described this view as sectarian.

Kay says that NKT-IKBU practitioners practice their tradition exclusively, "eschewing eclecticism," and that the NKT defines itself in this way to show that it is adapted for the needs of Westerners, but also to emphasise that it alone is guardian of "the pure tradition of Tsongkhapa in the modern world". According to Bluck, Kelsang Gyatso's "conservative and traditional presentation of Buddhism" may be appealing to Westerners who "wish for a meaningful alternative to spiritual pluralism".

According to Kelsang Gyatso in Understanding the Mind, "If we try to create a synthesis of different traditions we shall destroy the special power of each and be left only with a mishmash of our own making that will be a source of confusion and doubt." In Great Treasury of Merit, he said that the most effective way to progress spiritually is by "following one tradition purely — relying upon one Teacher, practicing only his teachings, and following his Dharma Protector."

Tibetologist Robert Barnett says the NKT is unusual in its criticism and rejection of mainstream Tibetan Buddhism. Kelsang Gyatso himself severed ties with the Gelug teachers in India and Tibet, establishing himself as the organisation's sole religious authority. In 1996, Kelsang Gyatso was formally expelled by the Sera Je Monastery for his worship of Dorje Shugden and criticism of the Dalai Lama, and had his geshe degree revoked.

== Dorje Shugden activism ==
Kelsang Gyatso and the New Kadampa Tradition have been criticised for their involvement with the International Shugden Community and, as a consequence, what David Kay calls its "leading role in a Western-based campaign mounted against the Dalai Lama" during his visit to the United Kingdom in 1996.

Geshe Kelsang is often credited with popularising Dorje Shugden worship to the West. He and the NKT objected to the Dalai Lama's advice that Buddhists should not worship Dorje Shugden, a Gelug Dharmapala (protector deity) associated with sectarianism. The Western Shugden Society, which received backing from the Chinese government to criticise the Dalai Lama, describes Kelsang Gyatso as the final teacher in the Dorje Shugden spiritual lineage.

According to the NKT, Dorje Shugden worship is "the very essence of the New Kadampa Tradition", and the protector is presented as the deity most able to help practitioners. The NTK's The Heart Jewel and Wishfulfilling Jewel sādhanās, as compiled by Kelsang Gyatso, incorporate elements of the Dorje Shugden sādhanā. Dorje Shugden may also have influenced Geshe Kelsang's teaching that practitioners cannot mix with other traditions, a view which has been criticised by scholars and other Buddhists as sectarian.

In 1996, Gyatso was accused of defamation of the Dalai Lama in relation to the protests. This led to his expulsion from Sera Je Monastic University in India, and the revocation of his geshe (Buddhist teaching) degree.

== Retirement and death ==
In August 2009, he voluntarily stepped down as General Spiritual Director of the NKT-IKBU.. After this, Kelsang engaged in meditation retreat and continued to write books. Richard Spanswick said one of Kelsang's aims was to "produce a complete set of instructions for westerners wishing to set out on the path to enlightenment".

Kelsang Gyatso did not make any public appearances between October 2013 and his death in September 2022. The NKT stated he was "in strict retreat". On 19 September 2022, the NKT announced that Kelsang Gyatso had died two days earlier.

== Published works ==
- The Bodhisattva Vow: A Practical Guide to Helping Others, Tharpa Publications (2nd. ed., 1995) ISBN 978-0-948006-50-0
- Buddhism in the Tibetan Tradition: A Guide, Routledge & Kegan Paul (1984) ISBN 0-7102-0242-3, (Library Edition 2008) ISBN 978-0-415-46099-6
- Clear Light of Bliss: Tantric Meditation Manual, Tharpa Publications (2nd. ed., 1992) ISBN 978-0-948006-21-0
- Eight Steps to Happiness: The Buddhist Way of Loving Kindness, Tharpa Publications (2000) ISBN 978-0-9817277-8-3
- Essence of Vajrayana: The Highest Yoga Tantra Practice of Heruka Body Mandala, Tharpa Publications (1997) ISBN 978-0-948006-48-7
- Great Treasury of Merit: How to Rely Upon a Spiritual Guide, Tharpa Publications (1992) ISBN 978-0-948006-22-7
- Guide to Dakini Land: The Highest Yoga Tantra Practice of Buddha Vajrayogini, Tharpa Publications (2nd. ed., 1996) ISBN 978-0-948006-39-5
- Guide to the Bodhisattva's Way of Life: How to Enjoy a Life of Great Meaning and Altruism, a translation of Shantideva's Bodhisattvacharyavatara with Neil Elliott, Tharpa Publications (2002) ISBN 978-0-948006-88-3
- Heart Jewel: The Essential Practices of Kadampa Buddhism, Tharpa Publications (2nd. ed., 1997) ISBN 978-0-948006-56-2
- The New Heart of Wisdom: Profound Teachings from Buddha's Heart, Tharpa Publications (5th. ed., 2012) ISBN 978-1906665043
- How to Solve Our Human Problems: The Four Noble Truths, Tharpa Publications (2005, US ed., 2007) ISBN 978-0-9789067-1-9
- Introduction to Buddhism: An Explanation of the Buddhist Way of Life, Tharpa Publications (2nd. ed., 2001, US ed. 2008) ISBN 978-0-9789067-7-1
- Joyful Path of Good Fortune: The Complete Buddhist Path to Enlightenment, Tharpa Publications (2nd. ed., 1995) ISBN 978-0-948006-46-3
- Living Meaningfully, Dying Joyfully: The Profound Practice of Transference of Consciousness, Tharpa Publications (1999) ISBN 978-0-948006-63-0
- Mahamudra Tantra: The Supreme Heart Jewel Nectar, Tharpa Publications (2005) ISBN 978-0-948006-93-7
- Meaningful to Behold: The Bodhisattva's Way of Life, Tharpa Publications (5th. ed., 2008) ISBN 978-1-906665-11-1
- The Mirror of Dharma: How to Find the Real Meaning of Human Life, Tharpa Publications (2018)
- Modern Buddhism: The Path of Wisdom and Compassion, Tharpa Publications (2010) ISBN 978-1-906665-08-1
- The New Meditation Handbook: Meditations to Make Our Life Happy and Meaningful, Tharpa Publications (2003) ISBN 978-0-9817277-1-4
- Ocean of Nectar: The True Nature of All Things, Tharpa Publications (1995) ISBN 978-0-948006-23-4
- The Oral Instructions of the Mahamudra, Tharpa Publications (2015) ISBN 978-1910368237
- Tantric Grounds and Paths: How to Enter, Progress on, and Complete the Vajrayana Path, Tharpa Publications (1994) ISBN 978-0-948006-33-3
- Transform Your Life: A Blissful Journey, Tharpa Publications (2001, US ed. 2007) ISBN 978-0-9789067-4-0
- Understanding the Mind: The Nature and Power of the Mind, Tharpa Publications (2nd. ed., 1997) ISBN 978-0-948006-78-4
- Universal Compassion: Inspiring Solutions for Difficult Times, Tharpa Publications (4th. ed., 2002) ISBN 978-0-948006-72-2

== Sources ==
- Barnett, Robert (12 December 2014). "Protests against the Dalai Lama over Dorje Shugden – An interview with Robert Barnett". info-buddhism.com.
- Bluck, Robert (2006). British Buddhism: Teachings, practice and development (PDF). Routledge critical studies in Buddhism. London: Routledge Curzon. ISBN 1134158173. Archived from the original on 8 August 2014.
- "Dorje Shugden (Dolgyal): Untangling a Complex Issue". info-buddhism.com.
- Fish, Isaac Stone (2025-10-02). "Meet the Buddhists Who Hate the Dalai Lama More Than the Chinese Do". Foreign Policy.
- "Sera Je Monastery: Declaration of Expulsion". Shambhala Pubs. Translated by Gendun Gyatso and David Patt. 2017-03-06.
- Loader, Gwyn (28 September 2023). "Religion: Anglesey dad fears Buddhist group brainwashed son". BBC News.
- * Obadia, Lionel (2020). "When New Is Not-So-New: On the Meaning of "Modern" in a New Tibetan Movement: The New Kadampa Tradition". In Kim, David W. (ed.). New Religious Movements in Modern Asian History: Socio-Cultural Alternatives. Ethnographies of Religion. Lanham, Maryland: Rowman & Littlefield. pp. 91–112. ISBN 978-1-7936-3403-0. OCLC 1220880253.
- Powers, John (1996). "Review: Wisdom and Compassion in Mahāyāna Buddhism" (PDF). Journal of Buddhist Ethics. 3. ISSN 1076-9005.
- Waterhouse, Helen (1997). Authority and adaptation: a case study in British Buddhism (PDF) (Ph.D.). Bath Spa University.
- Waterhouse, Helen (2001). "Representing western Buddhism: a United Kingdom focus". In Beckerlegge, Gwilym (ed.). From Sacred Text to Internet. Religion today: tradition, modernity and change series. Ashgate. pp. 117–160. ISBN 0-7546-0816-6.
