= Geshe Rabten =

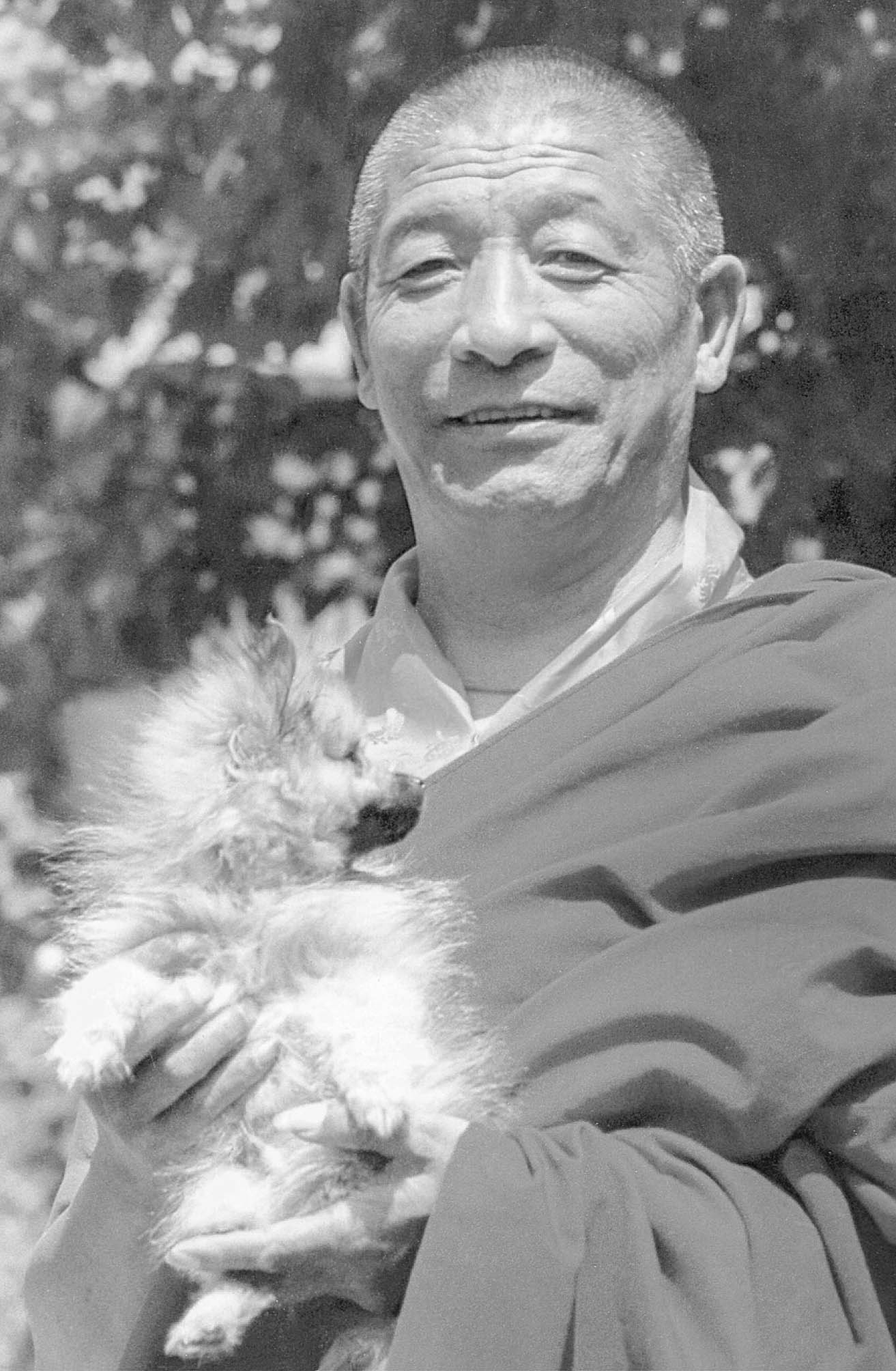
Geše Rinpoče.jpg

Geshe Rabten (1921–1986) was a Tibetan geshe born in Tibet.

He was a student at Sera Monastery in Lhasa, and achieved Geshe status before leaving Tibet in 1959. He became known as a debater, scholar, and meditation master.

Lama Yeshe and Lama Zopa Rinpoche were guided by him in their early days outside of Tibet.

In the mid 1960s Geshe Rabten was a religious assistant to the Dalai Lama.

The Dalai Lama asked him to teach Dharma to Westerners in Dharamshala in 1969.

He went to teach in Switzerland in 1974.

He was the founder of the Rabten Choeling Centre (which was originally named Tharpa Choeling) in Switzerland in 1979. He remained there until his death in 1986.

Other centres that he founded in Europe included the Tibetan centre in Hamburg, Tashi Rabten at the Letzehof, Puntsog Rabten in Munich and Gephel Ling in Milan.

== Works ==
- Rabten, Geshe (1974), The preliminary practices : [an oral teaching], Library of Tibetan Works & Archives
- Rabten, Geshe; Grabia, Brian (1988), Treasury of dharma : a Tibetan Buddhist meditation course, Tharpa, ISBN 978-0-948006-04-3
- Rabten, Geshe; Batchelor, Stephen (1983), Echoes of voidness, Wisdom, ISBN 978-0-86171-010-2
- Rabten Geshé (1989), Song of the profound view, Wisdom Publications, ISBN 978-0-86171-086-7
- Rabten, Geshe; Ngawang Dhargyey, 1925-; Beresford, Brian, 1948-; Gonsar Tulku; Sherpa Tulku (1984), Advice from a spiritual friend : Buddhist thought transformation (Rev. ed.), Wisdom, ISBN 978-0-86171-017-1
- Rabten, Geshe; Grabia, Brian; Rinpoche, Gonsar (1997), Treasury of dharma (New ed.), Edition Rabten, ISBN 978-3-905497-10-6
- Rabten, Geshe; Willson, Martin, 1946-; Ye-śes-brtson-ʾgrus. Lam rim bdud rtsi sñiṅ po. 1984 (1984), The essential nectar : meditations on the Buddhist path : an explanation of the Lam rim text of Yeshe Tsöndrü entitled The Essential nectar of the holy doctrine, and the text itself, Wisdom Publications, ISBN 978-0-86171-013-3
- Rabten, Geshe; Batchelor, Stephen (2008), The mind and its functions (2nd rev. ed.), Edition Rabten, ISBN 978-3-905497-46-5
