= Dharmapala of Nalanda =

Indian philosopher (530–561)

Dharmapāla

Personal life
- Born: c. 530 CE
- Died: c. 561 or 590 CE
- Education: Nalanda

Religious life
- Religion: Buddhism
- School: Mahayana

Senior posting
- Teacher: Dignāga
- Students: Śīlabhadra; Dharmakīrti

Dharmapāla (traditional Chinese: 護法, pinyin: Hùfǎ) (530–561 CE or 530–590 CE), was an Indian Buddhist scholar and one of the main teachers of the Yogācāra school of philosophy in India. Amongst his contemporaries were Sthiramati and Bhāviveka, the latter of whom he interacted with. Dharmapāla's philosophical thought is mainly preserved in Chinese translations and he is highly regarded within the school of East Asian Yogācāra.

== Life ==
In his Records of the Western Regions, Xuanzang writes that Dharmapāla was born in Kanchipuram, where he was the son of a high official and was betrothed to a daughter of the king. However just before his wedding was supposed to take place, he escaped and entered the order, studied all views, Hinayana as well as Mahayana, and attained to reverence and distinction. Some variations of this story assert that he escaped by praying to a deity who transported him to a monastery which was located far from his homeland. He studied in Nalanda as a student of Dignāga and Śīlabhadra later became his disciple. Later he succeeded him as abbot of the university. He spent his last years near the Bodhi tree, where he died. There are differing accounts as to how long Dharmapāla stayed at Nalanda. Kuiji, a disciple of Xuanzang, states in his writings that Dharmapāla left Nalanda at the age of twenty-nine to write treatises and practice meditation before dying at the age of thirty-two. However Taranatha states that Dharmapāla stayed at Nalanda for thirty years where he continued to study under Dignāga.

=== Bhāviveka's offer ===
According to Xuanzang, one of Dharmapāla's contemporaries and fellow Buddhist philosopher, Bhāviveka, had heard stories of Dharmapāla and decided to travel to Nalanda to debate him and test his knowledge. Bhāviveka's students were sent initially to propose the challenge however Dharmapāla rejected the offer and made the following statement:

"[t]he human world is like a mirage, and life in this body mere flotsam; I desperately thirst for each day of practice – I cannot spare time for polemical chit-chat!”

While the two never debated they did engage with each other's works in their own writings with Bhāviveka criticising the Yogācāra view on the Trisvabhāva (three natures) in his Madhyamakahṛdayakārikā while Dharmapāla attempted to refute this view in his Karatalaratna.

== Philosophy and works ==
Dharmapāla developed the theory that the external things do ultimately not exist on their own, and mental representations only exists. He explains the experience of the phenomenal world as arising from the Eight Consciousnesses.

Through the teachings of his disciple Śīlabhadra to Xuanzang, Dharmapāla's tenets spread widely in China.

According to Chinese sources, Dharmapāla wrote four works. One of these is a lost work on grammar. The other three, which only survive in Chinese, are the following commentaries:

- A Commentary on the Four-Hundred Verses (Dasheng guang bailun shilun 大乘廣百論 釋論; T1571, in 10 fascicles): a commentary on the Four-Hundred Verses (Catuḥśataka) of Āryadeva (c. third century).
- Jewel-Arising Treatise on the Establishment of Consciousness-Only (Cheng weishi baosheng lun 成唯識寶生論; T1591, in 5 fascicles), a commentary on Vasubandhu's Twenty Verses (Viṃśikā).
- A Commentary on the Investigation of Cognitive Objects (Guan suoyuan lun shi 觀所緣 論釋; T1625, in 1 fascicle;), commentary on Dignāga's Investigation of Cognitive Objects (Ālambanaparīkṣā).
