= Yogachara =

Tradition of Buddhist philosophy and psychology

Translations of Yogācāra school
- English: Yoga Practice, Doctrine of Consciousness, Consciousness-Only Doctrine, Cognizance-Only, Mind-Only
- Sanskrit: Yogācāra, Vijñānavāda, Vijñaptivāda, Vijñaptimātratā, Cittamātra
- Chinese: 唯識瑜伽行派 (Pinyin: Wéishí Yújiāxíng Pài)
- Japanese: 瑜伽行唯識派 (Rōmaji: Yugagyō Yuishiki Ha)
- Korean: 유식유가행파 (RR: Yusik-Yugahaeng-pa)
- Tibetan: རྣལ་འབྱོར་སྤྱོད་པ་ (rnal 'byor spyod pa)
- Vietnamese: Du-già Hành Tông

Yogachara (Sanskrit: Yogācāra) is an influential tradition of Buddhist philosophy and psychology emphasizing the study of cognition, perception, and consciousness through the interior lens of meditation, as well as philosophical reasoning (hetuvidyā). Yogachara was one of the two most influential traditions of Mahayana Buddhism in India, along with Madhyamaka.

The compound Yogācāra literally means "practice of yoga", or "one whose practice is yoga", hence the name of the school is literally "the school of the yogins". Yogācāra was also variously termed Vijñānavāda (the doctrine of consciousness), Vijñaptivāda (the doctrine of ideas or percepts) or Vijñaptimātratā-vāda (the doctrine of 'mere representation'), which is also the name given to its major theory of mind which seeks to deconstruct how we perceive the world. There are several interpretations of this main theory, which include various forms of idealism, as well as a phenomenology or representationalism. Aside from this, Yogācāra also developed an elaborate analysis of consciousness (vijñāna) and mental phenomena (dharmas), as well as an extensive system of Buddhist spiritual practice, i.e. yoga.

The movement has been traced to the first centuries of the common era and seems to have evolved as some yogis of the Sarvāstivāda and Sautrāntika traditions in north India adopted Mahayana Buddhism. The brothers Asaṅga and Vasubandhu (both c. 4-5th century) are considered the classic philosophers and systematizers of this school, while it is also traditionally attributed by Buddhist believers to the figure of Maitreya-nātha. Yogācāra was later imported to Tibet and East Asia by figures like Shantaraksita (8th century) and Xuanzang (7th-century). Today, Yogācāra ideas and texts continue to be influential subjects of study for Tibetan Buddhism and East Asian Buddhism.

== Doctrine ==
Yogācāra philosophy is primarily meant to aid in the practice of yoga and meditation and thus it also sets forth a systematic analysis of the Mahayana path of mental training (see five paths pañcamārga). Yogācārins made use of ideas from previous traditions, such as Prajñāpāramitā and the Sarvāstivāda Abhidharma tradition, to develop a novel analysis of conscious experience and a corresponding schema for Mahāyāna spiritual practice. Yogācāra sutras such as the Saṅdhinirmocana Sūtra developed various core concepts such as vijñapti-mātra, the ālaya-vijñāna (store consciousness), the turning of the basis (āśraya-parāvṛtti), the three natures (trisvabhāva), and emptiness. These form a complex system, and each can be taken as a point of departure for understanding Yogācāra.

=== The doctrine of vijñapti-mātra ===
One of the main features of Yogācāra philosophy is the concept of vijñapti-mātra. It is often used interchangeably with the term citta-mātra in modern and ancient Yogacara sources. The standard translation of both terms is "consciousness-only" or "mind-only." Several modern researchers object to this translation in favor of alternatives like representation-only. The meaning of this term is at the heart of the modern scholarly disagreement about whether Yogācāra Buddhism can be said to be a form of idealism (as supported by Hopkins and others) or whether it is definitely not idealist (Anacker, Lusthaus, Wayman).

==== Origins ====
According to Lambert Schmithausen, the earliest surviving appearance of this term is in chapter 8 of the Saṅdhinirmocana Sūtra, which has only survived in Tibetan and Chinese translations that differ in syntax and meaning. The passage is depicted as a response by the Buddha to a question which asks "whether the images or replicas (*pratibimba) which are the object (*gocara) of meditative concentration (*samadhi), are different/separate (*bhinna) from the contemplating mind (*citta) or not." The Buddha says they are not different, "Because these images are vijñapti-mātra." The text goes on to affirm that the same is true for objects of ordinary perception.

The term is sometimes used as a synonym with cittamātra (mere citta), a name for the school that suggests idealism. Schmithausen writes that the first appearance of this term is in the Pratyupanna samadhi sutra, which states "this (or: whatever belongs to this) triple world is nothing but mind (or thought: *cittamatra). Why? Because however I imagine things, that is how they appear."

Regarding existing Sanskrit sources, the term appears in the first verse of Vasubandhu's Vimśatikā (Twenty Verses), which states, "This [world] is vijñaptimātra, since it manifests itself as an unreal object (artha), just like the case of those with cataracts seeing unreal hairs in the moon and the like (vijñaptimātram evaitad asad arthāvabhāsanāt yathā taimirikasyāsat keśa candrādi darśanam)." According to Mark Siderits, what Vasubandhu means here is that we are only ever aware of mental images or impressions which manifest themselves as external objects, but "there is actually no such thing outside the mind."

The term also appears in Asaṅga's classic work, the Mahāyānasaṃgraha:

These representations (vijñapti) are mere representations (vijñapti-mātra), because there is no [corresponding] thing/object (artha)...Just as in a dream there appear, even without a thing/object (artha), just in the mind alone, forms/images of all kinds of things/objects like visibles, sounds, smells, tastes, tangibles, houses, forests, land, and mountains, and yet there are no [such] things/objects at all in that [place]. MSg II.6

Another classic statement of the doctrine appears in Dharmakīrti's Pramānaṿārttika (Commentary on Epistemology), which states, "cognition experiences itself, and nothing else whatsoever. Even the particular objects of perception, are by nature just consciousness itself."

=== Arguments for consciousness-only ===
According to the contemporary philosopher Jan Westerhoff, Yogācāra philosophers came up with various arguments in defense of the consciousness-only view. He outlines three main arguments: the explanatory equivalence argument, the causation-resemblance argument, and the constant co-cognition argument.

==== Explanatory equivalence argument ====
This argument is found in Vasubandhu's Viṃśatikā-vijñaptimātratāsiddhi (Twenty Verses) and is an inference to the best explanation. It argues that consciousness-only can provide an account of the same features of experience which the realist explains by appealing to the existence of mind-independent material objects. This is coupled with a principle of ontological parsimony to argue in favor of idealism.

Vasubandhu mentions three key features of experience which are supposed to be explained by matter and refutes them:

1. According to critics, the problem of spatio-temporal determination (or non-arbitrariness in regard to place and time) indicates that there must be some external basis for our experiences, since experiences of any particular object do not occur everywhere and at every time. Vasubandhu responds with the dream argument, which shows how a world created by the mind can still seem to have spatio-temporal localization.
2. The problem of inter-subjective experience (multiple minds experiencing the same world). Vasubandhu counters that mass hallucinations (such as those said to occur to hungry ghosts) caused by the fact they share similar karma (which is here understood as traces or seeds in the mind-stream), show that inter-subjective agreement is possible without positing real external objects.
3. Another criticism states that hallucinations have no pragmatic results, efficacy, or causal function, and thus can be determined to be unreal, but entities we generally accept as being "real" have actual causal results (such as the 'resistance' of external objects) that cannot be of the same class as hallucinations. Against this claim, Vasubandhu argues that waking life is the same as a dream, in which objects have pragmatic effects within the very rules of the dream. He also uses the example of a wet dream to show that mental content can have causal efficacy even outside of a dream.

With these arguments, Vasubandhu believes he has shown that mere cognizance is just as good at explaining the relevant phenomena of experience as any theory of realism that posits external objects. According to Siderits, it is even possible for science to exist within such a framework. As he explains:

One surprising result of this is that an impressions-only theorist could still do science. In doing science we are seeking to find those regularities that help us explain and predict the course of our experience. We are used to thinking that these are to be expressed in terms of laws about the behavior of physical objects. The impressions-only theorist will say they must instead be put in terms of laws governing the transformation of mental streams. But the data to be explained are the same in either case.

Having disposed of various objections, Vasubandhu then appeals to the Indian philosophical principle termed the "Principle of Lightness" (Sanskrit: lāghava, which is similar to Occam's Razor) to rule out realism since vijñapti-mātra is the simpler and "lighter" theory which "posits the least number of unobservable entities."

Another objection that Vasubandhu answers is how one person can influence another's experiences if everything arises from mental karmic seeds in one's mindstream. Vasubandhu argues that "impressions can also be caused in a mental stream by the occurrence of a distinct impression in another suitably linked mental stream." As Siderits notes, this account can explain how it is possible to influence or even totally disrupt (murder) another mind, even if there is no physical medium or object in existence, since a suitably strong enough intention in one mind stream can have effects on another mind stream.

From the mind-only position, it is easier to posit a mind-to-mind causation than to have to explain mind-to-body causation, which the realist must do. However, Siderits questions whether this account is indeed "lighter," since it must make use of multiple interactions between different minds to account for an intentionally created artifact, such as a pot. Since we can be aware of a pot even when we are not "linked" to the potter's intentions (even after the potter is dead), a more complex series of mental interactions must be posited.

Nevertheless, not all interpretations of Yogācāra's view of the external world rely on multiple relations between individual minds. Some interpretations in Chinese Buddhism, such as in Huayan, defended the view of a single shared external world (bhājanaloka) which was still made of consciousness, while some later Indian thinkers like Ratnakīrti (11th century CE) defended a type of non-dual monism according to which the distinction between one's own and other mindstreams (saṃtānāntara) is ultimately unreal.

==== Causation-resemblance argument ====
This argument was famously defended in Dignāga's Ālambanaparīkṣā (Examination of the Object of Consciousness) and its main target is Indian atomism, which was the main theory of matter in the 5th century. The argument is based on the premise that a perception must resemble the perceived object (ālambana) and have been caused by the object. According to this argument, since atoms are not extended, they do not resemble the object of perception (which appears as spatially extended). Furthermore, collections of atoms might resemble the object of perception, but they cannot have caused it. This is because collections of things are unreal in classic Buddhist thought (thus it is a mereological nihilism), since they are composites and composites made of parts do not have any causal efficacy (only individual atoms do).

In disproving the possibility of external objects, Vasubandhu's Vimśatikā similarly attacks Indian theories of atomism and property particulars as incoherent on mereological grounds.

==== Constant co-cognition argument ====
This argument was defended by Dharmakīrti in his Ascertainment of Epistemology (Pramāṇaviniścaya) in which it is referred to as the argument of "the necessity of things only ever being experienced together with experience" (Sanskrit: sahopalambhaniyama). According to Dharmakīrti:

Because [something blue] is not apprehended without the additional qualification of consciousness, [and] because [blue] is apprehended when this [qualification of consciousness] is apprehended, consciousness [itself] has the appearance of blue. There is no external object by itself. (PV 3.335)

According to this argument, any object of consciousness, like blue, cannot be differentiated from the conscious awareness of blue since both are always experienced as one thing. Since we never experience blue without the experience of blue, they cannot be differentiated empirically. For Dharmakīrti, there are only two epistemic instruments (pramāṇa) by which something may be established: [1] direct perception (pratyakṣa) and [2] inference (anumāna). However, external or mind-independent objects cannot be established perceptually since one never apprehends an object apart from the consciousness of it. Furthermore, one cannot establish external objects by inference either since inferences must be based on perceptual evidence. Thus, this is a type of epistemological argument for idealism which attempts to show there is no good reason to accept the existence of mind-independent objects.

There is some ambiguity regarding whether this argument is epistemological or metaphysical in nature, that is, whether its aim is to show that external objects cannot be known or do not exist at all. According to the commentator Manorathanandin, once one has shown that external objects are absolutely unmanifest to consciousness, there is no further need to disprove their existence. Isabelle Ratié explains that this could be because the question of the ontological status of external objects simply becomes irrelevant once one has established that there are no epistemic means by which they could be known in the first place. However, Ratié points out that one could also read Manorathanandin to be saying that the epistemic argument is itself already ontologically committed such that any further disproof of the existence of external objects is not only irrelevant but redundant.

To make this point, Ratié distinguishes between the non-perception (anupalabdhi) of objects which are imperceptible only sometimes and objects which are imperceptible by their very nature. Non-perception alone is not enough to establish the nonexistence of objects which are only imperceptible for some observers and under certain circumstances (the classical example being a piśāca demon who is imperceptible to ordinary human beings, but can be perceived by another piśāca, as well as by yogins). However, the point of the sahopalambhaniyama argument is to show that external objects are never perceptible under any circumstance. Ratié writes, "this might make quite a difference: we can entertain doubts regarding the existence of an entity that is imperceptible to us and in some given circumstances, but is this attitude still an option when it comes to an entity that is by nature absolutely and always unmanifest?" According to the interpretation which takes the sahopalambhaniyama to be ontologically committed, "an absolutely imperceptible object can only be nonexistent."

==== Argument from the impossibility of establishing causation ====
Another argument used by Yogācārins was the "argument from the impossibility of establishing causation." Like the Sautrāntika, the Buddhist representationalist school, Yogācāra held that consciousness only ever experiences a form within cognition. Both schools agreed that consciousness never has access to external objects themselves. However, Yogācāra differed from the representationalists on the question of the cause of the forms in cognition. The representationalists maintained that while external objects were not directly perceptible, the forms within cognition were nonetheless caused by external entities which could be known by inference (anumāna). Yogācārins rejected this, arguing that it was not possible to establish a causal connection between an external object and a form in cognition. This is because in order to infer a causal connection, one must have recourse to: [1] a plurality of perceptions of the co-presence of the cause and effect, and [2] a plurality of perceptions of their co-absence as well. For example, in the case of inferring fire from an instance of seeing smoke, without a plurality of prior perceptions of their co-presence, there would be no grounds for thinking that fire occurs when smoke occurs; and without perceptions of their co-absence there would be no grounds for thinking that smoke does not occur in the absence of fire. Now, we can never have a perception of the co-presence of an external object and a form within cognition, since external objects are never experienced. Similarly, we cannot have a perception of the co-absence of an external object and a form within cognition, because again, consciousness can have no perception of any state of affairs beyond what is taking place within cognition. Without the perceptions of co-presence and co-absence, one cannot even establish correlation, much less causation.

==== Soteriological importance of mind-only ====
Vasubandhu also explains why it is soteriologically important to get rid of the idea of really existing external objects. According to Siderits, this is because:

When we wrongly imagine there to be external objects we are led to think in terms of the duality of 'grasped and grasper', of what is 'out there' and what is 'in here' - in short, of external world and self. Coming to see that there is no external world is a means, Vasubandhu thinks, of overcoming a very subtle way of believing in an 'I'... once we see why physical objects can't exist we will lose all temptation to think there is a true 'me' within. There are really just impressions, but we superimpose on these the false constructions of object and subject. Seeing this will free us from the false conception of an 'I'.

Siderits notes how Kant had a similar notion, that is, without the idea of an objective mind-independent world, one cannot derive the concept of a subjective "I". But Kant drew the opposite conclusion to Vasubandhu, since he held that we must believe in an enduring subject, and thus, also believe in external objects.

=== Analysis of Consciousness ===
Yogācāra gives a detailed explanation of the workings of the mind and the way it constructs the reality we experience. This combines the older Buddhist concept of karma with uniquely Yogācāra innovations, such as its system of eight consciousnesses, including the "storehouse consciousness."

==== Karma ====
An explanation of the Buddhist doctrine of karma (action) is central to Yogācāra, and the school sought to explain important questions such as how moral actions can have effects on individuals long after that action was done, that is, how karmic causality works across temporal distances. Previous Abhidharma schools like the Sautrantika had developed theories of karma based on the notion of "seeds" (bījā) in the mind stream, which are unseen karmic habits (good and bad) which remain until they meet with the necessary conditions to manifest. Yogācāra adopts and expands this theory. Yogācāra posited the "storehouse consciousness" as the container of the seeds, as the storage place for karmic latencies and as a fertile matrix of predispositions that bring karma to a state of fruition. In the Yogācāra system, all experience without exception is said to result from karma or mental intention (cetana), either arising from one's own subliminal seeds or from other minds.

For Yogācāra, the seemingly external or dualistic world is merely a "by-product" (adhipati-phala) of karma. The term vāsanā ("perfuming") is also used when explaining karma. Yogācārins were divided on the issue of whether vāsāna and bija were essentially the same, whether the seeds were the effect of the perfuming, or whether the perfuming simply affected the seeds. The type, quantity, quality and strength of the seeds determine where and how a sentient being will be reborn: one's sex, social status, proclivities, bodily appearance and so forth. The conditioning of the mind resulting from karma is called saṃskāra. Vasubandhu's Treatise on Action (Karmasiddhiprakaraṇa), treats the subject of karma in detail from the Yogācāra perspective.

==== Eight consciousnesses ====
A key innovation of the Yogācāra school was the doctrine of eight consciousnesses. These "eight bodies of consciousnesses" (aṣṭa vijñānakāyāḥ) are: the five sense-consciousnesses (of seeing, hearing, smelling, tasting and bodily sense), mentation (mano or citta), the defiled self-consciousness (kliṣṭamanovijñāna), and the storehouse or substratum consciousness (Skt: ālayavijñāna). Traditional Buddhist descriptions of consciousness taught just the first six vijñānas, each corresponding to a sense base (ayatana) and having their own sense objects (sounds etc). Five are based on the five senses, while the sixth (mano-vijñāna), was seen as the surveyor of the content of the five senses as well as of mental content like thoughts and ideas. Standard Buddhist doctrine held that these eighteen "elements" (dhatus), i.e. six external sense bases (smells, sounds etc.), six internal bases (sense organs like the eye, ear, etc.), and six consciousnesses "exhaust the full extent of everything in the universe, or more accurately, the sensorium." The six consciousnesses are also not substantial entities, but a series or stream of events (dharmas), which arise and vanish very rapidly moment by moment. This is the Abhidharma doctrine of "momentariness" (kṣaṇavada), which Yogācāra also accepts.

Yogācāra expanded the six vijñāna schema into a new system with two new categories. The seventh consciousness developed from the early Buddhist concept of manas, and was seen as the defiled mentation (kliṣṭa-manas) which is obsessed with notions of "self". According to Paul Williams, this consciousness "takes the substratum consciousness as its object and mistakenly considers the substratum consciousness to be a true Self."

==== Ālaya-vijñāna ====
The eighth consciousness, ālaya-vijñāna (storehouse or repository consciousness), was defined as the storehouse of all karmic seeds (bīja), where they gradually matured until ripe, at which point they manifested as karmic consequences. Because of this, it is also called the "mind which has all the seeds" (sarvabījakam cittam), as well as the "basis consciousness" (mūla-vijñāna) and the "appropriating consciousness" (ādānavijñāna). According to the Saṅdhinirmocana Sūtra, this kind of consciousness underlies and supports the six types of manifest awareness, all of which occur simultaneously with the ālaya. William S. Waldron sees this "simultaneity of all the modes of cognitive awareness" as the most significant departure of Yogācāra theory from traditional Buddhist models of vijñāna, which were "thought to occur solely in conjunction with their respective sense bases and epistemic objects." Where Yogācāra posits simultaneity of cognitive modes, the traditional model accepted that these occurred only sequentially.

As noted by Schmithausen, the ālaya-vijñāna, being a kind of vijñāna, has an object as well (as all vijñāna has intentionality). That object is the sentient being's surrounding world, that is to say, the "receptable" or "container" (bhājana) world. This is stated in the 8th chapter of the Saṅdhinirmocana Sūtra, which states that the ādānavijñāna is characterized by "an unconscious (or not fully conscious?) steady perception (or "representation") of the Receptacle (*asaṃvidita-sthira-bhājana-vijñapti)."

The ālaya-vijñāna is also what experiences rebirth into future lives and what descends into the womb to appropriate the fetal material. Therefore, the ālaya-vijñāna's holding on to the body's sense faculties and "profuse imaginings" (prapañca) are the two appropriations which make up the "kindling" or "fuel" (lit. upādāna) that samsaric existence depends upon. Yogācāra thought thus holds that being unaware of the processes going on in the ālaya-vijñāna is an important element of ignorance (avidya). The ālaya is also individual, so that each person has their own ālaya-vijñāna, which is an ever changing process and therefore not a permanent self.

According to Williams, this consciousness "seen as a defiled form of consciousness (or perhaps sub- or unconsciousness), is personal, individual, continually changing and yet serving to give a degree of personal identity and to explain why it is that certain karmic results pertain to this particular individual. The seeds are momentary, but they give rise to a perfumed series which eventually culminates in the result including, from seeds of a particular type, the whole ‘inter-subjective’ phenomenal world." Also, Asanga and Vasubandhu write that the ālaya-vijñāna ‘ceases’ at awakening, becoming transformed into a pure consciousness.

According to the Mahāyānasaṃgraha, the ālayavijñāna has both a common character and an uncommon character. The common character refers to those seeds which ripen into the bhājanaloka, or container world, which is common to all. On the other hand, its uncommon character refers to those seeds which ripen as an individual's own sense faculties. The Mahāyānasaṃgraha states that the remedies (i.e. those which comprise the Buddhist path) counteract the uncommon character of the ālayavijñāna, but not that which is common. That is, although they lack any individual karma of their own, purified persons are nonetheless supported by a consciousness of common seeds and that which is sustained by the discriminations of others. And while buddhas have access to that which is shared in common, i.e. the container world, they nonetheless experience it as pure.

The storehouse consciousness also serves as the basis for container worlds that are uninhabited by sentient beings. According to Buddhist cosmology, when a world is going to perish, beings no longer populate it. However, although there are no longer any beings to perceive it, that container world is nonetheless "mind only," as it still exists in the storehouse consciousnesses of the beings who have departed from it. Similarly, in the case of an uninhabited world in which beings are going to be reborn, such a world also exists in the storehouse consciousnesses of the beings who will be reborn there. As Thomas Wood explains, this means that a world may exist entirely within the minds of sentient beings even though those beings are not directly conscious of it.

According to Waldron, while there were various similar concepts in other Buddhist Abhidharma schools which sought to explain karmic continuity, the ālaya-vijñāna is the most comprehensive and systematic. Waldron notes that the ālaya-vijñāna concept was probably influenced by these theories, particularly the Sautrantika theory of seeds and Vasumitra's theory of a subtle form of mind (suksma-citta).

Regarding the status of the seeds, according to the Chengweishilun, Sthiramati regarded the seeds to be merely nominal (i.e. conventional and not actually real); while on the other hand, Xuanzang took them to be real.

==== Transformations of consciousness ====
Yogācāra sources do not necessarily describe the eight consciousnesses as absolutely separate or substantial phenomena. For example, Kalupahana notes that the Triṃśika describes the various forms of consciousness as transformations and functions of a being's stream of consciousness. (Note: Kalupahana: "The above explanation of alaya-vijnana makes it very different from that found in the Lankavatara. The latter assumes alaya to be the eight consciousness, giving the impression that it represents a totally distinct category. Vasubandhu does not refer to it as the eight, even though his later disciples like Sthiramati and Hsuan Tsang constantly refer to it as such".) These transformations are threefold according to Kalupahana. The first is the ālaya and its seeds, which is the flow or stream of consciousness, without any of the usual projections on top of it. The second transformation is manana, self-consciousness or "Self-view, self-confusion, self-esteem and self-love". It is "thinking" about the various perceptions occurring in the stream of consciousness". The ālaya is defiled by this self-interest. The third transformation is visaya-vijñapti, the "concept of the object". In this transformation the concept of objects is created. By creating these concepts human beings become "susceptible to grasping after the object" as if it were a real object (sad artha) even though it is just a conception (vijñapti).

A similar perspective which emphasizes Yogācāra's continuity with early Buddhism is given by Walpola Rahula. According to Rahula, all the elements of this theory of consciousness with its three layers of vijñāna are already found in the Pāli Canon, corresponding to the terms viññāna (sense cognition), manas (mental function, thinking, reasoning, conception) and citta (the deepest layer of the aggregate of consciousness which retains karmic impressions and the defilements).

=== Account of intersubjectivity ===
Yogācāra has a complex account of intersubjectivity. According to Yogācāra doctrine, sentient beings experience their own mental representations. This means each being, strictly speaking, occupies its own unique sensory world. As Ernest Billings Brewster points out, "every sentient being possesses a 'storehouse consciousness' that contains a sensory world unique to each being." However, these worlds are not cut off from one another. Jessica Zu explains that:

Yogācāra thinkers take it for granted that sentient beings inhabiting different worlds are nonetheless karmically connected, i.e., that each mental stream supported by their respective karmically entangled ālayavijñāna is inevitably connected with many other mental streams and open to be transformed by other mental streams. It is precisely this karmic connectedness that enables Yogācāra philosophers to conceive the possibility and efficacy of intersubjective interplay across different lifeworlds.

Schmithausen observes that, according to the Chengweishi lun, the sense of a surrounding world of things experienced in common by different beings is a result of their taking the images produced in each other's ālayavijñāna as "remote objective supports." That is, on the basis of the remote objective support (i.e. the mental representation in another's mind), one's own mind develops a corresponding image. As the Chengweishi lun states, "[the ālaya- or vipāka-vijñāna] invariably has also a remote objective support because it must rely on an ‘original’ (質) [consisting in an image] developed by [the consciousnesses of] others (他變): only then it develops its own [image]," and "one's own [body] and others' bodies as well as the earth (i.e. the surrounding world) can be mutually experienced [only] because the [corresponding image(s)] developed by [the minds of] others function as the original of one's own [mind, i.e. ālayavijñāna, and vice-versa]."

The remote objective support constitutes a specific type of condition, namely "the condition of dominance" (adhipati-pratyaya). Regarding this, Zhizhou, a grand pupil of Xuanzang's disciple Kuiji, states: "That which has been developed from [the consciousness of] a given sentient being serves directly (sākṣāt) for him as a cognitive object. That which has been developed from [the consciousness of] another constitutes a condition of dominance (adhipati-pratyaya) for that which has been developed from his own [consciousness]; it [thus] also serves remotely as a cognitive object." Zhizhou goes on to explain that what is developed from one's own consciousness is "that which is conformed to," while what is developed from another's consciousness is "that which conforms to." In the example of a person cutting down a tree, when the tree in that person's mind (that which is conformed to) is cut down, the tree in the consciousness of another (that which conforms to) is also cut down. In this way, "that which conforms to" exists in mutual relationship with "that which is conformed to." As such, when the latter is absent, so too is the former.

Dharmakīrti makes a distinction between two types of causes depending on whether one's mental impressions are caused by one's own mind or caused by another’s mind. In the former case, the cause is referred to as upādāna kāraṇa (material cause), while in the latter case the cause is the adhipati-pratyaya (dominant condition). The dominant condition is involved when "the impressions of one person's mind stream are causally related to the mind-cause of another person's mind stream." According to Dharmakīrti, one's perceptions of one's own bodily actions and speech are caused directly by one's own mind as the material cause. On the other hand, the image of one's body and speech in another person's consciousness, though directly caused by their mind, is simultaneously influenced by one's own mind serving as the dominant condition, adhipati-pratyaya.

In response to the problem of solipsism, the assertion that other minds do not exist, Xuanzang maintained that other minds constituted remote objective supports, with Kuiji further incorporating remote objective supports under the category of adhipati-pratyaya, or dominant conditions. As such, the alterity of other minds is preserved, since they are not asserted to be the products of one's own inner psyche. In this way, other minds are not negated. At the same time, although other minds exist and are perceived, they do not violate the principle of mind-only, since they are not extra-mental but depend on one's own consciousness to appear as phenomena for oneself. According to Jessica Zu, "In this framing of intersubjectivity, the problem of one world or many worlds is explained non-dualistically: these lifeworlds are neither the same nor different, neither one nor many, but karmically interconnected." (Note: See also Thich Nhat Hanh on the question of whether the storehouse consciousness is individual or collective: "Store consciousness is neither the same nor different, individual nor collective. Same and different inter-are. Collective and individual give rise to each other. Are my store consciousness and your store consciousness one or two? To say they are two is wrong, and to say that they are one is also wrong. You and I are not one, and we are also not two. [...] My store consciousness is made of yours, just as your store consciousness is made of mine. We cannot say whether they are the same or different, whether there is one store consciousness or many.") This self-other interdependence also has soteriological implications, as it enables ordinary beings to learn from sages who in turn assist those who may purify their own minds by taking up the path to liberation.

In his analysis of Yogācāra philosophy, Thomas Wood critiques the Yogācāra doctrine of the collective hallucination of the shared world, claiming that it is inconsistent with Yogācāra's rejection of a single infinite mind. Regarding the Yogācāra presentation of telepathic connections between many finite minds, Wood states, "the Vijñānavādin has to invoke so much telepathy in order to explain the features of normal perception that he ends up, in effect, with a doctrine that is indistinguishable from monistic idealism." In China, the Huayan Buddhist school rejected the Yogācāra doctrine of many connected yet separate sensory worlds. During Ming dynasty debates between Huayan and Yogācāra, the Huayan exegete Kongyin Zhencheng (1547–1617) appealed to the Huayan notion of an all-encompassing holistic dharmadhātu to argue for a single sensory world which is shared by all beings. (Note: Compare with the notion of ekadhātu (the single realm) in the Anūnatvāpurnatvanirdeśa.)

=== The Three Natures ===
Yogācāra works often define three basic modes or "natures" (svabhāva) of experience. Jonathan Gold explains that "the three natures are all one reality viewed from three distinct angles. They are the appearance, the process, and the emptiness of that same apparent entity." According to Paul Williams, "all things which can be known can be subsumed under these Three Natures." Since this schema is Yogācāra's systematic explanation of the Buddhist doctrine of emptiness (śūnyatā), each of the three natures are also explained as having a lack of own-nature (niḥsvabhāvatā). The Trisvabhāva-nirdeśa (Exposition of the Three Natures) gives a brief definition of these three natures:

What appears is the dependent. How it appears is the fabricated. Because of being dependent on conditions. Because of being only fabrication. The eternal non-existence of the appearance as it is appears: That is known to be the perfected nature, because of being always the same. What appears there? The unreal fabrication. How does it appear? As a dual self. What is its nonexistence? That by which the nondual reality is there.

In detail, three natures (trisvabhāva) are:

1. Parikalpita-svabhāva (the "fully conceptualized" or "imagined" nature). This is the "imaginary" or "constructed" nature, wherein things are incorrectly comprehended based on conceptual construction, through the activity of language and through attachment and erroneous discrimination which attributes intrinsic existence to things. According to the Mahāyānasaṃgraha, it also refers to the appearance of things in terms of subject-object dualism (literally "grasper" and "grasped"). The conceptualized nature is the world of everyday unenlightened people, i.e. samsara. It is false and empty, and does not really exist (Triṃśikā v. 20). According to Xuanzang's Cheng Weishi Lun, this nature is an "absence of an existential nature by its very defining characteristic" (lakṣana-niḥsvabhāvatā). Because these conceptualized natures and distinct characteristics (lakṣana) are wrongly imputed and not truly real, "they are like mirages and blossoms in the sky."
2. Paratantra-svabhāva (literally, "other dependent"), which is the dependently originated nature of dharmas, or the causal flow of phenomena which is erroneously confused into the conceptualized nature. According to Williams, it is "the basis for the erroneous partition into supposedly intrinsically existing subjects and objects which marks the conceptualized nature." Jonathan Gold writes that it is "the causal process of the thing's fabrication, the causal story that brings about the thing's apparent nature." This basis is considered to be an ultimately existing (paramārtha) basis in classical Yogācāra (see Mahāyānasaṃgraha, 2:25). However, as Xuanzang notes, this nature is also empty in that there is an "absence of an existential nature in conditions that arise and perish" (utpatti-niḥsvabhāvatā). That is, the events in this causal flow, while "seeming to have real existence of their own" are actually like magical illusions since "they are said to only be hypothetical and not really exist on their own." As Siderits writes "to the extent that we are thinking of it at all - even if only as the non-dual flow of impressions-only - we are still conceptualizing it."
3. Pariniṣpanna-svabhāva (literally, "fully accomplished", "perfected", "consummated"): This is the true nature of things, the experience of Suchness or Thatness (Tathātā) discovered in meditation unaffected by conceptualization, causality, or duality. It is defined as "the complete absence, in the dependent nature, of objects – that is, the objects of the conceptualized nature" (see Mahāyānasaṃgraha, 2:4). What this refers to is that empty non-dual experience which has been stripped of the duality of the constructed nature through yogic praxis. According to Williams, this is "what has to be known for enlightenment" and Siderits defines it as "just pure seeing without any attempt at conceptualization or interpretation. Now this is also empty, but only of itself as an interpretation. That is, this mode of cognition is devoid of all concepts, and so is empty of being of the nature of the perfected. About it nothing can be said or thought, it is just pure immediacy." According to Xuanzang, this nature has the "absence of any existential nature of ultimate meaning" (paramārtha-niḥsvabhāvatā) since it is "completely free from any clinging to entirely imagined speculations about its identity or purpose. Because of this, it is conventionally said that it does not exist. However, it is also not entirely without a real existence."

==== Two interpretations of the three natures ====
Various Buddhist studies scholars such as Alan Spongberg, Mario D'Amato, Daniel McNamara, and Matthew T. Kapstein have noted that there are two main interpretations of the three natures doctrine among the various texts of the Yogacara corpus. The two models have been named the "pivot" model and "progressive" model by these Western scholars. The "pivot" model, found in texts like the Triṃśikā and the Mahāyānasaṃgraha, presents the dependent nature as a kind of "ontological pivot" since it is the basis for conceptual construction (the imagined nature) and for the perfected nature (which is nothing but the absence of the imagined nature in the dependent nature). As such, the imagined nature is an incorrect way of experiencing the dependent, while the perfected nature is the correct way.

The "progressive model" meanwhile can be found in the Trisvabhāvanirdeśa and in the Mahāyānasūtrālaṃkāra and its bhāṣya. In this model, it is the perfected nature which is the primary element of the three natures schema. Here, the perfected nature is the pure basis of reality, while the other two natures are both impaired by ignorance.

D'Amato explains that the Mahāyānasūtrālaṃkāra and its bhāṣya differ from what he calls the "standard interpretation," since according to the latter, the dependent nature ultimately exists, while according to the former, the dependent exists conventionally, though not ultimately. He says, "In the standard account offered above, the dependent nature is understood to be ultimately real since it is the basis or substratum of reality itself: although the dependent nature is empty of inherent nature, it does ultimately exist." On the other hand, in the view of the Mahāyānasūtrālaṃkāra and its bhāṣya, "it is not the dependent nature that is ultimately real or that functions as the substratum of reality; rather, it is the perfected nature that is ultimately real."

Similarly, the Trisvabhāvanirdeśa states: "The imputed and the other-dependent are to be known as having defiled characteristics. The perfected is asserted to have the characteristic of purity." In this text, the dependent nature is seen as something which must be abandoned since it has the "appearance of duality" (dvayākāra). As such, in this "progressive" model, the dependent nature is the basis for the imagined nature, but not the basis for the perfected nature. The perfected nature on the other hand is a fundamentally pure and true reality (which nevertheless is covered by adventitious defilements). As the Mahāyānasūtrālaṃkāra states:

Reality - which is always without duality, is the basis of error, and is entirely inexpressible - does not have the nature of discursivity. It is to be known, abandoned, and purified. It should properly be thought of as naturally immaculate, since it is purified from defilements, as are space, gold, and water.

Furthermore, according to the Trisvabhāvanirdeśa (TSN 17-20), the imagined and the dependent are inseparable (abhinna) from and nondual with the perfected. This is a key difference between this model and the pivot model, where the dependent nature is regarded as the fulcrum of reality. Also, as regards the niḥsvabhāvatā, or insubstantiality, of the three natures, where the Triṃśika emphasizes "distinctly different types of insubstantiality corresponding to each of the three natures," the Trisvabhāvanirdeśa treats the three natures' inseparability in light of a "common nonduality." Another difference between these sources is that in the Triṃśikā, the main model of liberation is a radical transformation of the basis (āśrayaparāvṛtti). The Trisvabhāvanirdeśa meanwhile claims that liberation occurs through knowledge of the three natures as they are (in their nonduality).

Some scholars, like McNamara, argue that the pivot and progressive models are incompatible, ontologically and soteriologically. On the other hand, Kapstein thinks that it is possible that the Trisvabhāvanirdeśa is attempting to reconcile them. These differences have also led some scholars (Kapstein and Thomas Wood) to question the attribution of the Trisvabhāvanirdeśa to Vasubandhu.

==== Divisions of consciousness and their relationship to the three natures ====
Different Yogācāra philosophers analyzed consciousness into various parts or divisions (bhāga). According to Nanda, consciousness was divided into a seeing part (darśana-bhāga) and a seen, or image part (nimitta-bhāga). Dignāga accepted a third part, the self-cognizing part (svasaṃvitti-bhāga), which refers to consciousness' reflexive knowing within any act of cognition. Dharmapāla added to this yet a fourth part, the cognition of self-cognition, which is the resulting awareness that one is self-aware.

These philosophers differed on the question of the relationship of the various divisions of consciousness to the three natures (trisvabhāva). For Nanda, the seeing part of consciousness belonged to the dependent nature (paratantra-svabhāva), while the seen part belonged to the imagined (parikalpita-svabhāva). According to Dharmapāla, the seeing part, seen part, and the self-cognizing part all belong to the dependent nature. For Dharmapāla, it is only when false notions are applied to them (such as existence, nonexistence, identity, difference, etc.) that the seeing and seen parts can be called imagined, but they are otherwise real.

While Sthiramati was influenced by Dignāga's three-bhāga theory, he held that the self-cognizing part alone belonged to the dependent nature (with the seeing and seen parts both belonging to the imagined). Thus, for Sthiramati, consciousness really only has one part, and in this he differed from Dharmapāla and Xuanzang. According to Zhihua Yao, the one-bhāga theory is associated with the classical Nirākāravāda position according to which consciousness is not subject to any divisions.

=== Emptiness ===
The central meaning of emptiness (śūnyatā) in Yogācāra is a twofold "absence of duality." The first element of this is the unreality of any conceptual duality such as "physical" and "non-physical", "self" and "other". To define something conceptually is to divide the world into what it is and what it is not, but the world is a causal flux that does not accord with conceptual constructs. The second element of this is a perceptual duality between the sensorium and its objects, between what is "external" and "internal", between subject (grāhaka, literally "grasper") and object (grāhya, "grasped"). This is also an unreal superimposition, since there is really no such separation of inner and outer, but an interconnected causal stream of mentality which is falsely divided up.

An important difference between the Yogācāra conception of emptiness and the Madhyamaka conception is that in classical Yogācāra, emptiness does exist (as a real absence) and so does consciousness (which is that which is empty, the referent of emptiness), while Madhyamaka refuses to endorse such existential statements. The Madhyāntavibhāga for example, states "the imagination of the nonexistent [abhūta-parikalpa] exists. In it duality does not exist. Emptiness, however, exists in it," which indicates that even though that which is dualistically imagined (subjects and objects), is unreal and empty, their basis does exist (i.e. the dependently arisen conscious manifestation).

The Yogācāra school also gave special significance to the Āgama sutra called Lesser Discourse on Emptiness (parallel to the Pali Cūḷasuññatasutta, MN 121) and relies on this sutra in its explanations of emptiness. According to Gadjin Nagao, this sutra affirms that "emptiness includes both being and non-being, both negation and affirmation."

==== Disagreement with Madhyamaka ====
Indian sources indicate that Yogācāra thinkers sometimes debated with the defenders of the Madhyamaka tradition. However, there is disagreement among contemporary Western and traditional Buddhist scholars about the degree to which they were opposed, if at all. The main difference between these schools was related to issues of existence and the nature of emptiness. The Chinese pilgrim Yijing (635–713) concisely summarized the differences thus: “For Yogācāra the real exists, but the conventional does not exist; and [Yogācāra] takes the three natures as foundational. For Madhyamaka the real does not exist, but the conventional does exist; and actually the two truths are primary". Garfield and Westerhoff write that "Yogācāra is both ontologically and epistemologically foundationalist; Madhyamaka is antifoundationalist in both senses." Another way to state this key difference is that Madhyamaka defends a "global antirealism" while Yogācāra "restrict[s] the scope of their antirealism to the external and the conventional".

While Madhyamaka generally states that asserting the ultimate existence or non-existence of anything (including emptiness) was inappropriate, Yogācāra treatises (like the Madhyāntavibhāga) often assert that the dependent nature (paratantra-svabhāva) really exists and that emptiness is an actual absence that also exists ultimately. In a similar fashion, Asaṅga states "that of which it is empty does not truly exist; that which is empty truly exists: emptiness makes sense in this way". He also describes emptiness as "the non-existence of the self, and the existence of the no-self." Classical Yogācāras like Vasubandhu and Sthiramati also affirm the reality of conscious appearance, i.e. that truly existent stream of dependent arisen and constantly changing consciousness which projects false and illusory subjective minds and their cognitive objects. It is this real flow of conscious transformation (vijñānapariṇāma) which is said to be empty (of duality and conceptuality). Against the radically anti-foundationalist interpretation of Madhyamaka, the classic Yogācāra position is that there is something (the dependent nature which is mere-consciousness) that "exists" (sat) independently of conceptual designation (prajñapti), and that it is this real thing (vāstu) which is said to be empty of duality and yet is a basis for all dualistic conceptions.

Furthermore, Yogācāra thinkers like Asaṅga and Vasubandhu critiqued those who "adhere to non-existence" (nāstikas, vaināśkas, likely referring to certain Madhyamikas) because they saw them as straying into metaphysical nihilism (abhāvānta, see Vimśatikā v. 10). They held that there was really something which could be said to "exist", that is, vijñapti, and that was what is described as being "empty" in their system. For Yogācāra, all conventional existence must be based on something which is real (dravya). Sthiramati argues that we cannot say that everything exists conventionally (saṁvṛtisat) or nominally (prajñaptisat) and that nothing truly exists in an ultimate fashion (which would entail a global conventionalism and nominalism without any metaphysical ground). For Sthiramati, this view is false because "what would follow is non-existence even conventionally. That is because conventions are not possible without something to depend upon (or, “without taking up something”—upādāna)." Thus, for Sthiramati, consciousness (vijñana) "since it is dependently arisen, exists as dravya (substance)."

The Bodhisattvabhūmi likewise argues that it is only logical to speak of emptiness if there is something (i.e. dharmatā, an ultimate nature) that is empty. The Bodhisattvabhūmi's Chapter on Reality (Tattvārthapaṭala) states that emptiness is "wrongly grasped" by those who "do not accept that of which something is empty, nor do they accept that which is empty". This is because "emptiness holds good only as long as that of which something is [said to be] empty does not exist, but on the other hand, that which is empty exists. If, however, all [elements involved in this relation] were non-existent, in what respect, what would be empty, [and] of what?" For the Bodhisattvabhūmi, the "right" way to understand emptiness is "one regards that something is empty of that which does not exist in it and correctly comprehends that what remains there does actually exist here". That which "remains" and "actually exists" is the true reality, the thing itself (vastumātra), the foundation (āśraya) which remains (avaśiṣṭa) after all conceptual constructs have been removed.

Yogācārins also criticized certain Madhyamaka accounts of conventional truth, that is, the view which says that conventional truth is merely erroneous cognitive processes (designations, expressions, and linguistic conventions) which project an inherent nature. The Yogācārabhūmi's Viniścayasaṃgrahanī states that either Madhyamakas see conventional reality as produced by linguistic expressions and also by causal forces, or they see it as produced merely by linguistic expressions and convention. If the former, then Madhyamikas must accept the reality of causal efficacy, which is a kind of existence (since things which are causally produced can be said to exist in some way). If the latter, then without any basis for linguistic expression and convention, it makes no sense to even use these terms (for Yogācāra these conventions must have some kind of referential basis).

Yogācārins further held that if all phenomena are equally conventional and unreal in the same way this would lead to laxity in ethics and in following the path, in other words to moral relativism. The basic idea behind this critique is that if only convention exists (as Madhyamaka claims) and there are no truths that are independent of convention and linguistic expression, there would be no epistemic foundations for critiquing worldly (non-buddhist) conventions and affirming other conventions as closer to the truth (like the conventions used by Buddhists to establish their ethics and their teachings).

Madhyamaka thinkers like Bhaviveka, Candrakirti and Shantideva also critiqued Yogācāra views in their works for what they saw as an improper reification (samāropa) of mind and for a nihilistic denial of conventional truth. The work of Xuanzang (7th century) also contains evidence for this Indian debate.

=== Mental images: true vs false ===
An important debate about the reality of mental appearances within Yogācāra led to its later subdivision into two systems of Satyākāravāda (True Aspectarians, also known as Sākāravāda) and Alīkākāravāda (False Aspectarians, also known as Nirākāravāda). They are also termed "Aspectarians" (ākāra) and "Non-Aspectarians" (anākāra). The core issue is whether appearances or “aspects” (rnam pa, ākāra) of objects in the mind are treated as true (bden pa, satya) or false (rdzun pa, alīka). While this division did not exist in the works of the early Yogācāra philosophers, tendencies similar to these views can be discerned in the works of Yogācāra thinkers like Dharmapāla (c. 530–561?) and Sthiramati (c. 510–570?). According to Zhihua Yao, Dharmapāla was a Sākāravādin, while Sthiramati was a Nirākāravādin.

Davey K. Tomlinson describes the difference between the Nirākāravāda and Sākāravāda with reference to later Yogācāra scholars from Vikramaśilā as follows:

On one hand is the Nirākāravāda, typified by Ratnākaraśānti (ca. 970–1045); on the other, the Sākāravāda, articulated by his colleague and critic Jñānaśrīmitra (ca. 980–1040). The Nirākāravādin argues that all appearances do not really exist. They are ersatz or false (alīka). Ephemeral forms appear to us but are the erroneous construction of ignorance, which fundamentally characterizes our existence as suffering beings in saṃsāra. In the ultimately real experience of an awakened buddha, no appearances show up at all. Pure experience, unstained by false appearance (which is nirākāra, “without appearance”), is possible. The Sākāravādin, on the other hand, defends the view that all conscious experience is necessarily the experience of a manifest appearance (consciousness is sākāra, or constitutively “has appearance”). Manifest appearances, properly understood, are really real. A buddha's experience has appearances, and there is nothing about this fact that makes a buddha's experience mistaken.

According to Bodhibhadra, the difference between the Sākāravāda and Nirākāravāda is that where the former regards images (ākāra) as belonging to the dependent nature (paratantrasvabhāva), the latter takes images to belong to the imagined nature (parikalpitasvabhāva). Thus, according to the Nirākāravāda, images are "[as much false as] the hair seen by one suffering from partial blindness." Furthermore, Bodhibhadra explains that where the Sākāravādins argue that knowledge is always endowed with images, the Nirākāravādins maintain that in non-conceptual knowledge (nirvikalpajñāna) "all objects never appear."

Similarly, Mokṣākaragupta states that for Sākāravāda, "All this that is commonly known to be existent as the body or object [of its activity] is none other than knowledge." As such, for the Sākāravādin, although free of the imaginary relation of cognitum and cognizer, which is the product of logical construction (kalpanā), knowledge is nonetheless endowed with various images. On the other hand, Mokṣākaragupta explains that in the Nirākāravāda view, "The essence of knowledge is not stained by the specks of any images and resembles a pure crystal [or the clear sky of an autumnal midday]. Those images of cognition (ākāra) are indeed not real, and become perceptible being shown by nescience (avidyā). Therefore, the cognized is not existent in reality; and since the cognized is inexistent, the quality of cognizer which is ascribed to knowledge in relation to the (cognized) is also inexistent."

According to Yaroslav Komarovski the distinction is as follows:

Although Yogācāras in general do not accept the existence of an external material world, according to Satyākāravāda its appearances or “aspects” (rnam pa, ākāra) reflected in consciousness have a real existence, because they are of one nature with the really existent consciousness, their creator. According to Alīkākāravāda, neither external phenomena nor their appearances and/in the minds that reflect them really exist. What exists in reality is only primordial mind (ye shes, jñāna), described as self-cognition (rang rig, svasaṃvedana/ svasaṃvitti) or individually self-cognizing primordial mind (so so(r) rang gis rig pa’i ye shes).

==== Two types of Alīkākāravāda ====
The Alīkākāravāda was divided into two camps: [1] the Samala-Alīkākāravāda and [2] the Nirmala-Alīkākāravāda. While both, against the Satyākāravāda position, agreed that images (ākāra) are false, the Samala-Alīkākāravādins nonetheless maintained that buddhas still experience images, but knowing them to be false, remain free of delusion. On the other hand, according to Nirmala-Alīkākāravādins, buddhas experience no images whatsoever. For those who accepted that buddhas still experience unreal images, a buddha possesses two types of gnosis: [1] non-conceptual gnosis, which knows the ultimate truth, and [2] a pure mundane gnosis, which is connected with conventional truth and knows the multiplicity of phenomena. Those who upheld that a buddha experiences no images at all argued that a buddha has only non-conceptual gnosis. According to this latter view, while a buddha experiences no images, appearances of a buddha's qualities, such as the buddha's form-bodies, arise in the mental continua of disciples in the manner of a wish-granting jewel spontaneously fulfilling all wishes (on the basis of non-conceptual gnosis, compassion, and a buddha's former aspirations).

Regarding the view of the famous Nirākāravāda proponent Ratnākaraśānti, although reality is free of images, in order to interact with and benefit sentient beings in saṃsāra, a buddha deliberately retains a small amount of error, and thus continues to experience images while knowing them to be false.

=== Meditation and awakening ===
As the name of the school suggests, meditation practice is central to the Yogācāra tradition. Yogācāra texts prescribe various yogic practices such as mindfulness and the four investigations, out of which a revolutionary and radically transformative understanding of the non-duality of self and other is said to arise. This process is referred to as āśraya-parāvṛtti ("overturning the cognitive basis", or "revolution of the basis"), which refers to "overturning the conceptual projections and imaginings which act as the base of our cognitive actions." This event is seen as the transformation of the basic mode of cognition into jñāna (knowledge, direct knowing), which is seen as a non-dual knowledge that is non-conceptual (nirvikalpa), i.e., "devoid of interpretive overlay". Roger R. Jackson describes this as a "'fundamental unconstructed awareness' (mūla-nirvikalpa-jñāna)". When this knowledge arises, the eight consciousnesses come to an end and are replaced by direct knowings. According to Lusthaus:

Overturning the Basis turns the five sense consciousnesses into immediate cognitions that accomplish what needs to be done (kṛtyānuṣṭhāna-jñāna). The sixth consciousness becomes immediate cognitive mastery (pratyavekṣaṇa-jñāna), in which the general and particular characteristics of things are discerned just as they are. This discernment is considered nonconceptual (nirvikalpa-jñāna). Manas becomes the immediate cognition of equality (samatā-jñāna), equalizing self and other. When the Warehouse Consciousness finally ceases it is replaced by the Great Mirror Cognition (Mahādarśa-jñāna) that sees and reflects things just as they are, impartially, without exclusion, prejudice, anticipation, attachment, or distortion. The grasper-grasped relation has ceased. ..."purified" cognitions all engage the world in immediate and effective ways by removing the self-bias, prejudice, and obstructions that had prevented one previously from perceiving beyond one's own narcissistic consciousness. When consciousness ends, true knowledge begins. Since enlightened cognition is nonconceptual its objects cannot be described.

=== Five Categories of Beings ===
One of the more controversial Yogācāra teachings was the five "categories of beings" or "lineages" (gotra), which was an extension of the teachings on the seeds of the storehouse consciousness. This teaching states that sentient beings have certain innate seeds that determine their capability of achieving a particular state of enlightenment and no other. Thus, beings were placed into five categories:

1. Beings whose innate seeds gave them the capacity to practice the bodhisattva path and achieve full Buddhahood
2. Beings whose innate seeds gave them the capacity to achieve the state of a pratyekabuddha (private Buddha)
3. Beings whose innate seeds gave them the capacity to achieve the state of an arhat
4. Beings whose innate seeds had an indeterminate nature, and could potentially be any of the above
5. Beings whose innate seeds were incapable of achieving enlightenment ever because they lacked any wholesome seeds

The fifth class of beings, the icchantika, were described in various Mahayana sutras as being incapable of achieving enlightenment, unless in some cases through the aid of a Buddha or Bodhisattva. Nevertheless, the notion was highly criticized by later Mahayanists who supported the universalist doctrine of ekayana. This tension is important in East Asian Buddhist history and later East Asian Yogācārins attempted to resolve the dispute by softening their stance on the five categories.

=== Modern disagreement on the meaning of vijñapti-mātra ===
There is a lively debate over how exactly Yogācāra, and specifically the concept of vijñapti-mātra, should be understood in the context of Western philosophy. In earlier Western scholarship, and among some contemporaries, Yogācāra is understood as a form of idealism, such as Berkeley's subjective idealism that denies the existence of an external, objective world and asserts that reality consists solely of minds and their ideas. However, there is also a camp of authors who assert that Yogācāra is best understood as a form of soteriological phenomenology. Under this interpretation, Yogācāra is not making claims about what "ultimately exists", but is an epistemic and therapeutic project aimed at understanding how experience is cognitively constructed, interpreted, and reified (i.e. how the mind mistakenly treats these experiences as independent realities, thus causing suffering).

==== Idealism ====
According to Bruce Cameron Hall, the interpretation of this doctrine as a form of subjective or absolute idealism has been "the most common 'outside' interpretation of Vijñānavāda, not only by modern writers, but by its ancient opponents, both Hindu and Buddhist." Scholars such as Jay Garfield, Saam Trivedi, Nobuyoshi Yamabe, Paul Williams, and Sean Butler argue that Yogācāra is similar to idealism (and they compare it to the idealisms of Kant and Berkeley), though they note that it is its own unique form and that it might be confusing to categorize it as such.

The German scholar and philologist Lambert Schmithausen affirms that Yogācāra sources teach a type of idealism which is supposed to be a middle way between Abhidharma realism and what it often considered a nihilistic position which only affirms emptiness as the ultimate. Schmithausen notes that philological study of Yogācāra texts shows that they clearly reject the independent existence of mind and the external world. He also notes that the current trend in rejecting the idealistic interpretation might be related to the unpopularity of idealism among Western academics. Florin Deleanu likewise affirms the idealist nature of Yogācāra texts, while also underscoring how Yogācāra retains a strong orientation to a soteriology which aims at contemplative realization of an ultimate reality that is an ‘inexpressible essence’ (nirabhilāpyasvabhāva) beyond any subject-object duality.

Similarly, Jonathan Gold writes that the Yogācāra thinker Vasubandhu can be said to be an idealist (similar to Kant), in the sense that for him, everything in experience as well as its causal support is mental, and thus he gives causal priority to the mental. At the same time however, this is only in the conventional realm, since "mind" is just another concept and true reality for Vasubandhu is ineffable, "an inconceivable 'thusness' (tathatā)." Indeed, the Vimśatikā states that the very idea of vijñapti-mātra must also be understood to be itself a self-less construction and thus vijñapti-mātra is not the ultimate truth (paramārtha-satya) in Yogācāra. Thus according to Gold, while Vasubandhu's vijñapti-mātra can be said to be a “conventionalist idealism”, it is to be seen as unique and different from Western forms, especially Hegelian Absolute Idealism.

==== Mere representation ====
The interpretation of Yogācāra as a type of idealism was standard until recently, when it began to be challenged by scholars such as Kochumuttom, Anacker, Kalupahana, Dunne, Lusthaus, Powers, and Wayman. (Note: Alex Wayman, A Defense of Yogacara Buddhism. Philosophy East and West, Volume 46, Number 4, October 1996, pages 447-476: "Of course, the Yogacara put its trust in the subjective search for truth by way of a samadhi. This rendered the external world not less real, but less valuable as the way of finding truth. The tide of misinformation on this, or on any other topic of Indian lore comes about because authors frequently read just a few verses or paragraphs of a text, then go to secondary sources, or to treatises by rivals, and presume to speak authoritatively. Only after doing genuine research on such a topic can one begin to answer the question: why were those texts and why do the moderns write the way they do?")

Some scholars like David Kalupahana argue that it is a mistake to conflate the terms citta-mātra (which is sometimes seen as a different, more metaphysical position) with vijñapti-mātra (which need not be idealist). However, Deleanu points out that Vasubandhu clearly states in his Twenty Verses and Abhidharmakosha that vijñapti and citta are synonymous. Nevertheless, different alternative translations for vijñapti-mātra have been proposed, such as representation-only, ideation-only, impressions-only and perception-only.

Alex Wayman notes that one's interpretation of Yogācāra will depend on how the qualifier mātra is to be understood in this context, and he objects to interpretations which claim that Yogācāra rejects the external world altogether, preferring translations such as "amounting to mind" or "mirroring mind" for citta-mātra. For Wayman, what this doctrine means is that "the mind has only a report or representation of what the sense organ had sensed." The representationalist interpretation is also supported by Stefan Anacker.

According to Thomas Kochumuttom, Yogācāra is a realistic pluralism which does not deny the existence of individual beings. Kochumuttom argues that Yogācāra is not idealism since it denies that absolute reality is a consciousness, that individual beings are transformations or illusory appearances of an absolute consciousness. Thus, for Kochumuttom, vijñapti-mātra means "mere representation of consciousness," a view which states "that the world as it appears to the unenlightened ones is mere representation of consciousness". Furthermore, according to Kochumuttom, in Yogācāra "the absolute state is defined simply as emptiness, namely the emptiness of subject-object distinction. Once thus defined as emptiness (sunyata), it receives a number of synonyms, none of which betray idealism."

==== Soteriological phenomenology ====
According to Dan Lusthaus, the vijñapti-mātra theory is closer in some ways to Western Phenomenological theories and Epistemological Idealism. However, it is not a form of metaphysical idealism because Yogācāra rejects the construction of any type of metaphysical or ontological theories. Moreover, Western idealism lacks any counterpart to karma, samsara or awakening, all of which are central for Yogācāra. Regarding vijñapti-mātra, Lusthaus translates it as "nothing but conscious construction" and states it is a kind of trick built into consciousness which "projects and constructs a cognitive object in such a way that it disowns its own creation - pretending the object is 'out there' - in order to render that object capable of being appropriated." This reification of cognition aids in constructing the notion of a permanent and independent self, which is believed to appropriate and possess external 'things'. Yogācāra offers an analysis and meditative means to negate this reification, thereby also negating the notion of a solid self. According to Lusthaus, this analysis is not a rejection of external phenomena, and it does not grant foundational or transcendent status to consciousness. In this interpretation, instead of offering an ontological theory, Yogācāra focuses on understanding and eliminating the underlying tendencies (anuśaya) that lead to clinging concepts and theories, which are just cognitive projections (pratibimba, parikalpita). Thus, for Lusthaus, the orientation of the Yogācāra school is largely consistent with the thinking of the Pāli nikāyas and seeks to realign Mahayana with early Buddhist theory.

== Practice ==
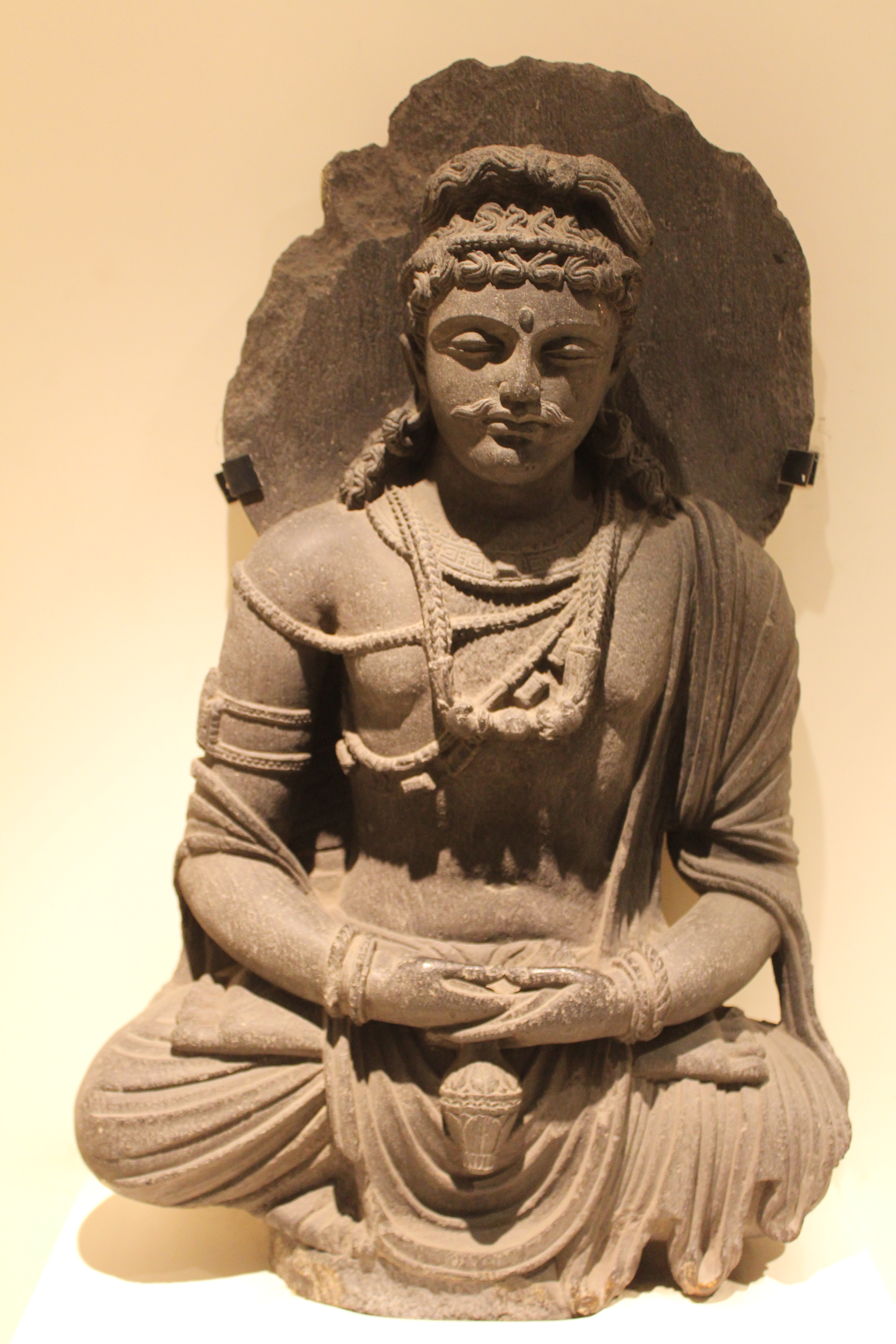
Maitreya meditating, 2nd century CE, Loriyan Tangai, Indian Museum, Kolkata

A key early source for the yogic practices of Indian Yogācāra is the encyclopedic Yogācārabhūmi-Śāstra (YBh, Treatise on the Foundation for Yoga Practitioners). The YBh presents a structured exposition of the Mahāyāna Buddhist path of yoga (here referring to spiritual practice in general) from a Yogācāra perspective and relies in both Āgama/Nikāya texts and Mahāyāna sūtras while also being influenced by Vaibhāṣika Abhidharma. According to some scholars, this text can be traced to communities of yogācāras, which initially referred not to a philosophical school, but to groups of meditation specialists whose main focus was Buddhist yoga. Other Yogācāra texts which also discuss meditation and spiritual practice (and show some relationship with the YBh) include the Saṃdhinirmocanasūtra, the Madhyāntavibhāga, Mahāyānasūtrālaṃkāra, Dharmadharmatāvibhāga and Asanga's Mahāyānasaṃgraha.

The YBh discusses various topics relevant to the bodhisattva practice, including: the eight different forms of dhyāna (meditative absorptions), the three samādhis, different types of liberation (vimokṣa), meditative attainments (samāpatti) such as nirodhasamāpatti, the five hindrances (nivaraṇa), the various types of foci (ālambana) or 'images' (nimitta) used in meditation, the various types contemplative antidotes (pratipakṣa) against the afflictions (like contemplating death, unattractiveness, impermanence, and suffering), the practice of śamatha through "the nine aspects of resting the mind" (navākārā cittasthitiḥ), the practice of insight (vipaśyanā), mindfulness of breathing (ānāpānasmṛti), how to understand the four noble truths, the thirty-seven factors of Awakening (saptatriṃśad bodhipakṣyā dharmāḥ), the four immeasurables (apramāṇa), and how to practice the six perfections (pāramitā).

=== Bodhisattva path ===
Yogācāra sources like the Abhidharmasamuccaya, the Chéng Wéishì Lùn and the commentaries to the Mahāyānasaṃgraha and the Mahāyānasūtrālamkāra also contain various descriptions of the main stages of the bodhisattva path. These Yogācāra sources integrate the Mahayana teaching of the ten bodhisattva stages (bhūmis) with the earlier Abhidharma outline of the path called the "five paths" (pañcamārga), to produce a Mahayanist version of "five stages" (pañcāvasthā). In classic Yogācāra, this bodhisattva path is said to last for three incaculable eons (asaṃkhyeya kalpas), i.e. millions upon millions of years.

The five paths or stages are outlined in Yogācāra sources as follows:

1. Path of accumulation (sambhāra-mārga, 資糧位), in which a bodhisattva gives rise to bodhicitta, and works on the two accumulations of merit (puṇya) and wisdom (jñana). These are linked with the practice of the six perfections. In this first stage of the path, one attains merit by doing good deeds like giving (dana) and one also accumulates wisdom by listening to the Mahayana teachings many times, contemplating them and meditating on them. One also associates with good spiritual friends. According to the Mahāyānasaṃgraha, at this stage the bodhisattva focuses on accumulating wholesome roots (kuśalamūla) and on permeating one's mind with learning (bahuśrutaprabhāvita). This leads to the accumulation of great faith and conviction in the Mahayana and in the principle of consciousness-only.
2. Path of engagement (prayoga-mārga, 加行位), also termed "the stage of the practice of faith and conviction" (adhimukticaryābhūmi). Here, a bodhisattva practices morality, meditation, and wisdom in order to quell the manifest activities of the two types of obscurations: emotionally afflictive and cognitive. While their active elements are quelled, they remain as seeds in the foundation consciousness. Furthermore, one also cultivates the "factors conducive to penetration", which consists of the "four investigations" and the "four correct cognitions". These are ways of contemplating the truth of mind-only and lead to the "entrance into the principle of cognizance-only" (vijñaptimātrapraveśa) as well as to "the certainty as to the non-existence of the object" (arthābhāvaniścaya). At this stage one relies on the fourth dhyana and also attains various samadhis (meditative concentrations). The final stage of this path which is just before the path of seeing is called "the elimination of the ideation of cognizance-only" (vijñaptimātrasaṃjñāvibhāvana). As the Mahāyānasaṃgraha states, at this point, the realization of the absolute nature (pariniṣpannasvabhāvabuddhi) eliminates the very "perception of mind-only" (vijñaptimātratābuddhi). The resulting wisdom is described by Asanga as "the non-conceptual cognition (nirvikalpakajñāna) in which the object (ālambana) and the subject (ālambaka) are completely identical (samasama)."
3. Path of seeing (darśana-mārga, 見道位), at this stage (which lasts for only a few moments), a bodhisattva attains an untainted knowledge (Skt. anāsrava-jñāna, 無漏智) into emptiness, the non-duality of self and other, and consciousness-only. The Cheng wei shi lun describes this knowledge which realises Suchness (tathatā) as being "entirely undifferentiated (samasama) from Suchness since both are free from the characteristics (lakṣaṇa) of subject (grāhaka) and object (grāhya)." This stage is equated with the first bodhisattva stage, the stage of joy. At this point, one is a proper noble (arya) bodhisattva instead of just a beginner.
4. Path of cultivation (bhāvanā-mārga, 修道位), at this stage, a bodhisattva continues to train themselves in two main cognitions in order to fully eliminate all the seeds of the two types of obscurations. They train in the non-conceptual gnosis (nirvikalpakajñāna) of ultimate reality, and the wordly or subsequent knowledge (pṛṣṭhtalabdhajñāna) which knows conventional reality as illusory, and is yet able to conceptually understand it and use it for guiding sentient beings according to their needs. Part of this path requires effort, as the bodhisattva is said to "repeatedly (abhīkṣṇam) cultivate the non-conceptual cognition" (Cheng wei shi lun). However, after a certain point one advances effortlessly. This path corresponds to the second to ninth stages of the bodhisattva path. The Mahāyānasaṃgraha states that at this stage the yogin "dwells in intense cultivation for hundreds of thousands of koṭis of niyutas [an astronomical number] of aeons and consequently attains the transformation of the basis (āśrayaparavṛtti)".
5. Path of fulfillment (niṣṭhā-mārga), also known as the path of no more learning (aśaikṣa-mārga, 無學位) in other sources. This is equivalent to complete Buddhahood. It also entails attaining the three bodies (trikāya) of the Buddha (a doctrine which was also invented by the Yogācāra school).

=== Bodhisattva practice ===
The Bodhisattvabhūmi discusses the Yogācāra school's specifically Mahāyāna forms of practice which are tailored to bodhisattvas. The aim of the bodhisattva's practice in the Bodhisattvabhūmi is the wisdom (prajñā) which realizes of the inexpressible Ultimate Reality (tathata) or the 'thing-in-itself (vastumatra), which is essenceless and beyond the duality (advaya) of existence (bhāva) and non-existence (abhāva).

The Bodhisattvabhūmi outlines several practices of bodhisattvas, including the six perfections (pāramitā), the thirty-seven factors of Awakening, and the four immeasurables. Two key practices which are unique to bodhisattvas in this text are the four investigations and the four correct cognitions or "the four kinds of understanding in accordance with true reality". These two sets of four practices and cognitions are also taught in the Abhidharmasamuccaya and its commentaries.

==== The four investigations and four correct cognitions ====
The four investigations (catasraḥ paryeṣaṇāḥ) and the corresponding four correct cognitions (catvāri yathābhūtaparijñānāni) are a set of original contemplations found in Yogācāra works. These were seen as very important contemplative methods by the authors of the Bodhisattvabhūmi. They were considered to lead to awakening, and were linked with the thirty-seven factors leading to Awakening.

The four investigations and the corresponding four correct cognitions (which are said to arise out of the investigations) are:

1. The investigation of the names [of things] (nāmaparyeṣaṇā), leads to correct cognition resulting from the investigation of names just for what they are, which is "just names" (nāmamātra), i.e. arbitrary linguistic signs.
2. The investigation of things (vastuparyeṣaṇā), leads to correct cognition resulting from the investigation of things. One sees things just for what they are, namely a mere presence or a thing-in-itself (vastumātra). One understands that this is apart from all labels and is inexpressible (nirabhilāpya).
3. The investigation of verbal designations suggesting and portraying an intrinsic nature (svabhāva-prajñapti-paryeṣaṇā), leads to correct cognition resulting from the investigation of such designations. One sees the designations just for what they are, namely as mere designations (prajñaptimātratā). Thus, one sees the idea of intrinsic nature to be illusory like a hallucination or a dream.
4. The investigation of verbal designations expressing individuation and differences (viśeṣaprajñaptiparyeṣaṇā), leads to correct cognition resulting from the investigation of such designations. One sees the designations just for what they are, namely as mere designations. For example, a thing may be designated as existing or non-existing, but such designations do not apply to true reality or the thing-in-itself.

The practice which leads to the realization of the true nature of things is based on the elimination of all conceptual proliferations (prapañca) and ideations (saṃjñā) that one superimposes on true reality. The YBh states that the yogin must "repeatedly remove any ideation conducive to the proliferation directed at all phenomena and should consistently dwell on the thing-in-itself by a non-conceptualizing mental state which is focused on grasping only the object perceived without any characteristics".

==== Four prayogas ====
Various Yogācāra sources provide a four step process of realization leading to the path of seeing, these four are the four yogic practices (prayogas):

- Yogic practice of observation (upalambha-prayoga) - Outer objects are observed to be nothing but mind.
- Yogic practice of non-observation (anupalambha-prayoga) - Outer objects are not observed as such
- Yogic practice of observation and non-observation (upalambhānupalambha-prayoga) - Outer objects being unobservable, a mind cognizing them is not observed either
- Yogic practice of double non-observation (nopalambhopalambha-prayoga) - Not observing both, nonduality is observed

This process is conceisely explained in the Trisvabhāvanirdeśa which says "through the observation of it being merely mind, a knowable object is not observed. Through not observing a knowable object, mind is not observed [either]. Through not observing both, the dharmadhātu is observed." Thus, the goal of meditation is a totally unified mind that goes beyond all concepts and language to directly know the undifferentiated "uniformity of phenomena" (dharmasamatāḥ) and the thing-in-itself, the supreme reality. The elimination of all concepts applies even to the very idea of mind only or "mere-cognizance" itself. As the Dharmadharmatāvibhāga states: "through [referents] being observed in this way, they are observed as mere cognizance. By virtue of observing them as mere cognizance, Referents are not observed, and through not observing referents, mere cognizance is not observed [either]." This elimination of concepts and ideas is the basic framework applied by the bodhisattva to all meditative practices, including the different mindfulness meditations. The three samādhis (meditative absorptions) are likewise adapted into this new framework. These three are the emptiness (śūnyatā), wishlessness (apraṇihita), and imagelessness (ānimitta) samādhis.

=== Meditation ===
As the "school of yoga practitioners", meditative practice is discussed in various Yogācāra sources. The sixth chapter (the Maitreya Chapter) of the Saṃdhinirmocanasūtra focuses entirely on meditation. It extensively discusses the meditative aspects of ‘calm’ (śamatha) and ‘insight’ (vipaśyanā) from unique perspectives. Success in both of these is based on pure ethics and on pure views based on listening and reflecting (viśuddhaṃ śrutamayacintāmayadarśanam). Insight is paired with "objects consisting in images accompanied by reflection" (savikalpaṃ pratibimbaṃ) while tranquility is seen as based on objects consisting in images unaccompanied by reflection (nirvikalpaṃ pratibimbaṃ). Thus, insight meditation is based on the uninterrupted contemplation of mental images, while calming meditation is simply focusing on "the continuous flow of mind with uninterrupted attention". The Saṃdhinirmocana also states that the teachings themselves are an important object of meditative contemplation. This includes the Yogācāra teaching of consciousness-only, the teachings on the twofold emptiness (of self and phenomena), and the schematic analysis of the subject and its objects of consciousness.

While insight meditation is initially based on conceptual reflection, these are gradually abandoned at later stages until the yogin lets go of all concepts, teachings, and mental images. Furthermore, at the higher stages of meditation, the calm and insight meditations must ultimately be blended or yoked together (yuganaddha) in a single state of one-pointedness of mind (cittaikāgratā). This unified state is described as that state in which the yogin: "realises that these images (pratibimba) which are the domain of concentration (samādhigocara) are nothing but representation (vijñaptimātra), and having realised this, he contemplates (manasikaroti) Suchness (tathatā)."

== History ==
Yogācāra, along with Madhyamaka (Middle Way), is one of the two principal philosophical schools of Indian Mahāyāna Buddhism, though the related movement of Tathāgatagarbha-thought was also influential. (Note: Frauwallner, Die Philosophie des Buddhismus, treats Tathāgatagarbha-thought as a separate school of Mahayana, providing an excerpt from the Uttaratantra, written by a certain Sāramati (娑囉末底), c.q. Maitreya-nātha.)

=== Origin and early Yogācāra ===
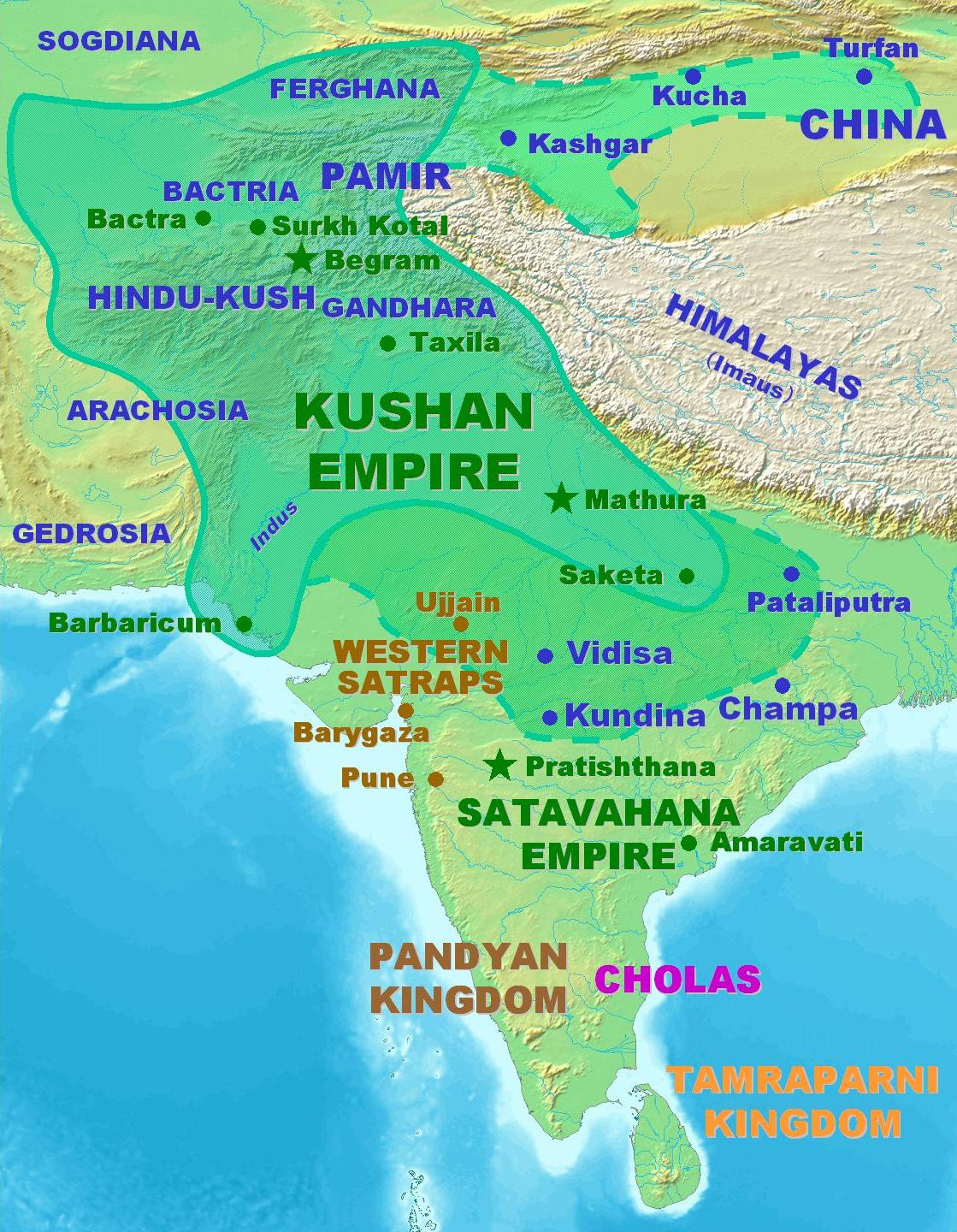
The Kushan Empire ruled much of north India during the early period of the Yogācāra school.

The term "yogācāra" (yoga practitioner) was originally used to refer to the Buddhist meditation adepts of the first centuries of the common era which were associated with the Sarvāstivāda and Sautrāntika traditions in north India (some of their key centers included Gandhara, Kashmir and Mathura). Modern scholars like Florin Deleanu have suggested that some yogis in this north Indian Buddhist milieu gradually adopted Mahāyāna ideas, eventually developing into a separate movement (a process which was complete by the 5th century). According to Deleanu, the Chinese Dhyana Sutras indicate just such a gradual adoption of Mahāyāna elements.

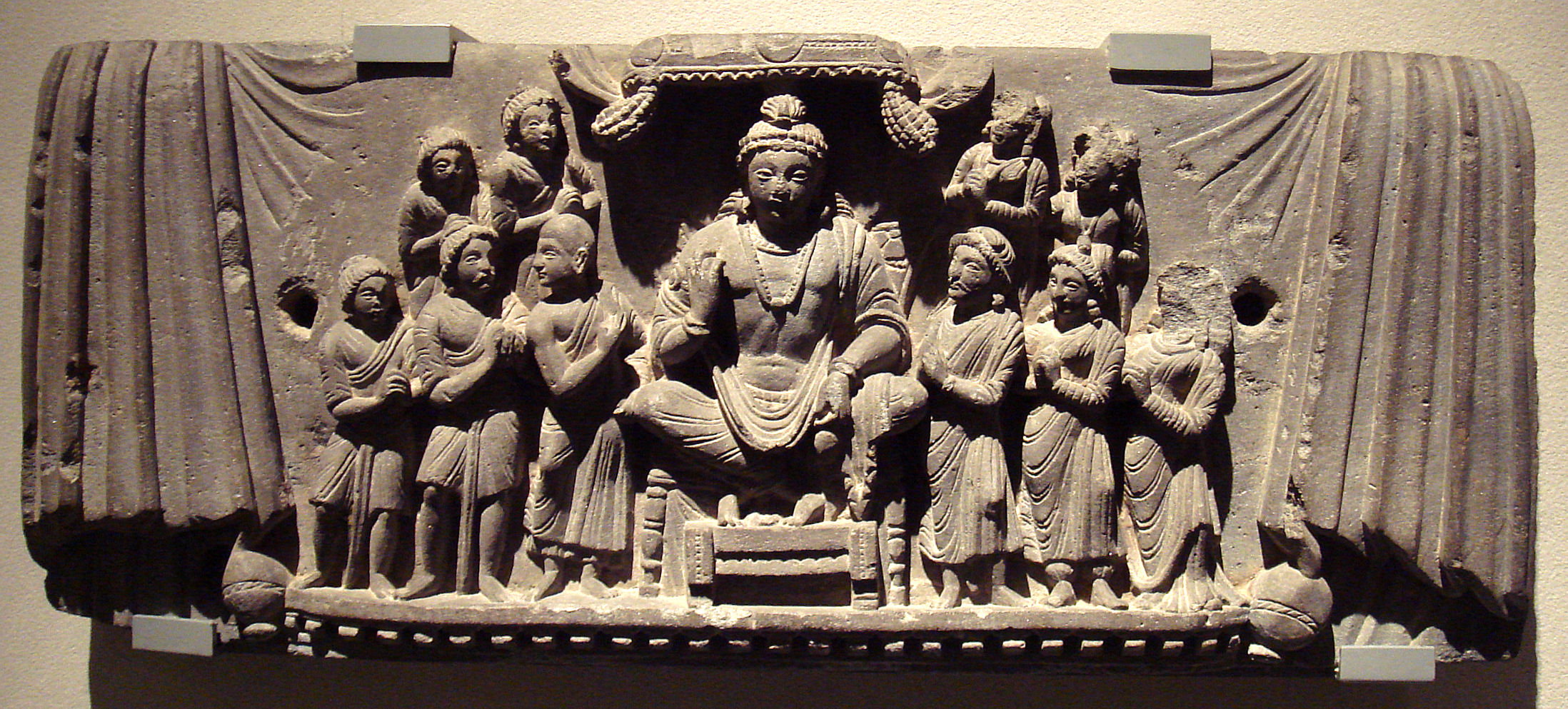
The bodhisattva Maitreya and disciples, a central figure in Yogacara origin myth. Gandhara, 3rd century CE.

One of the earliest texts of the Mahāyāna Yogācāra tradition proper is the Saṃdhinirmocana Sūtra (Unraveling the Profound Intent) which might be as early as the first or second century CE. It includes new theories such as the basis-consciousness (ālaya-vijñāna), the doctrine of vijñapti-mātra and the "three natures" (trisvabhāva). However, these theories were not completely new, as they have predecessors in older theories held by previous Buddhist schools, such as the Sautrāntika theory of seeds (bīja) and the Sthavira theory of the bhavanga. Philosophically speaking, Richard King notes that Sautrāntikas defended a kind of representationalism, in which the mind only perceives an image (akara) or representation (vijñapti) of an external object (never the object itself). Mahayana Yogācāras adopted a similar model but removed the need for any external object which acts as a cause for the image. As the doctrinal trailblazer of the Yogācāra, the Saṃdhinirmocana also introduced the paradigm of the Three Turnings of the Wheel of Dharma, with its own teachings being placed into the final and definitive teaching (which supersedes those of the Prajñaparamita sutras).

The early layers of the massive Yogācārabhūmi-śāstra (Treatise on the Stages of the Yogācāras) also contains very ancient Yogācāra material which is earlier than the Saṃdhinirmocana. However, in its current form it is a "conglomeration of heterogenous materials" (Schmithausen) which was finally compiled (perhaps by Asanga) after the Saṃdhinirmocana (hence, later layers quote the sutra directly). Modern scholars consider the Yogācārabhūmi to contain the work of several authors (mainly of a Mūlasarvāstivāda milieu), though it has traditionally been attributed in full to the bodhisattva Maitreya or to Asanga. It is influenced by Sarvāstivāda Abhidharma and Sautrāntika traditions, who also had similar texts called by the name "Yogācārabhūmi", such as the Yogācārabhūmi of Saṅgharakṣa.

=== Classical Yogācāra - Asaṅga and Vasubandhu ===
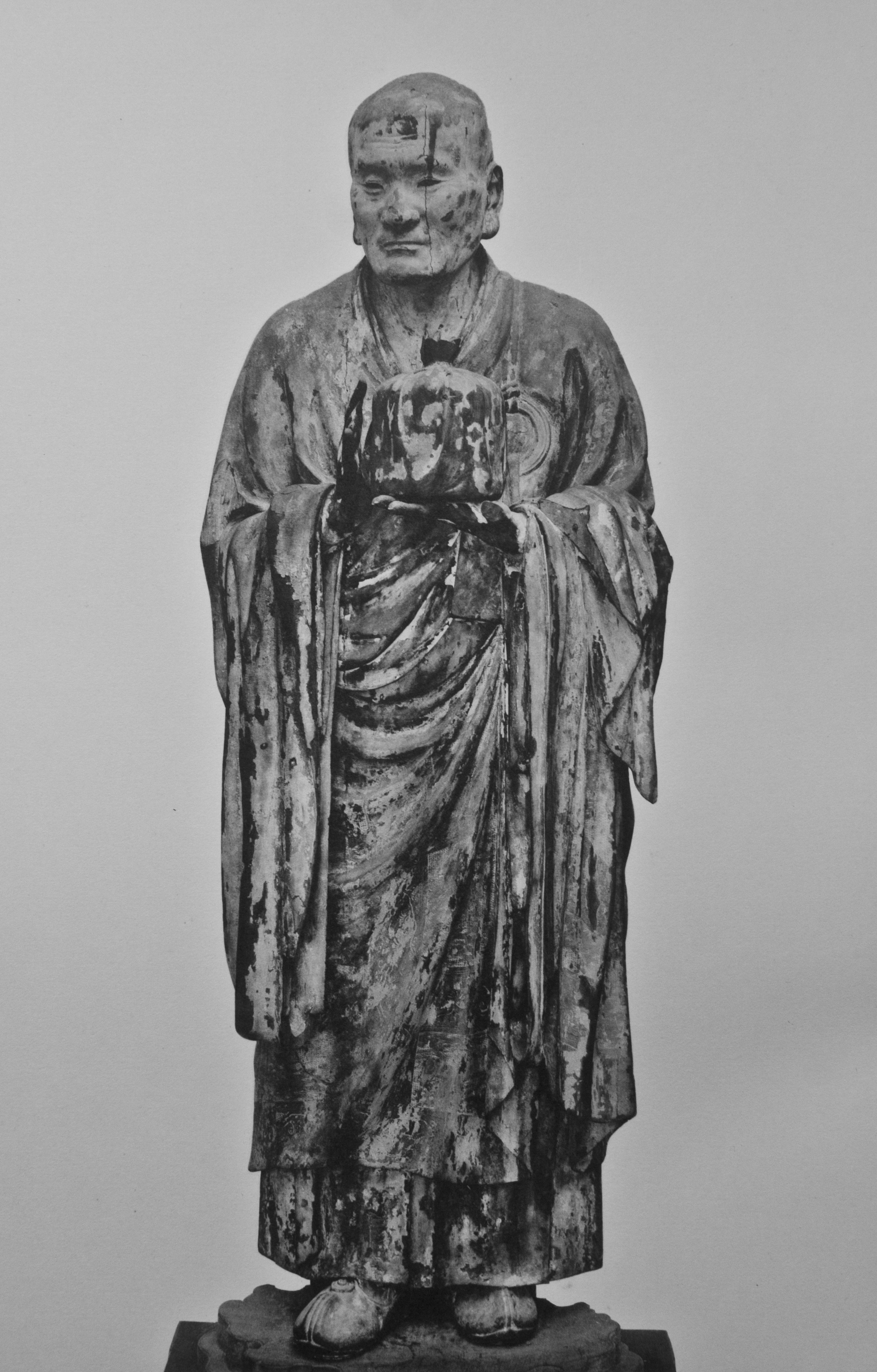
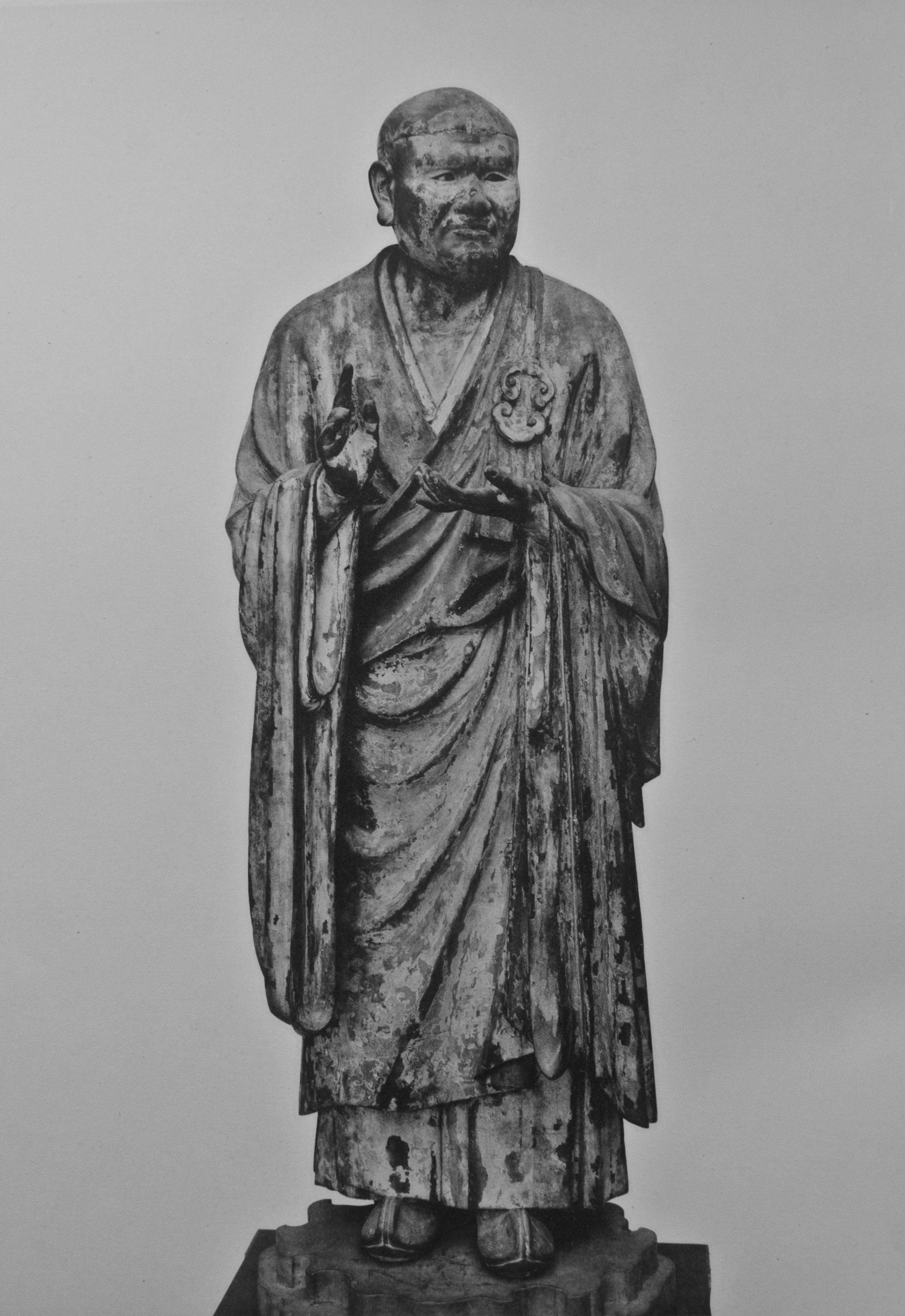
Asaṅga (left) and Vasubandhu statues at Kofuku-ji

Yogācāra's systematic exposition owes much to the brothers Asaṅga (4th c. CE) and Vasubandhu (c. 4th - 5th CE). Little is known of these figures, but traditional accounts (in authors like Xuanzang) state that Asaṅga received Yogācāra teachings from the bodhisattva and future Buddha, Maitreya. However, there are various discrepancies between the Chinese and Tibetan traditions concerning these so called "five works of Maitreya".

Modern scholars argue that the various works traditionally attributed to Maitreya are actually by other authors. According to Mario D'amato, the Mahāyānasūtrālamkāra and the Madhyāntavibhāga are part of a second phase of Yogācāra scholarship which took place after the completion of the Bodhisattvabhumi, but before the composition of Asanga's Mahāyānasaṃgraha (which quotes the Mahāyānasūtrālamkāra as an authoritative text). Regarding the Abhisamayalankara and the Ratnagotravibhaga, modern scholars generally see these as the works of different authors.

Asaṅga went on to write many of the key Yogācāra treatises such as the Mahāyānasaṃgraha and the Abhidharma-samuccaya. Asaṅga also went on to convert his brother Vasubandhu to Yogācāra. Vasubandhu was a top scholar of Vaibhāṣika and Sautrāntika Abhidharma thought, and the Abhidharmakośakārikā is his main work which discusses the doctrines of these traditions. Vasubandhu also went on to write important Yogācāra works like the Twenty Verses and the Thirty Verses on Consciousness-Only.

=== The middle period and the epistemological turn ===
The Yogācāra school held a prominent position in Indian Buddhism for centuries after the time of the two brothers. According to Lusthaus and Deleanu, after Asaṅga and Vasubandhu, two distinct "wings" of the school developed during the "Middle Period" of Yogācāra, the epistemological school and the scholastic school. Another important third movement developed a synthesis of Yogācāra with buddha-nature thought.

Thus, the three main branches of the Yogācāra movement which developed during the so called middle period are:

1. A logico-epistemic tradition (pramāṇavāda) focusing on issues of epistemology (Sanskrit: pramāṇa) and logic (hetuvidyā), exemplified by such thinkers as Dignāga, Dharmakīrti, Dharmottara, Devendrabuddhi, Prajñakaragupta, Jinendrabuddhi, Śākyabuddhi
2. A scholastic and exegetical tradition which refined and elaborated Yogācāra Abhidharma and wrote various commentaries, exemplified by such thinkers as Gunamati, Asvabhāva, Sthiramati, Jinaputra, Dharmapāla, Śīlabhadra, Xuanzang, and Vinītadeva (710-770).
3. The Yogācāra-tathāgatagarbha synthesis, found in the Laṅkāvatāra Sūtra, and Ghanavyūha sūtra, two treatises attributed to an author named Sāramati: the Ratnagotravibhāga, and Dharmadhātvaviśeṣaśāstra (Dasheng fajie wuchabie lun 大乘法界無差別論), as well as in the works of Paramārtha (499-569 CE), including his translations: Buddhagotraśāstra (Fó xìng lùn, 佛性論), and Anuttarâśrayasūtra.

These branches of Yogācāra thought were not mutually exclusive however, for example, Vinītadeva wrote pramāṇa works as well as commentaries on the works of Vasubandhu. Aside from these, there were also Yogācāra authors writing commentaries on the Prajñaparamita sutras, including the unknown author of the Abhisamayālaṅkāra (AA), Arya Vimuktisena (6th century) who commented on the AA, and Daṃṣṭrāsena (author of the Bṛhaṭṭīkā).

The doctrines of the exegetical tradition sometimes came under attack by other Buddhists, especially the notion of ālaya-vijñāna, which was seen as close to the Hindu ideas of ātman and prakṛti. It was perhaps due to this that the logical tradition shifted over time to using the term citta-santāna instead, since it was easier to defend a "stream" (santāna) of thoughts as a doctrine that did not contradict not-self. By the end of the eighth century, the scholastic tradition had mostly become eclipsed by the pramāṇa tradition as well as by a new hybrid school that "combined basic Yogācāra doctrines with Tathāgatagarbha thought."

The influential Pramāṇavāda tradition led by Dignāga and Dharmakīrti defined the main epistemological method for Indian Buddhism. Modern scholars see this school as having ushered in an "epistemological turn" for all Indian philosophy. The pramāṇa tradition continued to thrive in Magadha (especially at Nalanda) as well as in Kashmir well into the 11th century. One of the most important late figures of this tradition was Śaṅkaranandana (fl. c. 9th or 10th century), "the second Dharmakīrti".

=== Yogācāra-tathāgatagarbha synthesis ===
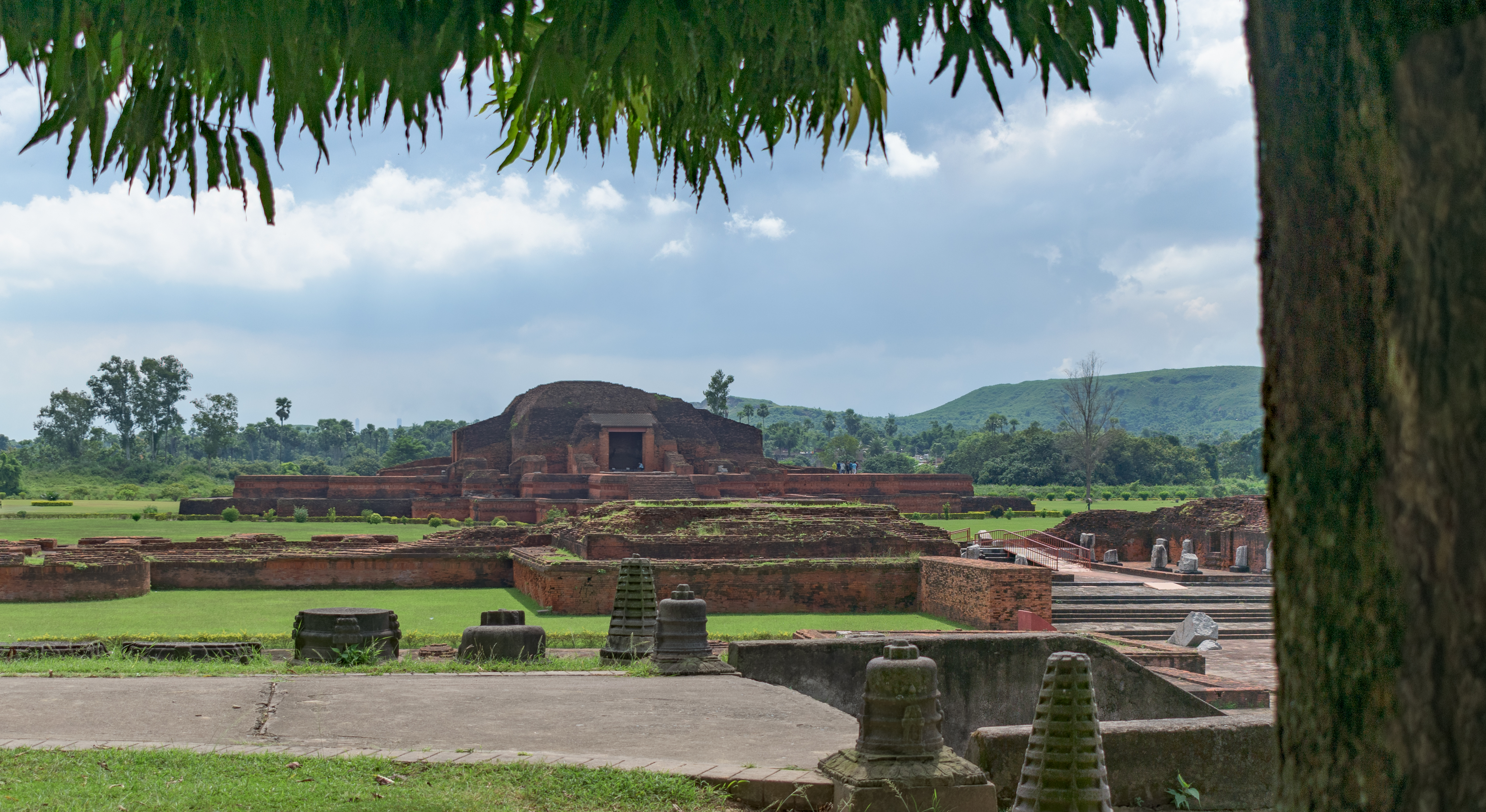
Panorama of the site of Vikramaśīla university (Bhagalpur district, Bihar). Vikramaśīla was an important center for late Indian Yogacara scholars, including the great panditas like Jñānaśrīmitra and Ratnākaraśānti.

According to Lusthaus, the synthetic Yogācāra-tathāgatagarbha school accepted the definition of tathāgatagarbha (the buddha-womb, buddha-source, or "buddha-within") as "permanent, pleasurable, self, and pure" (nitya, sukha, ātman, śuddha) which is found in various tathāgatagarbha sutras. This hybrid school eventually went on to link the tathāgatagarbha with the ālaya-vijñāna doctrine. Some key sources of this tendency are the Laṅkāvatāra Sūtra, Ratnagotravibhāga (Uttaratantra), and in China the Awakening of Faith.

The synthesis of Yogācāra and Tathāgatagarbha thought became extremely influential in both East Asia and Tibet. During the sixth and seventh centuries, various forms of competing Yogācāra systems were popular in Chinese Buddhism. The translator Bodhiruci (6th century CE) for example, took a more "classical" approach while Ratnamati was attracted to Tathāgatagarbha thought and sought to translate texts like the Dasabhumika commentary accordingly. Their disagreement on this issue led to the end of their collaboration as co-translators. The translator Paramārtha is another example of a hybrid thinker. He promoted the theory of a "stainless consciousness" (amala-vijñāna, a pure wisdom within all beings, i.e. the tathāgatagarbha), which is revealed once the ālaya-vijñāna is purified.

According to Lusthaus, Xuanzang's travels to India and his translation work was an attempt to return to a more "orthodox" and "authentic" Indian Yogācāra, and thus put to rest the debates and confusions in the Chinese Yogācāra of his time. The Cheng Weishi Lun returns to the use of the theory of seeds instead of the tathāgatagarbha to explain how some beings can reach Buddhahood. However, by the eighth century, the Yogācāra-tathāgatagarbha synthesis became the dominant interpretation of Yogācāra in East Asian Buddhism. Later Chinese thinkers like Fazang would thus criticize Xuanzang for failing to teach the tathāgatagarbha.

Karl Brunnhölzl notes that this syncretic tendency also existed in Indian Yogācāra scholasticism, but that it only became widespread during the later tantric era (when Vajrayana became prominent) with the work of thinkers like Jñānaśrīmitra, Ratnākaraśānti, and Maitripa. Kashmir also became an important center for this tradition, as can be seen in the works of Kashmiri Yogacarins Sajjana and Mahājana.

=== Yogācāra and Madhyamaka ===
Yogācāra and Madhyamaka philosophers demonstrated two opposing tendencies throughout the history of Buddhist philosophy in India: an antagonistic stance which saw both systems as rival and incompatible views, and another inclusive tendency which worked towards harmonizing their views. Some authors like the Madhyamikas Bhāviveka, Candrakīrti, and Śāntideva, and the Yogācārins Asanga, Dharmapāla, and Sthiramati, criticized the philosophical theories of the other tradition. While Indian Yogācārins criticized certain interpretations of Madhyamaka (which they term “those who misunderstand emptiness”), they never criticize the founders of Madhyamaka themselves (Nāgārjuna and Āryadeva), and saw their work as implicitly in agreement with Yogācāra. This inclusivism saw Nāgārjuna's teachings as needing further expansion and explication (since it was part of the "second turning" of the wheel of Dharma). Thus, Yogācāra thinkers affirmed the importance of Nāgārjuna's work and some even wrote commentaries on Nāgārjuna's Mūlamadhyamakakārika as a way to draw out the implicit meaning of Madhyamaka and show it was compatible with Yogācāra. These include Asanga's Treatise on Comforming to the Middle Way (Shun zhonglun 順中論) and Sthiramati's Mahayana Middle Way Commentary (Dasheng zhongguanshi lun 大乘中觀釋論 T.30.1567). Similarly, Vasubandhu and Dharmapāla both wrote commentaries on Āryadeva's Catuḥśātaka (Four Hundred Verses).

The harmonizing tendency can be seen in the work of philosophers like Kambala (5-6th century, author of the Ālokamālā), Jñānagarbha (8th century), his student Śāntarakṣita (8th century) and Ratnākaraśānti (c. 1000). Śāntarakṣita (8th century), whose view was later called "Yogācāra-Svatantrika-Madhyamaka" by the Tibetan tradition, saw the Mādhyamika position as ultimately true and at the same time saw the Yogācāra view as a useful way to relate to conventional truth (which leads one to the ultimate). Ratnākaraśānti on the other hand saw Nāgārjuna as agreeing with the intent of Yogācāra texts, while criticizing the interpretations of later Madhyamikas like Bhāviveka. Later Tibetan Buddhist thinkers like Shakya Chokden would also work to show the compatibility of the Alikākāravāda sub-school of Yogācāra with Madhyamaka, arguing that it is in fact a form of Madhyamaka. Likewise, the Seventh Karmapa Chödrak Gyamtso has a similar view which holds that the "profound important points and intents" of the two systems are one. Ju Mipham is also another Tibetan philosopher whose project is aimed at showing the harmony between Yogācāra and Madhyamaka, arguing that there is only a very subtle difference between them, being a subtle clinging by Yogācārins to the existence of an "inexpressible, naturally luminous cognition" (rig pa rang bzhin gyis ’od gsal ba).

In China, the Huayan patriarch and Chan master Zongmi (780–841) argued for the harmony of Madhyamaka and Yogācāra. According to Zongmi, while Nāgārjuna and Āryadeva of the Madhyamaka school eradicate grasping at existence, they nonetheless establish "true voidness," which is a voidness that does not go against existence. In the same vein, Zongmi maintained that while Asanga and Vasubandhu on the Yogācāra side eliminate grasping at voidness, they nonetheless establish "excellent existence," which is an existence that does not go against voidness. For Zongmi, although each side emphasizes either true voidness or excellent existence, they form a perfect whole. Zongmi also goes on to explain that the Mādhyamika Bhāvaviveka, by refuting truly existing characteristics, established true voidness, and thus "confirmed the excellent existence of origination by dependence;" while the Yogācārin Dharmapāla, by refuting a biased and annihilationist view of emptiness, confirmed excellent existence which is "identical to the no-self nature [asvabhāva] and true voidness." In this way, Zongmi argues that even though the texts of Bhāvaviveka and Dharmapāla refute each other, their intentions confirm each other. He says:

This is because there are two principles to excellent existence and true voidness. The first is the principle of mutual contradiction in the extreme. This means that they clash and are completely snatched up and eternally exhausted. The second is the principle of mutual agreement in the extreme. This means that they mysteriously fuse into one characteristic, and the whole substance is completely taken in. If they did not snatch each other up and completely exhaust each other, there would be no way for the whole substance to be completely drawn in. Thus, contradiction in the extreme is agreement in the extreme.

=== Yogācāra in East Asia ===
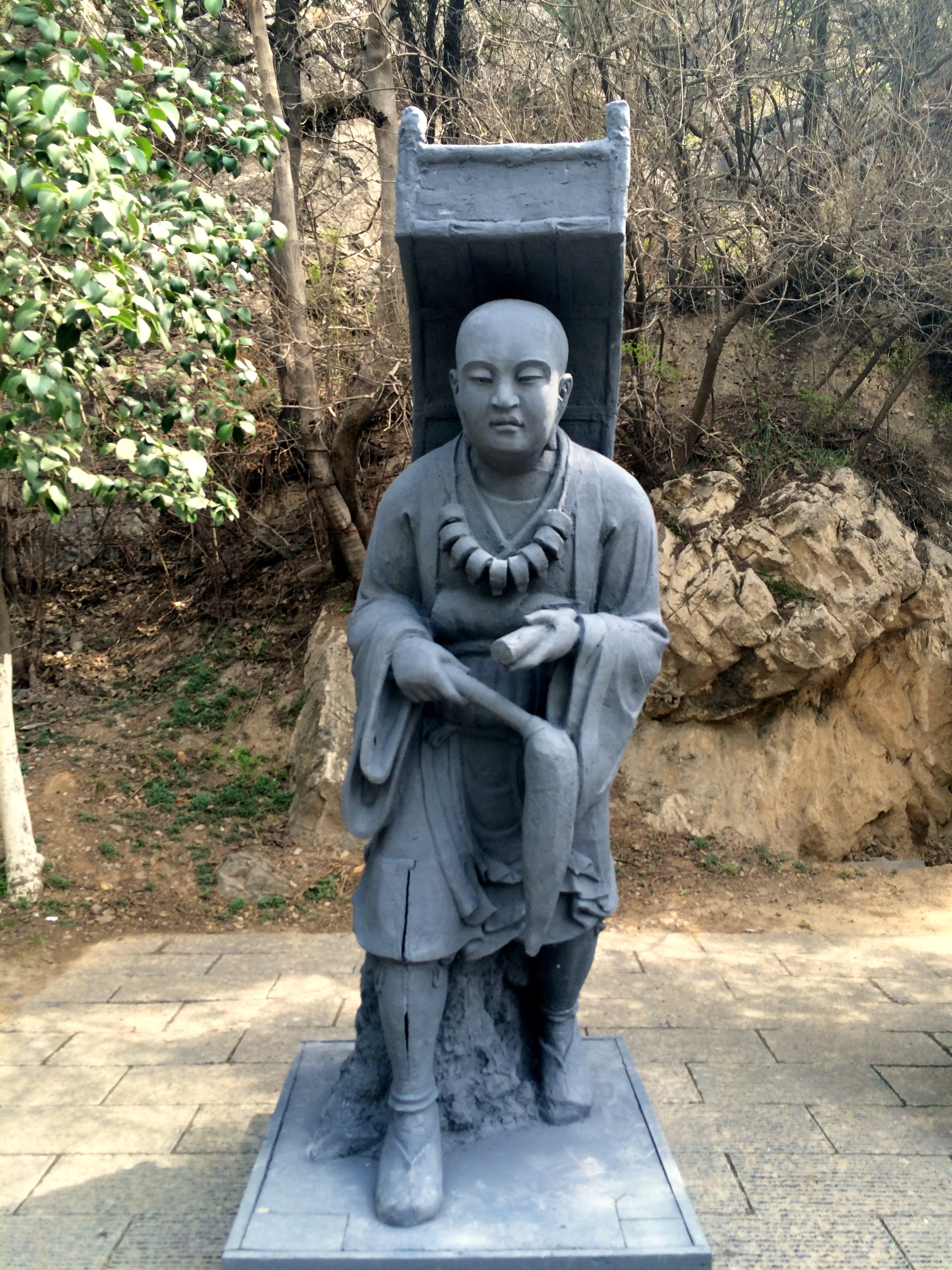
Statue of a traveling Xuanzang at Longmen Grottoes, Luoyang

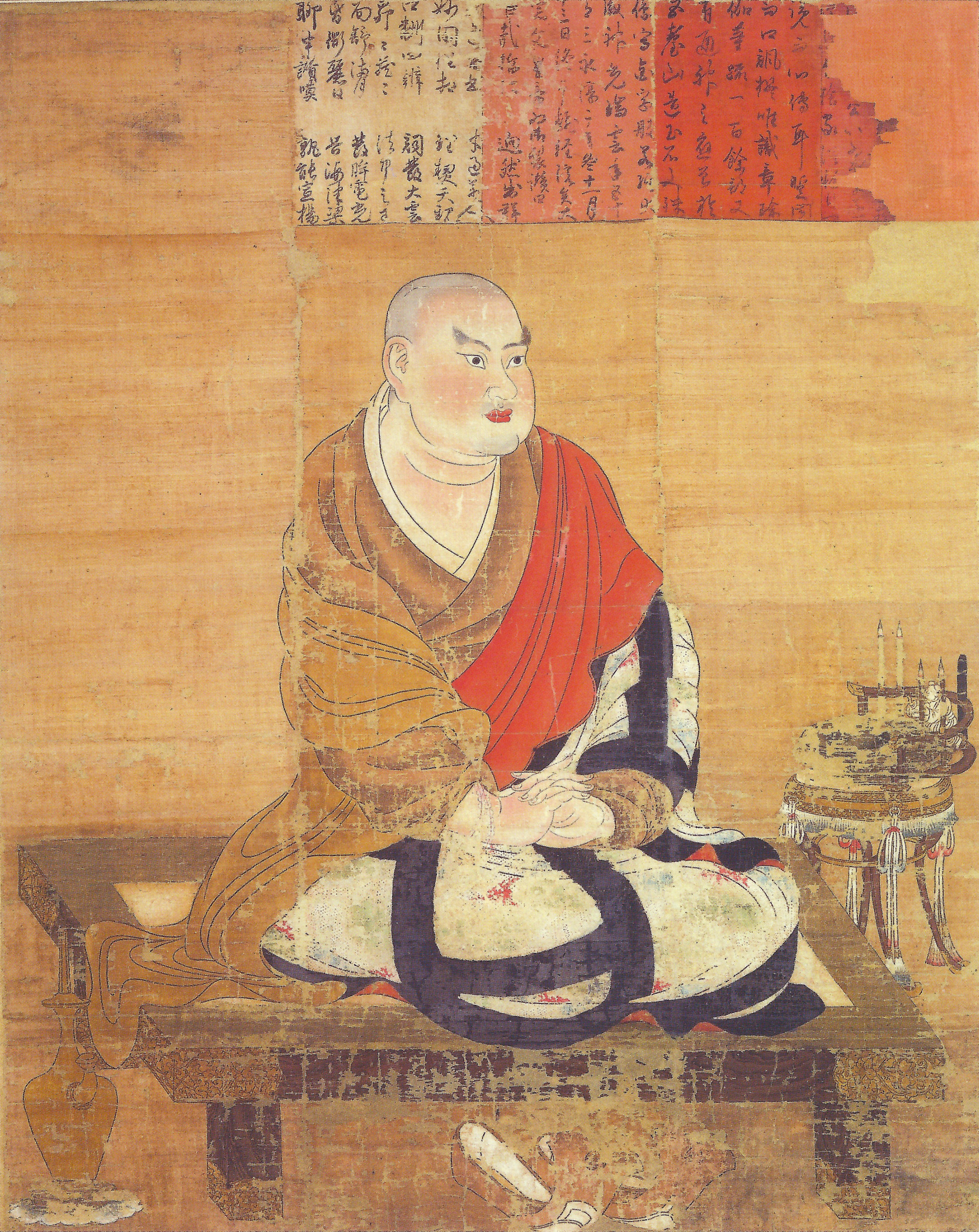
Kuījī (632–682), a student of Xuanzang

Translations of Indian Yogācāra texts were first introduced to China in the early 5th century CE. Among these was Guṇabhadra's translation of the Laṅkāvatāra Sūtra in four fascicles, which would also become important in the early history of Chan Buddhism. Influential 5th century figures include the translators Bodhiruci, Ratnamati, and Paramārtha. Their followers founded the Dilun (Daśabhūmikā Commentary) and Shelun (Mahāyānasaṃgraha) schools, both of which included Yogācāra and tathāgatagarbha elements. Modern scholars also hold that the Awakening of Faith, a very influential work in East Asian Buddhism, was written by a member of the Dilun tradition.

Xuanzang (fl. c. 602 – 664) is famous for having made a dangerous journey to India in order to study Buddhism, obtain more indic Yogācāra sources. Xuanzang spent over ten years in India traveling and studying under various Buddhist masters and drew on a variety of Indian sources in his studies. Upon his return to China, Xuanzang brought with him 657 Buddhist texts, including the Yogācārabhūmi and began the work of translating them. Xuanzang composed the Cheng Weishi Lun (Discourse on the Establishment of Consciousness Only) which drew on many Indian sources and commentaries and became a central work of East Asian Yogācāra.

Xuanzang's student Kuiji continued this tradition, writing several important commentaries. However, another student of Xuanzang, the Korean monk Wŏnch’ŭk, defended some of the doctrines of the Shelun school of Paramārtha, for which he was criticized by the followers of Kuiji. Wŏnch’ŭk's teachings were influential on the Yogācāra (Beopsang) of Silla Korea. Both of these competing Yogācāra sub-sects were then imported to Japan where they became the two sub-sects (the northern and southern temple lineages) of the Hossō school. Xuanzang's school later came under criticism from later Chinese masters like Fazang and it became less influential as the fortunes of other native Chinese schools rose. After Zhizhou, the fourth generation disciple of Xuanzang, no clear record of the Yogācāra lineage is available, and the tradition is considered to have become extinct soon after. Nevertheless, Yogācāra studies continued to be important at different times throughout Chinese history, including during the Five Dynasties through the synthesis of Yongming Yanshou, and the Ming Dynasty Revival of Yogācāra Studies, as well as the modern revival of Yogācāra in the 20th century.

=== Yogācāra in Tibet ===
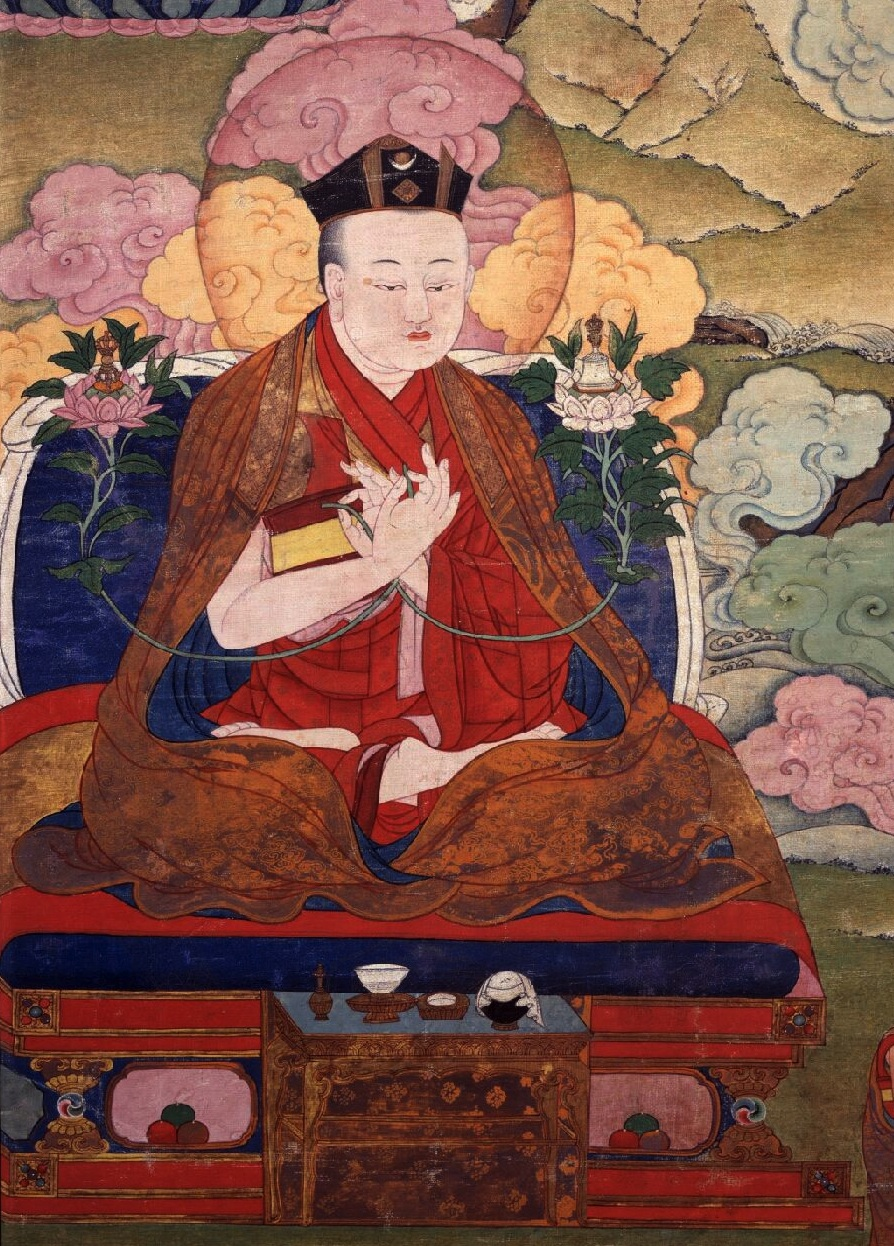
Rangjung Dorje, 3rd Karmapa Lama (1284–1339)

Yogācāra is studied in all schools of Tibetan Buddhism, though it receives different emphasis in each of these. Yogācāra thought is an integral part of the history of Tibetan Buddhism. It was first transmitted to Tibet by figures like Śāntarakṣita, Kamalaśīla and Atiśa.

The Tibetan Nyingma school and its Dzogchen teachings draw on both Madhyamaka and Yogācāra-Tathāgatagarbha thought. Similarly, Kagyu school figures like the Third Karmapa also rely on the Madhyamaka and Yogācāra-Tathāgatagarbha systems in their presentation of the ultimate view (termed Mahamudra in Kagyu). The Jonang school also developed its own synthetic philosophy which they termed shentong ("other-emptiness" Wylie: gzhan-stong), which also included elements from Yogācāra, Madhyamaka and Tathāgatagarbha. In contrast, the Gelug and Sakya schools generally see Yogācāra as a lesser view than the Madhyamaka philosophy of Candrakirti, which is seen as the definitive view in these traditions.

Today, Yogācāra topics remain important in Tibetan Buddhism and Yogācāra texts are widely studied. There are various debates and discussions among the Tibetan Buddhist schools regarding key Yogācāra ideas, like svasaṃvedana (reflexive awareness) and the foundational consciousness. Furthermore, the debates between the other-emptiness and self-emptiness views are also similar in some ways to the historical debates between Yogācāra-Tathāgatagarbha and Madhyamaka, though the specific viewpoints have evolved further and changed in complex ways. Modern thinkers continue to discuss Yogācāra issues, and attempt to synthesize it with Madhyamaka. For example, Ju Mipham, the 19th-century Rimé commentator, wrote a commentary on Śāntarakṣita's synthesis arguing that the ultimate intent of Madhyamaka and Yogācāra is the same.

=== Influence ===
Virtually all contemporary schools of Mahāyāna Buddhism are influenced by Yogācāra to some extent. This includes modern East Asian Buddhist traditions (like Zen and Pure Land) and Tibetan Buddhism. Zen was heavily influenced by Yogācāra sources, especially the Laṅkāvatāra Sūtra. In Tibetan Buddhism, Yogācāra sources are still widely studied and several are part of the monastic education curriculum in various traditions. Some influential Yogācāra texts in Tibetan Buddhism include: Asanga's Abhidharma-samuccaya, and the "Five Treatises of Maitreya" including the Mahayanasutralankara, and the Ratnagotravibhāga.

Hindu philosophers such as Vācaspati Miśra, Utpaladeva, Abhinavagupta, and Śrīharṣa were also influenced by Yogacara ideas and responded to their theories in their own works.

== Textual corpus ==
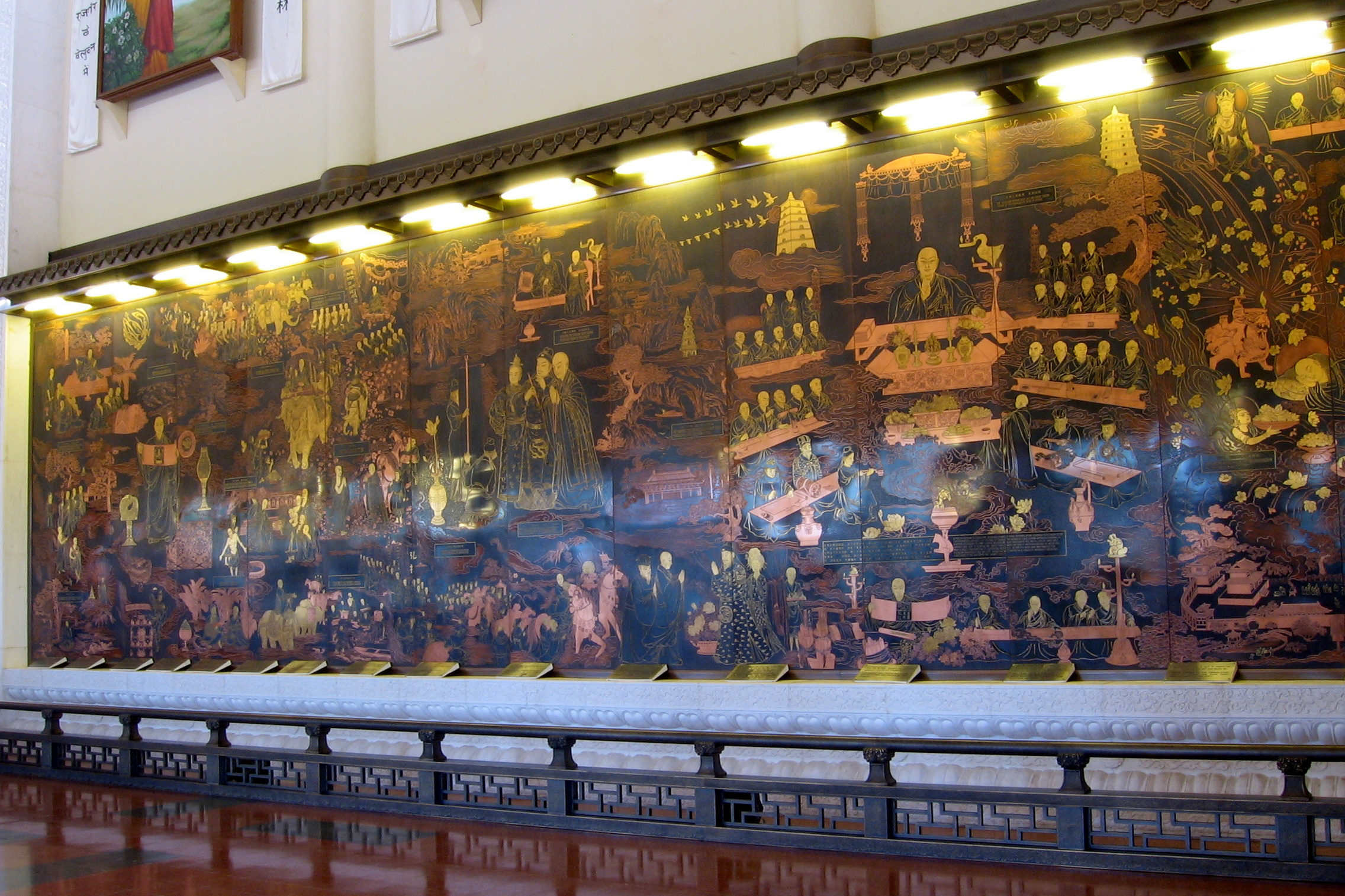
A wall painting depicting Xuanzang's travels and his translation work, Xuanzang Memorial Hall, modern Nalanda

=== Sūtras ===
The Saṃdhinirmocana Sūtra (Sūtra of the Explanation of the Profound Secrets; 2nd century CE), is a key early Yogācāra sutra which is considered to be the foundational sutra for the Yogācāra tradition. There are two Indian commentaries to this, one by Asanga and one by Jñanagarbha. The Avataṃsaka Sūtra (which includes the Daśabhūmikasūtra) also contains numerous teachings on mind-only and is very influential for East Asian Buddhism. Vasubandhu's Commentary on the Daśabhūmikasūtra is an important commentary to this. Another text, the Mahāyānābhidharmasūtra is often quoted in Yogācāra works and is assumed to also be an early Yogācāra sutra.

The Laṅkāvatāra Sūtra also later assumed considerable importance in East Asia, and portions of this text were considered by Étienne Lamotte as being contemporaneous with the Saṃdhinirmocana. This text equates the Yogācāra theory of ālayavijñāna with the tathāgatagarbha (buddha-nature) and thus seems to be part of the tradition which sought to merge Yogācāra with tathāgatagarbha thought. Another sutra which contains similar themes to the Laṅkāvatāra is the Ghanavyūha Sūtra.

All these five sutras are listed by Kuiji as key sutras for the Yogācāra school in his Commentary on the Cheng weishi lun (成唯識 論述記; Taishō no. 1830). Another lesser known sutra which was important in East Asian Yogācāra is the Buddha Land Sutra (Buddhabhūmi Sūtra; Taishō vol. 16, no. 680) which along with its commentaries, teaches that the pure land is not a physical place, but a symbol for wisdom. This sutra was important enough in India to have at least two Indian Yogācāra commentaries written on it, Śīlabhadra's Buddhabhūmi-vyākhyāna and Bandhuprabha's Buddhabhūmyupadeśa.

There are also various Indian, Chinese and Tibetan commentaries to these various Mahayana sutras. Furthermore, the Prajñaparamita sutras are also important sources in Yogācāra, even though most do not cover specifically "Yogācāra" doctrines. This is shown by the fact that various Yogācāra commentaries were written on Prajñaparamita sutras, including commentaries by Asanga (Vajracchedikākāvyākhyā), Vasubandhu, Dignāga, Daṃṣṭrasena (Bṛhaṭṭīkā), Ratnākaraśānti (various), and the Abhisamayālaṅkāra.

=== Treatises ===
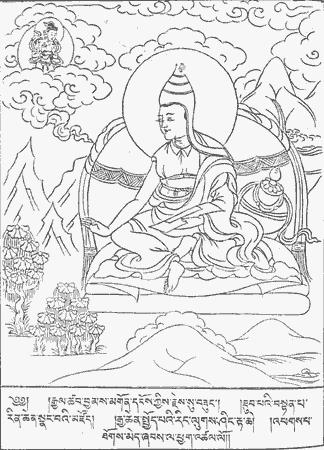
Tibetan depiction of Asaṅga receiving teachings from the bodhisattva Maitreya. This is one of the founding religious myth of Yogācāra scholasticism.

Yogācāra authors wrote numerous scholastic and philosophical treatises (śāstra) and commentaries (ṭīkā, bhāṣya, vyākhyāna, etc). The following is a list in historical order and only includes specifically Yogācāra-Vijñānavāda figures and works:

- Yogācārabhūmi-śāstra, the earliest Yogācāra treatise, a massive encyclopedic work on Yogācāra theory and praxis which is a composite work reflecting various stages of historical development (compiled 3rd to 5th century CE).
- Mahāyānasūtrālamkāra and its bhāṣya, traditionally attributed to the bodhisattva Maitreya or Asanga, modern scholars like D'amato place this text (together with the commentary) after the Bodhisattvabhumi, but before Asanga.
- Madhyāntavibhāga (Distinguishing the Middle and the Extremes), another work of the "second phase" of post-Yogācārabhūmi Yogācāra thought, traditionally attributed to the bodhisattva Maitreya who is said to have revealed it to Asanga.
- Dharmadharmatāvibhāga (Distinguishing Dharmas and Dharmata), another work of the so called "Maitreya corpus"
- Nāgamitra's (3rd-4th century?) Kāyatrayāvatāramukha (a treatise on the trikaya and the three natures)
- The works of Asaṅga (4th-5th century CE): the Mahāyānasaṃgraha and the Abhidharma-samuccaya.
- Vasubandhu's (4th-5th century CE) Viṃśaṭikā-kārikā (Treatise in Twenty Stanzas), Triṃśikā-kārikā (Treatise in Thirty Stanzas), Vyākhyāyukti ("Proper Mode of Exposition"), Karmasiddhiprakarana ("A Treatise on Karma"), and Pañcaskandhaprakaraṇa (Explanation of the Five Aggregates).
- Ālokamālāprakaraṇanāma (An Explanation named 'Garland of Light') by Kambala (c. fifth to sixth century) which attempts to harmonize Madhyamaka and Yogācāra, mostly by assimilating Madhyamaka under Yogācāra.
- The Saṃdhinirmocanasūtravyākhyāna is a commentary to the Saṃdhinirmocanasūtra attributed to Asanga, but this has been questioned by modern scholars.
- Abhisamayālaṅkāra (Ornament of Realization), a commentary on the Prajñaparamita sutras. It is attributed to Maitreya-Asanga by Tibetan tradition, but it is unknown in Chinese sources. Modern scholars see this as a post-Asanga text. Makransky attributes it to Ārya Vimuktisena, the first commentator on this text.
- Dignāga's Ālambanaparīkṣā and its vrtti (commentary) defend the view of consciousness-only using epistemological arguments
- The Indian Paramārtha (499–569) translated many works to Chinese, and also wrote some original treatises and commentaries, possibly including the Buddhagotraśāstra (Fo Xing Lun)
- Sthiramati (6th century), wrote numerous commentaries like Pañcaskandhakavibhāṣā and Triṃśikāvijñaptibhāṣya
- Mahayana Awakening of Faith (author unknown)
- Dharmapala of Nalanda (6th century), wrote commentaries to the Ālambanaparīkṣā and Āryadeva's Catuḥśataka
- Asvabhāva, wrote Mahāyānasūtrālaṃkāra-ṭīkā, Mahāyānasaṃgrahopanibandhana and a commentary on Ālokamālā
- Dharmakīrti's (6th or 7th century) Pramānaṿārttika (Commentary on Epistemology), is mostly a work on pramana, but it also argues for consciousness-only
- Śīlabhadra (529–645) - Buddhabhūmivyākhyāna
- Xuanzang's (602-664) Cheng Wei Shi Lun is a large Chinese commentary on the Triṃśikā which draws on numerous Indian sources
- Kuiji (632–682) - Various commentaries on texts like Cheng weishi lun, Heart-sutra, Madhyāntavibhāga etc.
- Wŏnch'ŭk (613–696) - Commentaries on the Samdhinirmocanasutra, Heart-sutra, and Benevolent King Sutra
- Wŏnhyo (617–686) - wrote commentaries on various works such as the Madhyāntavibhāga
- Guṇaprabha - Bodhisattvabhūmiśīlaparivarta-bhāṣya
- Jinaputra, wrote a commentary to the Abhidharmasamucchaya
- Candragomī (sixth/seventh century) - Śiṣyalekha, Bodhisattvasaṃvaraviṃsaka
- Vinītadeva (c. 645–715) - wrote commentaries on Viṃśatikā, Triṃśika and Ālambanaparīkśā
- Jñānacandra (eighth century) - Yogacaryābhāvanātātparyārthanirdeśa, a meditation manual
- Sāgaramegha (eighth century) - Yogācārabhūmaubodhisattvabhūmivyākhyā, a large Yogācārabhūmi commentary
- Sumatiśīla (late eighth century) wrote a commentary on Vasubandhu's Karmasiddhiprakaraṇa
- Prajñakaragupta (8th-9th century) - Pramāṇavārttikālaṃkāra and Sahāvalambanirṇayasiddhi, a proof of idealism
- Śaṅkaranandana (fl. c. 9th or 10th century) - Prajñālaṅkāra (Ornament of Wisdom), an exposition of vijñaptimātratā
- Dharmakīrti of Sumatra - Durbodhālokā (Light on the Hard-to-Illuminate), a sub-commentary to the Abhisamayālaṃkāra-śāstra-vṛtti of Haribhadra.
- Jñānaśrīmitra (fl. 975-1025 C.E.) - Sākarasiddhi, Sākarasaṃgraha, and Sarvajñāsiddhi
- Ratnakīrti (11th century CE) - Ratnakīrtinibandhāvalī and Sarvajñāsiddhi
- Ratnākāraśānti (10-11th century) - Prajñāpāramitopadeśa, Madhyamakālaṃkāropadeśa, Vijñaptimātratāsiddhi, Triyānavyavasthāna, Madhyamakālaṃkāravṛtti-Madhyamapratipadāsiddhi
- Jñānaśrībhadra - commentaries on Laṅkāvatārasūtra, Mahāyānasūtrālaṃkāra, and Pramāṇavārttika
- Sajjana (11th century) - Putralekha, Mahāyānottaratantraśāstropadeśa and Sūtrālaṃkārapiṇḍārtha
- Jōkei (1155–1213) - Gumei hosshin shū (Anthology of Awakenings from Delusion)
- Ryōhen (1194–1252) - Kanjin kakumushō (Précis on Contemplating the Mind and Awakening from the Dream)

==== Criticisms ====
Thinkers from the ancient Indian realist schools, such as the Mimamsa, Vishishtadvaita, Dvaita, Nyaya, Yoga, Samkhya, Sauntrantika, Jain, Vaisesika, and others heavily criticized Yogacara, and composed refutations of the Yogacara position.

Sankara, founder of the Advaita school, which holds a form of idealism, also was harshly critical of Yogacara.

== See also ==
- Madhyamaka
- Mahayana
- Idealism
- Vedanta
- Kashmir Shaivism
- School of the Heart-Mind
- Mimamsa
- Chandrakirti

== Sources ==
- Bayer, Achim (2012). Addenda and Corrigenda to The Theory of Karman in the Abhidharmasamuccaya, 2012 Hamburg: Zentrum für Buddhismuskunde.
- Kalupahana, David J. (1992), The Principles of Buddhist Psychology, Delhi: ri Satguru Publications
- Keenan, John P. (1993). Yogācarā. pp. 203–212 published in Yoshinori, Takeuchi; with Van Bragt, Jan; Heisig, James W.; O'Leary, Joseph S.; Swanson, Paul L.(1993). Buddhist Spirituality: Indian, Southeast Asian, Tibetan, and Early Chinese. New York City: The Crossroad Publishing Company. ISBN 0-8245-1277-4
- King, Richard (1998). "Vijnaptimatrata and the Abhidharma context of early Yogacara". Asian Philosophy. 8 (1): 5–18. doi:10.1080/09552369808575468.
- Kochumuttom, Thomas A. (1999), A buddhist Doctrine of Experience. A New Translation and Interpretation of the Works of Vasubandhu the Yogacarin, Delhi: Motilal Banarsidass
- Norbu, Namkhai (2001), The Precious Vase: Instructions on the Base of Santi Maha Sangha. Shang Shung Edizioni. Second revised edition. (Translated from the Tibetan, edited and annotated by Adriano Clemente with the help of the author. Translated from Italian into English by Andy Lukianowicz.)
- Park, Sung-bae (1983), Buddhist Faith and Sudden Enlightenment, SUNY Press
- Shantarakshita & Ju Mipham (2005). The Adornment of the Middle Way Padmakara Translation of Ju Mipham's commentary on Shantarakshita's root versus on his synthesis.
- Sponberg, Alan (1979). Dynamic Liberation in Yogacara Buddhism Archived 2014-02-03 at the Wayback Machine, Journal of the International Association of Buddhist Studies 2(1), pp. 44–64.
- Stcherbatsky, Theodore (1936). Mathyanta-Vibhanga, "Discourse on Discrimination between Middle and Extremes" ascribed to Bodhisattva Maiteya and commented by Vasubhandu and Sthiramathi, translated from the sanscrit, Academy of Sciences USSR Press, Moscow/Leningrad.
- Timme Kragh, Ulrich (editor) 2013, The Foundation for Yoga Practitioners: The Buddhist Yogācārabhūmi Treatise and Its Adaptation in India, East Asia, and Tibet, Volume 1 Harvard University, Department of South Asian studies.
- Zim, Robert (1995). Basic ideas of Yogacara Buddhism. San Francisco State University. Source: Archived 2012-09-11 at the Wayback Machine (accessed: October 18, 2007).
