= Viṃśatikā-vijñaptimātratāsiddhi =

The Viṃśatikā Vijñaptimātratāsiddhiḥ (Twenty Verses on Representation Only) is an important work in Buddhism. The work was composed by Vasubandhu (fl. 4th century) and is notable within the discourse of Yogacara and has influenced subsequent Buddhadharma discourse of other schools.

Anacker (1984: p. 159) in making reference to the works of Dharmapala and Xuanzang, holds that:

Perhaps no work of Vasubandhu's has been more consistently misunderstood than The Twenty Verses. It has frequently been used as an authoritative source for opinions that are in fact not even there. The main point here is not that consciousness unilaterally creates all forms in the [U]niverse, as has been supposed by Dharmapala and [Xuanzang], but rather that an object-of-consciousness is "internal", and the "external" stimuli are only inferrable. What is observed directly are always only perceptions, colored by particular consciousness- "seeds". The very fact that these "seeds" are spoken of at all indicates a double influence. On one hand, every consciousness-moment deposits a "seed": on the other, each "seed" influences every subsequent consciousness-moment, until a "revolution at the basis" of consciousness is achieved.

Dan Lusthaus (undated: unpaginated) holds that:

Vasubandhu's most original and philosophically interesting treatise is his Twenty Verses (Vimśatikā). In it he defends Yogācāra from objections by Realists. Yogācāra claims that what we think are external objects are nothing more than mental projections. This has been mistaken for an Idealist position because interpreters focus on the word "object" instead of "external". Vasubandhu does not deny that cognitive objects (viṣaya, ālambana, etc.) exist; what he denies is that they appear anywhere else than in the very act of consciousness which apprehends them. He denies that such cognitive objects have external referents (bahya-artha). What Vasubandhu means is that cognition never takes place anywhere except in consciousness. Everything we know we have acquired through sensory experience (in Buddhism the mind is considered a special type of sense). We are fooled by consciousness into believing that those things which we perceive and appropriate within consciousness are actually outside our cognitive sphere. Put another way, we mistake our interpretations of things for the things themselves. Consciousness is driven by karmic intentionalities (the habitual tendencies produced by past actions), and how we perceive is shaped by that conditioning. The goal of Yogācāra is to break out of this cognitive narcissism and finally wake up to things as they are, devoid of erroneous conceptual projections.

Tola and Dragonetti (2004, p. 134), in contrast, assert that:

Vasubandhu states in first place...: All is only mind, consciousness; there exist only representations, mental creations, to which no external object corresponds.

They base their claim on their translation from Vasubandhu's autocommentary to the Twenty Verses, which opens with the statement

In the Mahayana, the three worlds are established to be only consciousness, according to the sutra that affirms: "O sons of the Victorious, the three worlds are only mind (citta)." ... [The word] "only" is [used] with the purpose of denying (the existence of external) things.
