= Alex Wayman =

Alex Wayman (January 11, 1921 – September 22, 2004) was an American tibetologist and indologist and worked as a professor of Sanskrit at Columbia University. He was of Jewish background.

After finishing his B.A. (1948), M.A. (1949) and Ph. D. (1959) at the University of California, Los Angeles he came to Columbia as a visiting professor in 1966. In 1967 he was made professor of Sanskrit and remained in this position until his retirement in 1991.

Wayman wrote many books on Buddhism, especially Tantric Buddhist themes, and on Buddhist logic.

== Books ==
- Analysis of the Śrāvakabhūmi Manuscript, 1969, University of California Press.
- Buddhist Insight, 1984, Motilal Banarsidass.
- The Enlightenment of Vairocana, 1992, Motilal Banarsidass.
- Untying the Knots in Buddhism, 1997, Motial Banarsidass.
- Introduction to Buddhist Tantric Systems, 1998, Motilal Banarsidass.
- A Millennium of Buddhist Logic, 1999, Motilal Banarsidass.

=== Honorary Volume ===
- Researches in Indian and Buddhist philosophy: Essays in honour of Professor Alex Wayman, 1993, Motilal Banarsidass.
