= Trisvabhāva =

Doctrine of the Yogācāra school of Buddhism

Trisvabhāva (Sanskrit; Chinese: 三性 or 三自性) or the three natures, is one of the key doctrines of the Yogācāra school of Buddhism. The concept of the three natures describes the three qualities that all phenomena possess, and can be found in several Mahayana sutras, such as Samdhinirmocana Sūtra. The three natures are: Parikalpita-svabhāva (the imaginary nature of things), Paratantra-svabhāva (the dependent nature of things) and Pariniṣpanna-svabhāva (the consummate or perfected nature of things).

== Meaning and interpretations ==
Parikalpita (Sanskrit; Traditional Chinese: 遍計所執性): the "impure" or "imaginary" nature refers to the falsely perceived nature of objects as entities that exists separate from the consciousness that perceives them. Note that in the Yogācāra analysis, objects do not exist separately from the perceiving subject, they come into existence in dependence upon consciousness, which in turn are produced from seeds that reside in the eighth consciousness, or Alayavijnana. However, due to ignorance, subject and object are imagined to be separate from each other.

Paratantra (Sanskrit; Traditional Chinese: 依他起性): the dependent nature of things refers to the conventional truth that all objects and subjects rely on causes and conditions for their existence (dependent origination). In other words, no impermanent phenomenon can produce itself.

Pariniṣpanna (Sanskrit; Traditional Chinese: 圓成實性): the consummate nature refers to the nonduality between the consciousnesses and their objects. Specifically, it refers to an absence of an object that is separate from the consciousness that perceives it. It can be understood as the perfected character of reality.

== See also ==
- Yogācāra
- Faxiang
- Asatkalpa
- Cheng Weishi Lun
- Samdhinirmocana Sūtra
- Mahāyānasaṃgraha
