= Chitsū =

Priest of the Hosso School

Chitsū (智通) was a priest of the Hosso School of Japanese Buddhism.

== Exegesis ==
The Soka Gakkai Dictionary of Buddhism (2002) in mentioning Chitatsu, Hsyan-tsang, Tz'u-en, Dosho, Yamato Province, states that Chitsū was:

A priest of the Dharma Characteristics (Hosso) school in Japan. In 658, together with Chitatsu, he went to China and studied the doctrine of the Dharma Characteristics school under Hsyan-tsang and his disciple Tz'u-en. They brought the doctrine back to Japan. This is known as the second transmission of the doctrine to Japan, following that of Dosho, who went to China in 653 and studied under Hsyan-tsang. Chitsubuilt Kannon-ji temple in Yamato Province to spread the Dharma Characteristics doctrine. In 672 he was appointed administrator of priests.

== See also ==
- Yogacara
