= Woncheuk =

Korean Buddhist monk (613–696)

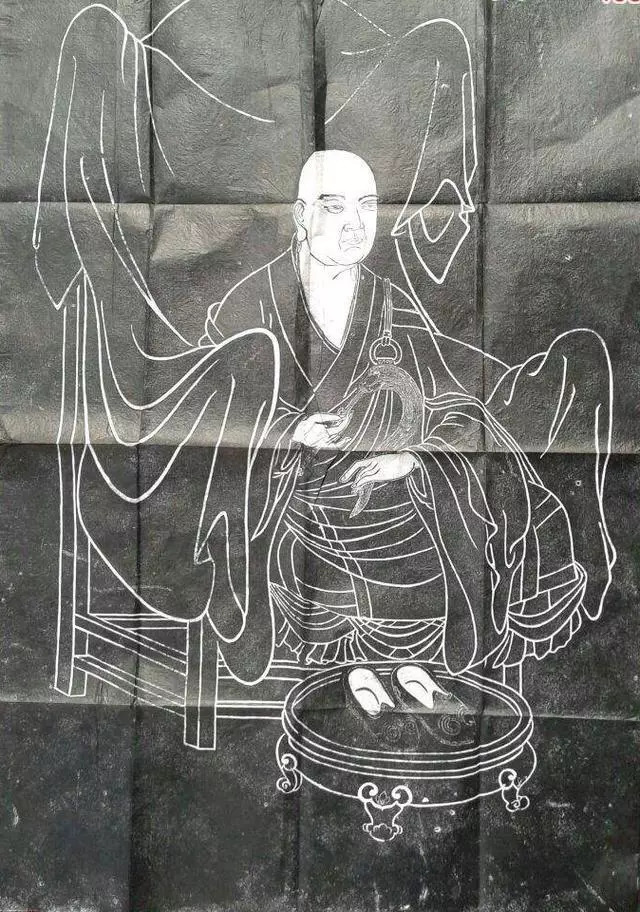

Korean name
- Hangul: 원측
- Hanja: 圓測
- RR: Woncheuk
- MR: Wŏnch'ŭk

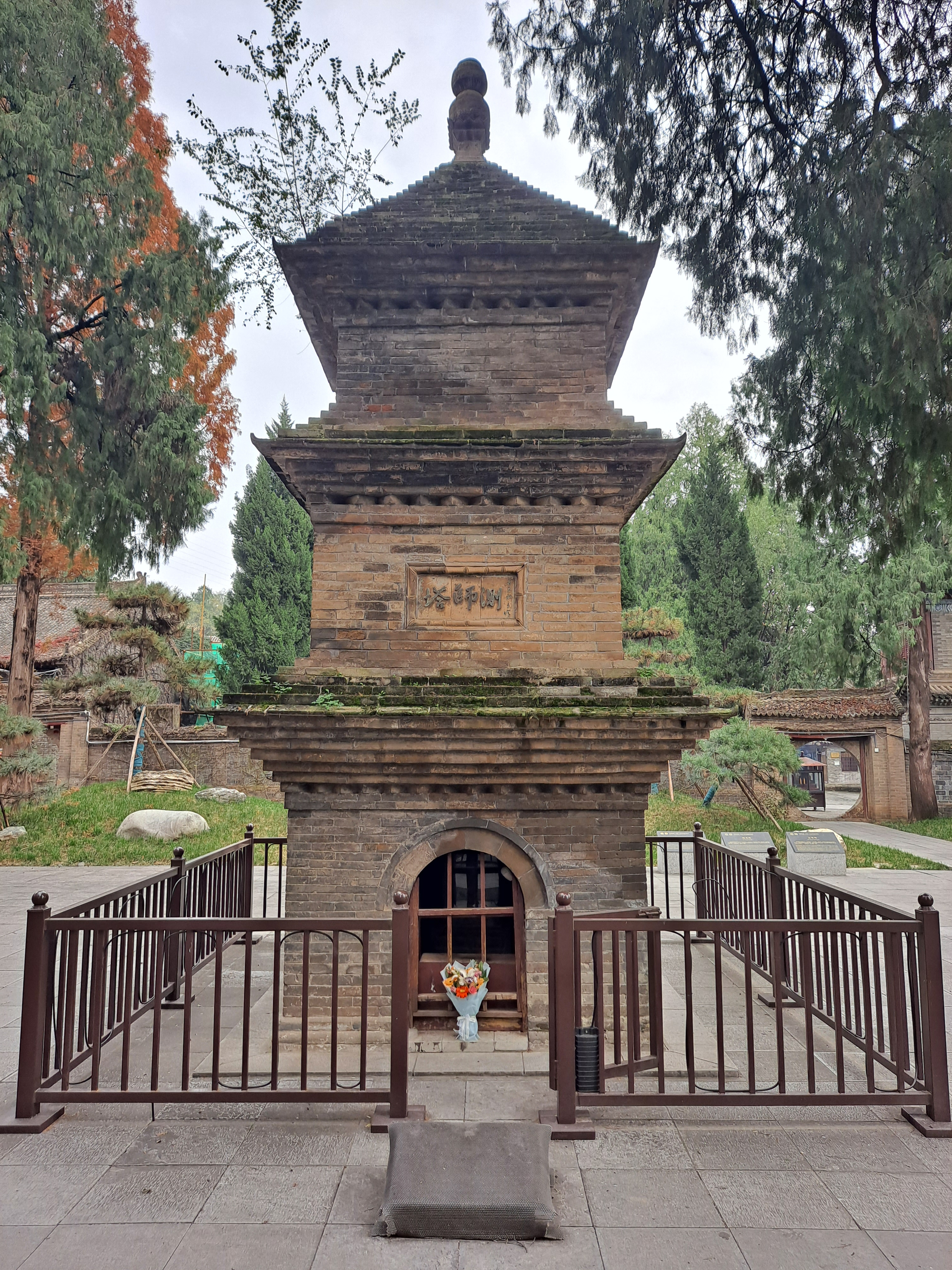
Woncheuk Pagoda in Xingjiao Temple, Xi'an

Woncheuk (Korean: 원측; MR: Wŏnch'ŭk, c. 613–696) was a Korean Buddhist monk who worked in seventh century China. Woncheuk was a follower of Paramārtha (499–569) and the Shelun school of Yogacara. This school defended the view that there was a ninth consciousness called the "pure consciousness" (amalavijñāna), as opposed to just the eight consciousnesses of classical Yogacara. This position had been rejected by Xuanzang and Kuiji. Woncheuk later became a student of Xuanzang (c. 600–664) and worked in his translation team. Woncheuk's works attempt to reconcile the two traditions of East Asian Yogacara and often diverges from the interpretations of Xuanzang and Kuiji in favor of the views of Paramārtha.

Woncheuk's work was revered throughout China and Korea, even reaching Chinese rulers like Emperors Taizong, Gaozong of Tang and Empress Wu of Zhou. Woncheuk's exegetical work also influenced Tibetan Buddhism and the greater Himalayan region.

== Biography ==
Woncheuk was born Kim Mun-a (Korean: 김문아; Hanja: 金文雅) in Silla and was a member of the state's royal family. The Zhengzhang Shangfang reconstruction of the Middle Chinese pronunciation of his name is 圓測 /ɦˠiuᴇnťʃʰɨk̚/. Woncheuk (pinyin: Yuáncè) was also known as Chinese: 西明法師; pinyin: Xīmíng Fǎshī, which is a namesake attributed to the temple of the same name where he did his exegesis.

Woncheuk was initially a follower of Paramārtha's (499–569) Shelun school (攝論宗) and later lived at Xi Ming Temple as a student of Xuanzang. The Shelun school was known for its synthesis of Yogacara teachings with tathāgatagarbha thought and for its doctrine of a pure consciousness (amalavijñāna). Woncheuk wrote various works on Mahayana Buddhism. His interpretations of Yogacara often differ from that of the school of Xuanzang and his student Kuiji and instead promotes ideas closer to those of the Shelun school. Due to this, his work was criticized by the Faxiang school of the disciples of Kuiji.

Woncheuk's work contributed to the development of Chinese Buddhist thought. He influenced the development of the theories of Essence-Function and the Ekayāna (One Vehicle). His work was also influential on the development of the Huayan school. While in Tang China, Woncheuk took as a disciple a Korean-born monk named Dojeung (Chinese: 道證), who travelled to Silla in 692 and propagated Woncheuk's exegetical tradition. His work was also influential on the Japanese branch of Yogacara, the Hosso school, since Hosso monks like Gyosin (c. 750), Genju (723–797), and Gomyo (750–834) relied on Woncheuk's works.

Woncheuk is well known amongst scholars of Tibetan Buddhism for his Commentary on the Saṃdhinirmocana sūtra which was translated into Tibetan in the ninth century.

== Works ==
Choo (2006: p. 123) lists Woncheuk's three extant works:

- the Commentary on the Heart Sutra (traditional Chinese: 般若心經贊), which is the first commentary on Xuanzang's translation of the Heart Sutra
- the Commentary on the Samdhinirmocana-sutra (Korean: Haesimmilgyeongso, traditional Chinese: 解深密經疏, Sanskrit: Gambhīrasaṃdhinirmocanasūtraṭīkā), which is the largest extant commentary on that sutra—called "the Great Chinese Commentary" by the eminent Vajrayana scholar Je Tsongkhapa
- the Commentary on the Benevolent King Sutra (traditional Chinese: 仁王般若經疏).

Woncheuk also wrote a commentary to the Cheng weishi lun, but this has not survived.

Choo (2006: p. 125) holds that though the Heart Sutra is generally identified as within the auspice of the Second Turning of the Dharmacakra (Sanskrit), Woncheuk in his commentary provides an exegesis from the Third Turning:

Within the Mahāyāna doctrinal classification, the Heart Sūtra belongs to the Buddha's Second turning of the Wheel, the Emptiness period of Dharma, and most extant commentaries approach it from the perspective of the Mādhyamika doctrine of the Emptiness period (Chung, 1977:87). However, Wonch'uk interprets the Heart Sūtra from the Yogācāra perspective, and his Commentary therefore offers the reader a unique opportunity to examine the Mādhyamika doctrine of emptiness from the Yogācāra perspective.).
