= Sthiramati =

Sthiramati (Sanskrit; Chinese: Anhui 安慧, and Jianhui 堅慧; Tibetan: Blo gros brtan pa) was a 6th-century Indian Buddhist scholar-monk. Sthiramati was a student of a Yogācāra scholar named Gunamati, and he was also a contemporary of another 6th-century Yogācāra scholar, Dharmapala of Nālandā. Sthiramati is connected with Valābhi university (present-day Gujarat), and also with Nālandā. Evidence from two inscriptions indicate that a figure named Sthiramati founded a monastery at Valābhi.

Sthiramati is mainly known for his numerous commentaries to Yogācāra and Abhidharma works which synthesized a varied tradition into a more coherent system.

== Philosophy ==
While Sthiramati closely follows the classic philosophy of Yogācāra Buddhism found in the works of Vasubandhu and Asanga, his work also contains several innovative interpretations of Yogācāra philosophy.

One of Sthiramati's innovative contributions is his theory of meaning found in his Triṃśikā-bhāṣya. According to Sthiramati, all language use is figurative or metaphorical (Sanskrit: upacāra). Drawing on a passage in Vasubandhu, Sthiramati argues that all phenomena (dharmas) are mere mental appearances (nirbhāsa), i.e. mental representations (vijñapti). As such, no word can relate to an objectively existent phenomena (since no such thing exists). Words are only related to constructed mental appearances which come from the dependently arisen transformation of consciousness (vijñāna-pariṇāma). These phenomena deceptively appear as objectively existent things, but are ultimately unreal, like optical illusions. Thus, no words have an objective referent, and thus all language is necessarily figurative, a theory that has been termed pan-figurative or pan-metaphorical.

Sthiramati's philosophy is one of various attempts to systematize and develop Yogācāra Buddhism. His system differed from that of other Yogācāra thinkers of his time, like Dharmapala of Nalanda, in various ways. Their varying interpretations are also discussed in Xuanzang's (7th century) Chéng Wéishì Lùn. One point of contention was the status of the dependent nature. Sthiramati thought that the dependent nature was characterized by duality (of subject-object), which is the result of false imagination. So for Sthiramati, the dependent nature is empty and not ultimately real. In Sthiramati's system, the only thing that has real existence (dravyasat) is "the bare reality, free from the differentiation into subject and object". This is the true essence of the dependent nature (i.e. the perfected nature). Because of this, Sthiramati's view has also been compared to the Nirākāravāda ("false aspectarian") view of Yogācāra by modern scholars, since he holds that all mental images are unreal and false.

Meanwhile, in Dharmapala's system, the dependent nature is the basis or pivot for both the imagined nature (if the dependent nature is discriminated dualistically) and the perfected nature (if duality is removed). For him, the dependent nature is both empty in one sense (when it is falsely discriminated) but also not-empty is another sense (in its true non-dual structure). Thus, for Dharmapala, the dependent nature and the perfected nature are both real, and they are also understood as being neither the same nor different. Because of this, Dharmapala's view has been seen as prefiguring the Sākāravāda view.

Another disagreement between these two leading Yogācāra interpretations was their understandings of the doctrine of the transformation of consciousness (vijñāna-pariṇāma). According to some Yogācāra thinkers, consciousness transforms into various aspects: the seeing aspect (darśana-bhāga, i.e. subjectivity), the objective aspect (nimitta-bhāga, i.e. all objects of experience), the self-reflexive or self-knowing aspect (saṃvitti-bhāga, a division introduced by Dignaga), and (in Dharmapala's system), awareness of self-awareness (svasaṃvitti-saṃvitti). For Dharmapala, these four divisions were seen as working simultaneously to give rise to experience. However, Sthiramati's system only accepts the first three divisions. Furthermore, for Sthiramati, the first two divisions are imagined and ultimately unreal, while only the self-reflexive aspect is ultimately real. Thus, in Sthiramati's system, there is truly only one aspect (bhāga), one single dynamic self-aware consciousness in which causes and effects arise moment by moment.

The view outlined above is the traditional understanding of Sthiramati's philosophy in Chinese Yogācāra scholasticism. Some modern scholars like Hidenori Sakuma have questioned theis tradition understanding of Sthiramati's Yogācāra views due to a lack of primary source evidence. Sakuma argues that this view derives from the work of Kuiji, and that this is unreliable.

Furthermore, Sakuma also argues that it is likely there were different Indian commentators whose work later became conflated into one figure named "Sthiramati".

== Works ==
Sthiramati wrote ten surviving commentaries on various Buddhist treatises:

1. The Explication of the Compendium of the Abhidharma (Abhidharmasamuccayavyākhyā; currently in Sanskrit, Tibetan, and Chinese). The Tibetan tradition attribute this text to an author named Jinaputra.
2. The Commentary on the Treasury of Abhidharma [Called] True Reality (Tattvārthā Abhidharmakośaṭīkā, survives in full Tibetan translation and some parts in Sanskrit)
3. The Commentary on the Treatise on the Five Constituents (Pañcaskandhakavibhāṣā; survives in Sanskrit and Tibetan)
4. The Commentary on the Treatise on Mental Presentation in Thirty Verses (Triṃśikāvijñaptibhāṣya; survives in Sanskrit and Tibetan)
5. The Commentary on the Distinguishing of the Middle from the Extremes (Madhyāntavibhāgaṭīkā; survives in Sanskrit and Tibetan)
6. The Commentary on the Comments to the Ornament of [Mahāyāna] Sūtras (*Sūtrālaṃkāravṛttibhāṣya; survives in Tibetan)
7. The Commentary on the Kāśyapa Chapter (*Kāśyapaparivartaṭīkā; survives in Tibetan and Chinese)
8. The Commentary on the Mahāyāna Madhyamaka (Dasheng zhongguan shilun 大乘中觀釋論; survives in Chinese)
9. The Commentary on the Exposition of Akṣayamati (*Akṣayamatinirdeśaṭīkā; survives in Tibetan)
10. A commentary on the Collection of Means of Knowledge (Pramanasamuccaya; currently lost).

Furthermore, "Sāramati" (Chinese: Suoluomodi 娑囉末底) is the author of the Ratnagotravibhāga according to the Chinese translator and scholar Fazang (643–712). However, this is likely to be a different figure than the commentator Sthiramati according to Sakuma. Takasaki Jikido is certain that the author of the embedded commentary (verse and prose) to the core text (verse) of the Ratnagotravibhāga is "Sāramati".
