= Zhiyan =

Chinese Buddhist monk of the Huayan school

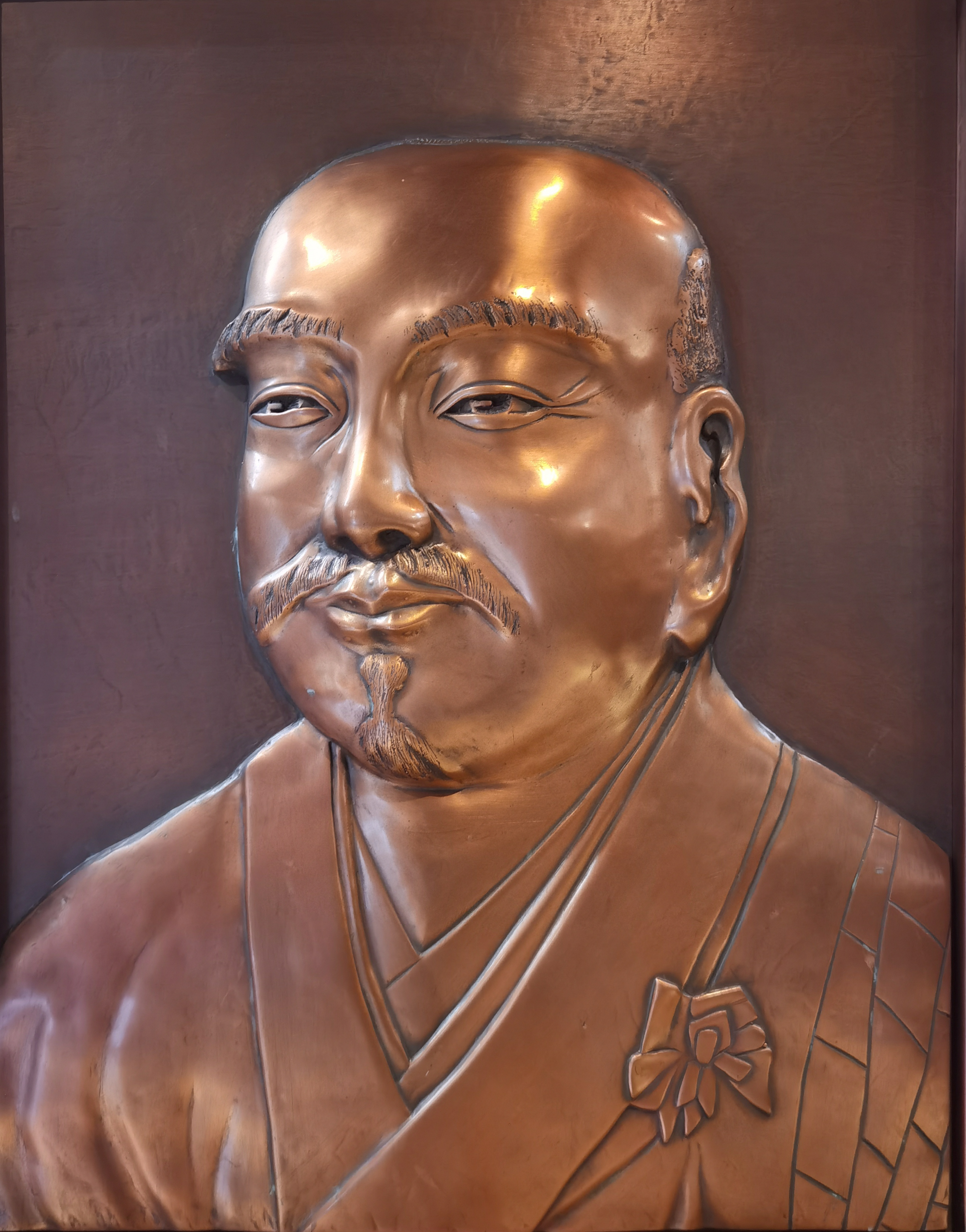
Chinese carving of Zhiyan

Zhiyan (Chinese: 智儼; pinyin: Zhìyǎn) (602–668) was a prominent monk of the Tang dynasty who is considered the second patriarch of the Chinese Buddhist Huayan school. He was a disciple of the foundational figure Dushun (杜順) and later became the mentor to both Fazang (法藏), who systematized Huayan doctrines, and the Korean monk Uisang (義湘). During his lifetime, Zhiyan was often referred to by honorific titles such as “Master Zhixiang” (至相大師) and “The Venerable of Yunhua” (雲華尊者).

== Life ==
Zhiyan was born in the second year of the Renshou era under Emperor Wen of the Sui dynasty (602 CE). His father was Zhao Jing, who served as an assistant official in Shen Prefecture. In 613 CE, Zhiyan began his training under Dushun at the early age of twelve, entering study at Zhixiang Monastery (至相寺) located on Mount Zhongnan (終南山). At the age of twenty, he received full monastic ordination and thereafter devoted himself to rigorous study of key Buddhist texts, including the Four-Part Vinaya (四分律), Abhidharmakośa (倶舍論), Satyasiddhi-śāstra (成實論), Daśabhūmika-śāstra (十地論), and the Mahāparinirvāṇa Sūtra (涅槃經). Over the years, he attained a deep and wide-ranging understanding of Mahāyāna Buddhist doctrines, focusing his studies on Chinese Yogācāra, including the Dilun tradition of Ratnamati and Huiyuan as well as Paramartha's Shelun school and Xuanzang's new Chengweshilun tradition.

He also studied under Master Jinglin and obtained a copy of the Avataṃsaka Sūtra (Huayanjing, 華嚴經), upon which he resolved to devote himself to the study of the Avataṃsaka. Zhiyan lectured on the Avatamsaka Sutra at Yunhua Temple and was a teacher to the influential Huayan patriarch Fazang. He died at Qingjing Temple in the first year of Emperor Zhaozong of Tang.

Zhiyan also engaged critically with Xuanzang’s work, relegating Yogācāra to a provisional "initial teaching" while elevating Huayan’s dharmadhātu (法界) philosophy as supreme. This tension exemplified the broader shift from Indian scholasticism toward a Sinicized Buddhism, culminating in Huayan’s dominance and the gradual decline of orthodox Yogācāra in China.

Among his disciples were Bochen, Fazang, Huixiao, Huaiqi, and Uisang.

== Teachings ==
Zhiyan developed key Huayan doctrines such as the theory of the "dependent arising from the dharma realm" (法界缘起), which he saw as the essence of Huayan Sutra and the doctrine of the ten mysterious gates (十玄门), which are principles that explain the interfusion of all phenomena and how the entire cosmos (Dharmadhatu) arises out of the Dharmakaya / buddha-nature.

=== Classification schema ===
Zhiyan also developed the classic doctrinal classification system (panjiao) of the Huayan school. This system includes all Buddhist teachings within a five part doctrinal schema:

1. The Initial Teachings, including Hinayana teachings found in the Agamas and Abhidharma as well as Yogacara
2. The Mahayana teachings which focus on emptiness, non-arising and lack of form, and include Prajñaparamita, and Madhyamaka teachings
3. The "Final" Mahayana teaching on buddha-nature and relies on sources like the Mahāyāna Mahāparinirvāṇa Sūtra, the Awakening of Faith, the Lankavatara, Srimaladevi sutra, Ratnagotravibhaga, and Dilun shastra.
4. The Sudden Teaching, which is non-verbal and non-conceptual and is based on the Vimalakīrti Sūtra's idea of a teaching that does not rely on words. This idea is also traceable to Jingying Huiyuan and may have also been influenced by the rising Chan (Zen) movement.
5. The Complete or Perfect (Ch: yuan, lit. "Round") Teaching taught in the Huayan Sutra of the perfect interfusion of all phenomena. This also includes the Lotus Sutra as well.

Zhiyan's classification system categories is quite similar to those used by Tiantai Zhiyi, and it may have been influenced by them. This similarity was even discussed by traditional scholars like Huayan scholar Huiyuan (673–?). However, Zhihua Li also argues that the sources for these categories can also be found in the Commentary to the Mahāyānasaṃgraha (Vasubandhu's Mahāyānasaṃgrahabhāṣya, the key text of the Shelun school) and in Huiguang's Dilun works which distinguish between gradual, sudden, and perfect teachings. Nevertheless, the influence of Zhiyi is also found in other elements of Zhiyan's work, including in his understanding of the One Vehicle Perfect Teaching. Where Zhiyan differs with Zhiyi is in the status of the Huayan and Lotus Sutras. While Zhiyi argues the Lotus Sutra contains only the Perfect teaching without being mixed with other teachings (while claiming the Huayan sutra contains Perfect teaching mixed with other teachings), Zhiyan argues that the Lotus Sutra also contains a mixed teaching.

=== Pure Land practice ===
Zhiyan also discussed Pure Land Buddhism in his writings, He regarded the Western Pure Land of Amitābha not as the ultimate destination but as a crucial expedient path within the larger framework of the Huayan worldview. He believed that the Pure Land exists within the vast "ocean of worlds" encompassed by the Lotus Treasury World of the Buddha Vairocana, and that teachings about the Pure Land were designed to guide beginners with accessible practices that help establish faith. Thus he writes:

If we follow the One Vehicle, Amitābha’s land is contained within the ocean of worlds. Why? Because it serves as a nearby and accessible realm to guide beginners and establish faith in the teaching. The true buddha land is ultimately interpenetrating and ineffable.

Thus, for Zhiyan, the Pure Land represents a provisional yet vital realm that facilitates the spiritual progress of ordinary beings who are still prone to regression and unable to directly realize the highest truths described in the Huayan Sutra.

Zhiyan taught that rebirth in the Western Pure Land was especially suited for those in the early stages of practice (such as those on the stages of faith), because it offered a condition of non-retrogression to those still subject to backsliding on the path. However, this rebirth was only temporary; the ultimate goal was to progress from the Pure Land to the Lotus Treasury World, the ideal realm of full enlightenment and bodhisattva activity. On his deathbed, Zhiyan himself vowed "now I shall temporarily go to the Pure Land, and later roam the Lotus Treasury World. You all follow me and share the same aspiration." As such, for Zhiyan, Pure Land practice served as a practical and compassionate springboard to help practitioners eventually reach the highest Huayan realization, which allows one to freely roam the Lotus Treasury world without backsliding.

== Works ==
Zhiyan eventually focused his intellectual and contemplative efforts on the Avataṃsaka Sūtra (華嚴經), engaging deeply with its philosophical implications. He produced a substantial body of exegetical literature on the subject. Among his surviving writings are:

- A Guiding Framework for the Thorough Investigation and Classification of the Avataṃsaka Sūtra (《大方廣佛華嚴經搜玄分齊通智方軌》, 10 fascicles),
- Categorical Notes on the Inner Chapters of the Avataṃsaka Sūtra (《華嚴經內章門等雜孔目》, 4 fascicles),
- Fifty Essential Questions and Answers on the Avataṃsaka (《華嚴五十要問答》, 2 fascicles),
- Ten Mysterious Gates of the One Vehicle in the Avataṃsaka (《華嚴一乘十玄門》, 1 fascicle),
- Concise Commentary on the Vajracchedikā Prajñāpāramitā Sūtra (《金剛般若波羅蜜經略疏》, 2 fascicles),
- Commentary on the Treatise Attributed to Asaṅga on the Absence of Self-Nature (《無性攝論疏》, 4 fascicles).

A biographical entry for Zhiyan is included in the twenty-fifth scroll of the Xu Gaoseng Zhuan (續高僧傳, T2060.50.644a8), a supplement to the Biographies of Eminent Monks. For a detailed academic study of his life and works, see Robert M. Gimello’s dissertation (1976).
