= Dan Lusthaus =

American writer

Dan Lusthaus is an American writer on Buddhism. He is a graduate of Temple University's Department of Religion, and is a specialist in Yogācāra. The author of several articles and books on the topic, Lusthaus has taught at UCLA, Florida State University, the University of Missouri, and in the Autumn of 2020 he was an Associate in the Department of South Asian Studies at Harvard University.

Lusthaus also collaborated with Heng-ching Shih in the translation of Kuiji's (K'uei-chi) commentary on the Heart Sutra with the Numata translation project. Lusthaus is an editor for the Digital Dictionary of Buddhism, in the area of Indian/East Asian Yogācāra/Tathāgatagarbha. He contributed the contents of his catalogue of the major Yogācāra translations of Xuanzang to the DDB, as well as a number of other terms related to the Cheng Weishi Lun and Yogācārabhūmi-śāstra.

== Publications ==
- Lusthaus, Dan (1985). "Reflections on the Mirror Metaphor in Hui-neng, Chuang Tzu and Lao Tzu". Journal of Chinese Philosophy. 12 (June 1985): 169–178. doi:10.1111/j.1540-6253.1985.tb00005.x.
- Lusthaus, Dan (1990). "Retracing the Human-Nature vs. World-Nature Dichotomy in Lao Tzu". Journal of Chinese Philosophy. 17 (June 1990): 187–214. doi:10.1111/j.1540-6253.1990.tb00408.x.
- Lusthaus, Dan (1995). Ian P. McGreal (ed.). "Lao Tzu" Great Thinkers of the Eastern World. Harper Collins.
- Lusthaus, Dan (1999). "A Retrospective of Yogācāra Scholarship in the Twentieth Century" Proceedings of the Eleventh Annual International Conference on Chinese Philosophy, Taipei, Taiwan.
- translated from the Chinese of K'uei-chi (Taishō volume 33, number 1710) by Heng-ching Shih; in collaboration with Dan Lusthaus. (2002). A Comprehensive Commentary on the Heart Sutra (Prajñāpāramitā-hŗdaya-sūtra) by K'uei-chi, translated by Heng-Ching Shih in Collaboration with Dan Lusthaus. Berkeley: Numata, v. 66-I in Tripiţaka Series. Berkeley, Calif.: Numata Center for Buddhist Translation and Research. ISBN 1-886439-11-7.
- Lusthaus, Dan (2002). Buddhist Phenomenology: A Philosophical Investigation of Yogacara Buddhism and the Ch'eng Wei-shih Lun. Curzon Critical Studies in Buddhism Series. London: Routledge. xii + 611 pages, Appendices, bibliography, index. ISBN 0-7007-1186-4.
- Lusthaus, Dan (2003). Scott Cook (ed.). Aporetic Ethics in the Zhuangzi: Hiding the World in the World: Uneven Discourses on the Zhuangzi. State University of New York.
- Lusthaus, Dan (2003). "The Heart Sutra in Chinese Yogācāra: Some Comparative Comments on the Heart Sutra Commentaries of Wŏnch'ŭk and K'uei-chi". International Journal of Buddhist Thought and Culture. 3 (Sept. 2003).
- Lusthaus, Dan (2006). Donald Borchert (ed.). "Yogācāra". Encyclopedia of Philosophy (2nd ed.). Detroit: Macmillan Reference USA.
