= Chidatsu =

Priest of the Hosso School of Japanese Buddhism

Chidatsu (c. 653) was a priest of the Hosso School of Japanese Buddhism.

== Nomenclature and etymology ==
Chitatsu / Chidatsu (智達)

== Exegesis ==
The Soka Gakkai Dictionary of Buddhism (2002) mentions Hsyan-tsang, Tz'u-en, Dosho of Gango-ji, Nara, Gango-ji, Chitsuare in reference to elucidating that Chitatsu was:

A priest of the Dharma Characteristics (Hosso) school in Japan. In 658, together with Chitsu, he journeyed to China and studied the doctrine of the Dharma Characteristics school under Hsyan-tsang and his disciple Tz'u-en. They brought the doctrine back with them. Earlier, Dōshō of Gangō-ji temple in Nara went to China in 653 and studied under Hsyan-tsang. On his return he spread the Dharma Characteristics teaching at Gango-ji. Thus Chitatsu and Chitsuare regarded together as the second to propagate the doctrine of this school in Japan. After his return, Chitatsu lived at Gango-ji temple and disseminated the Dharma Characteristics doctrine.

== See also ==
- Yogacara
