= Triṃśikā-vijñaptimātratā =

Poetic treatise by the Indian Buddhist monk Vasubandhu

Chinese name
- Traditional Chinese: 唯識三十論頌
- Simplified Chinese: 唯识三十论颂
Transcriptions
Standard Mandarin
- Hanyu Pinyin: Wéishí Sānshí Lùn Sòng
- Bopomofo: ㄨㄟˊ ㄕˊ ㄙㄢ ㄕˊ ㄌㄨㄣˋ ㄙㄨㄥˋ
- Wade–Giles: Wei^{2}-shih^{2} San^{1}-shih^{2} Lun^{4} Sung^{4}
- IPA: [wěɪ.ʂɨ̌ sán.ʂɨ̌ lwə̂n sʊ̂ŋ]
Yue: Cantonese
- Yale Romanization: Wàihsīk Sāamsahp Leuhn Juhng
- Jyutping: wai4 sik1 saam1 sap6 leon6 zung6
- IPA: [wɐj˩.sɪk̚˥ sam˥.sɐp̚˨ lɵn˨ tsʊŋ˨]

Alternative Chinese name
- Traditional Chinese: 唯識三十頌
- Simplified Chinese: 唯识三十颂
Transcriptions
Standard Mandarin
- Hanyu Pinyin: Wéishí Sānshí Sòng
- Bopomofo: ㄨㄟˊ ㄕˊ ㄙㄢ ㄕˊ ㄙㄨㄥˋ
- Wade–Giles: Wei^{2}-shih^{2} San^{1}-shih^{2} Sung^{4}
- IPA: [wěɪ.ʂɨ̌ sán.ʂɨ̌ sʊ̂ŋ]
Yue: Cantonese
- Yale Romanization: Wàihsīk Sāamsahp Juhng
- Jyutping: wai4 sik1 saam1 sap6 zung6
- IPA: [wɐj˩.sɪk̚˥ sam˥.sɐp̚˨ tsʊŋ˨]

Korean name
- Hangul: 유식삼십송
- Hanja: 唯識三十頌
Transcriptions
- Revised Romanization: Yusiksamsipsong
- McCune–Reischauer: Yusiksamsipsong

Japanese name
- Kanji: 唯識三十頌
- Kana: ゆいしきさんじゅうじゅ
Transcriptions
- Romanization: Yuishikisanjūju

The Triṃśikā-vijñaptimātratā (Sanskrit; Chinese: 唯識三十論頌), also known simply as the Triṃśikā or occasionally by its English translation Thirty Verses on Manifestation Only, is a brief poetic treatise by the Indian Buddhist monk Vasubandhu. It was composed in the 4th or 5th century CE and became one of the core texts for the Yogācāra school of Mahāyāna Buddhism. In it he touches on foundational Yogācāra concepts such as the storehouse consciousness, the afflicted mental consciousness, and the three natures, among others. Together with the Vimśatikā form a standard summary of Vasubandhu's understanding of Yogācāra.

== Manuscripts and translations ==
The Triṃśikā was translated into Chinese by Xuanzang in 648 CE at Hongfu Monastery. It was also translated into Tibetan in antiquity. A version in the original Sanskrit also survives.

== Commentaries ==
In India, the most influential commentary on the Triṃśikā was written by Sthiramati in the 6th century. According to Xuanzang, who studied the Triṃśikā at Nalanda in the 7th century under Śīlabhadra, there were 10 known prose commentaries on the text. These were by Sthiramati, Dharmapala of Nalanda, Nanda, Citrabhānu, Guṇamati, Jinamitra, Jñānamitra, Jñānacandra, Bandhuśrī, Śuddhacandra, and Jinaputra. Xuanzang initially intended to translate all of these, but on the advice of his students, especially Kuiji, Xuanzang instead chose to combine them into a single text that focused primarily on Dharmapala's commentary. He did so because his teacher Śīlabhadra was a student of Dharmapala, and thus Xuanzang believed Dharmapala's interpretation to be the most accurate. Among the others commentators, Xuanzang most often included excerpts from Sthiramati, Nanda, and Citrabhānu, but usually only to provide contrast with Dharmapala. The result of this work was the Cheng Weishi Lun, which became the most important text for the tradition of East Asian Yogācāra. Xuanzang's student Kuiji in turn created his own commentary on this text, the Cheng weishi lun shuji.

After Xuanzang's pilgrimage, Indian commentary on the Triṃśikā continued to be produced. In the late 7th century or early 8th century, Vinītadeva, also working at Nalanda, produced commentaries on both the Triṃśikā and the Vimśatikā which survive in Tibetan translation and some Sanskrit fragments.
