= The Association of Teachers of Japanese =

Japanese professional organization

The Association of Teachers of Japanese (ATJ) is "an international, non-profit, non-political organization of scholars, teachers, and students of Japanese language, literature, and linguistics dedicated to teaching and scholarship and to the exchange of information among teachers and other professionals to help broaden and deepen knowledge and appreciation of Japan and its culture." It is based out of the University of Colorado in the United States.

The foundation has EIN 39-1481425 as a 501(c)(3) Public Charity; in 2024 it claimed $1,336,677 in total revenue and $534,286 in total assets.

== Activities ==
One of the ATJ's main aims is to assist in the improvement of the quality of the teaching of Japanese language, Japanese literature, Japanese linguistics and Japanese culture at both a secondary and post-secondary level. To that end, it provides advice on related matters to individuals or institutions that request it.

As well as providing a conduit for exchange of information, the ATJ is also engaged in assisting those with an interest in studying in Japan, from providing information both pre- and post-departure, to offering Bridging Foundation scholarships to US undergraduates who are planning to study abroad in Japan.

== Publications ==
The ATJ produces several publications: a newsletter four times a year, in September, February, November and April, and the twice-yearly Japanese Language and Literature, formerly The Journal of the Association of Teachers of Japanese, available in April and November. The newsletter offers news of the association, details of programs and workshops, job listings, and regional news, whereas Japanese Language and Literature contains scholarly articles related to the fields with which the ATJ is concerned.

For those working within the field, the ATJ offers a directory of current job vacancies as well as a variety of materials for use in the classroom with respect to both Japanese culture and language. It also has on-line special interest groups (SIGs) for those interested in Classical Japanese, Heritage Language study, Study Abroad for Advanced Skills, Community College Japanese, and Professional Development.

== References/External links ==
- ATJ Official Site
- National Council of Less Commonly Taught Languages

Specific
