= Marian Ury =

American literary scholar (1932–1995)

- Born: Marian Bloom; October 5, 1932; Chicago, Illinois, U.S.
- Died: April 25, 1995 (age 62); Oakland, California, U.S.
- Occupations: Literary scholar, college professor, translator

Marian Bloom Ury (October 5, 1932 – April 25, 1995) was an American scholar of medieval Japanese literature. She was a professor in the departments of East Asian languages and comparative literature at the University of California, Davis.

In 2003, the journal Japanese Language and Literature published a special issue, "In Memory of Marian Ury."

== Early life and education ==
Bloom was born in Chicago and raised in California, the daughter of Louis S. Bloom and Edith Lapin Bloom. She had an older brother, Arnold. Her family was Jewish. She graduated from the University of California, Berkeley in 1953, and completed doctoral studies there.

== Career ==
Ury was a professor of East Asian languages and comparative literature at the University of California, Davis (UCD) from 1969 until 1995. She started a comparative literature courses on Chinese and Japanese literature in 1975 and on myths and legends in 1978. In the mid-1980s spoke on Lady Murasaki, and she held a grant from the National Endowment for the Humanities, to fund her translation of the works of 11th-century Japanese writer Ōe no Masafusa. She played violin with the Oakland Symphony, the Lydian String Quartet, and the De Silva Quartet, and with her husband she commissioned works for the Kronos Quartet.

== Publications ==
Ury's work was published in academic journals including Monumenta Nipponica, Journal of Japanese Studies, The Journal of the Association of Teachers of Japanese, and Prairie Schooner.

- "Recluses and Eccentric Monks: Tales from the Hosshinshū by Kamo no Chōmei" (1972, translator)
- "Victims" (1973)
- "The Imaginary Kingdom and the Translator's Art: Notes on Re-Reading Waley's Genji" (1976)
- Tales of Times Now Past: Sixty-Two Stories from a Medieval Japanese Collection (1979, editor)
- "A Heian Note on the Supernatural" (1988)
- "Readable Japanese Mythology: Selections from Nihon shoki and Kojiki" (1990, with Robert Borgen)
- Poems of the Five Mountains: An Introduction to the Literature of the Zen Monasteries (1992)
- "The Ōe Conversations" (1993)
- "Ōe no Masafusa and the Practice of Heian Autobiography" (1996, with Robert Borgen, published posthumously)
- "Nuns and Other Female Devotees in Genkō shakusho (1322), Japan's First History of Buddhism" (2002, with Robert Borgen, published posthumously)

== Personal life and legacy ==
Bloom married statistician Hans Konrad Ury in 1955. She died from cancer in 1995, at the age of 62, at her home in Oakland, California. The Department of East Asian Languages at UCD offers a Marian Ury Japan Travel Award in her memory. In 2003, the journal Japanese Language and Literature dedicated a special issue to Ury. Her papers are in the collection of UC Davis Library.

== References and further reading ==
- Gatten, Aileen. “Marian Ury: Selected Bibliography.” Japanese Language and Literature, vol. 37, no. 2, 2003, pp. 101–02. JSTOR, https://www.jstor.org/stable/3594862. Accessed 15 Apr. 2025.
