= Xingjiao Temple =

Buddhist temple in Xi'an, China

Coordinates: 34°05′29″N 109°02′02″E

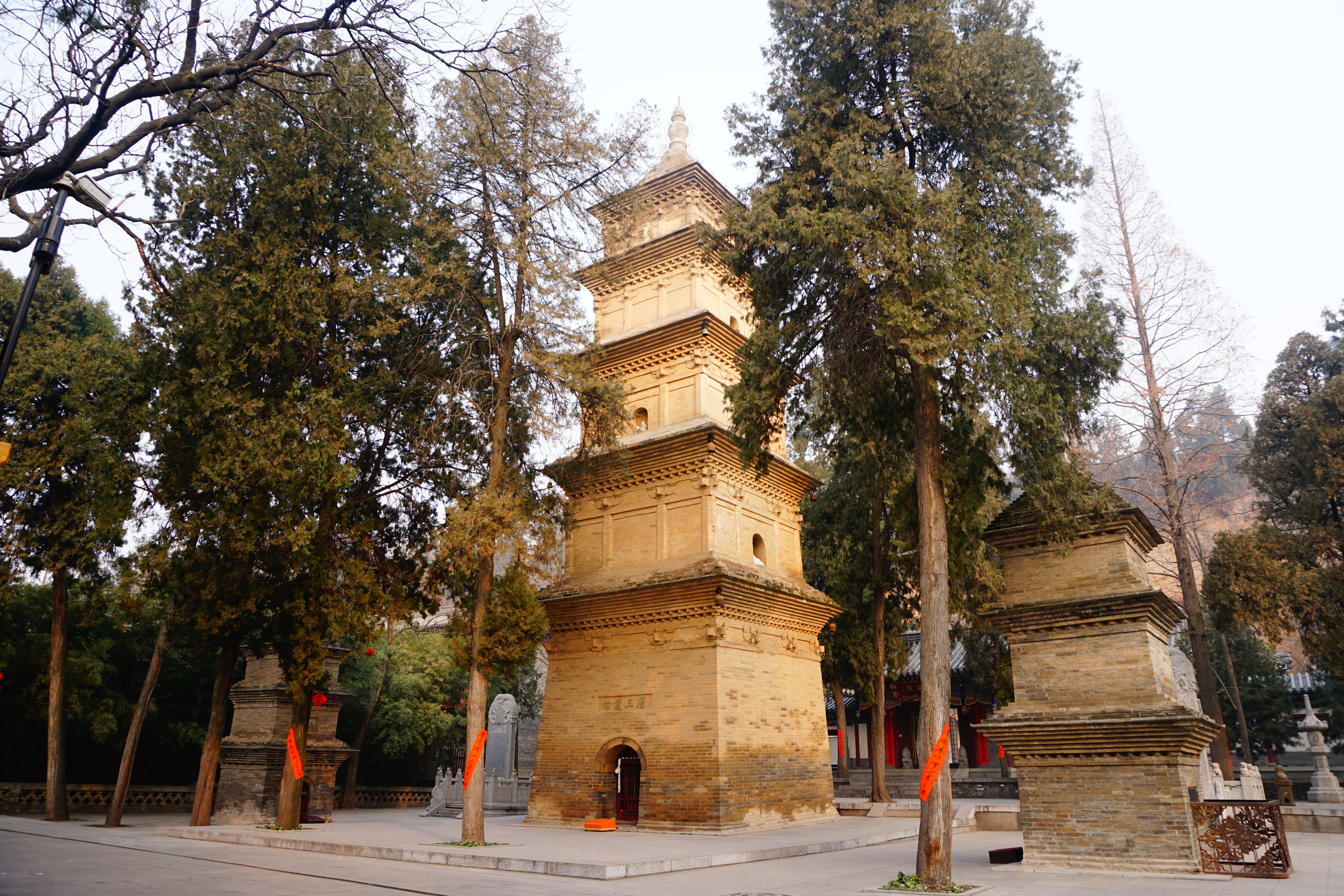
Pagodas of the Xingjiao Temple

The Xingjiao Temple (Chinese: 兴教寺; pinyin: Xīngjiào Sì) is located in Shaoling Yuan, Chang'an District of Xi'an.

The five-storied Buddhist relic pagoda, preserving the remains of Xuanzang, the celebrated 7th-century monk, scholar, and traveller, stands alongside the pagodas of his disciples, Kuiji and Yuance.

Xingjiao Temple was built in AD 669 to reinhume Xuanzang and was one of eight famed temples in Fanchuan in the Tang dynasty.

Although the original Tang dynasty stone pagoda is still standing, the temple was burnt to the ground during the Tongzhi period of the Qing dynasty. It was rebuilt during the Republic of China.

Along with other sites along the Silk Road, this pagoda was inscribed in 2014 on the UNESCO World Heritage List as the Silk Roads: the Routes Network of Chang'an-Tianshan Corridor World Heritage Site.
