= Dōshō =

Dōshō (道昭; 629–700 C.E.) was a Japanese monk credited with playing an influential role in the founding of Buddhism in Japan.

In C.E. 653, the Dōshō travelled to China, studying under the Buddhist monk Xuanzang, whose travels to India were immortalized in the book Records of the Western Regions. His studies centered on Xuanzang's Weishi, the Chinese variant of Indian Yogācāra, but he was also exposed to Chinese Chán while there, which would later lead to his influence on the founding of Japanese Zen Buddhism. In China, the school is known as Wéishí-zōng (唯識宗, "Consciousness Only" school), or Fǎxiàng-zōng (法相宗, "Dharma Characteristics" school). In Japan, it is known as Hossō-shū (法相宗) or Yuishiki-shū (唯識宗).

After returning from China, Dōshō became a priest at Gangō-ji, one of the great temples, the Nanto Shichi Daiji, in Nara, Japan. His teachings were based on the consciousness-only philosophy taught by Xuanzang, which in Japanese he called Hossō. It was at Gangō-ji that later he founded Japan's first meditation hall.

There is a legend about his return from China that says Xuanzang had given him a magical kettle in which he could prepare medicines that could cure any illness. The monk travelling with Dōshō was supposedly cured before embarking on the sea trip back to Japan. However, while at sea a great storm came upon them. A diviner on board said that the sea god wanted the kettle. Dōshō at first resisted, but eventually gave in, and the storm immediately abated.

== Bibliography ==
- Jonathan Morris Augustine (2004). Buddhist Hagiography in Early Japan: Images of Compassion in the Gyoki Tradition. Routledge. pp. 90–. ISBN 978-1-134-35290-6.
- Marian Ury (1979). Tales of Times Now Past: Sixty-two Stories from a Medieval Japanese Collection. University of California Press. pp. 84–86. ISBN 978-0-520-03864-6.
