= Cheng Weishi Lun =

Yogacara Buddhist philosophy treatise

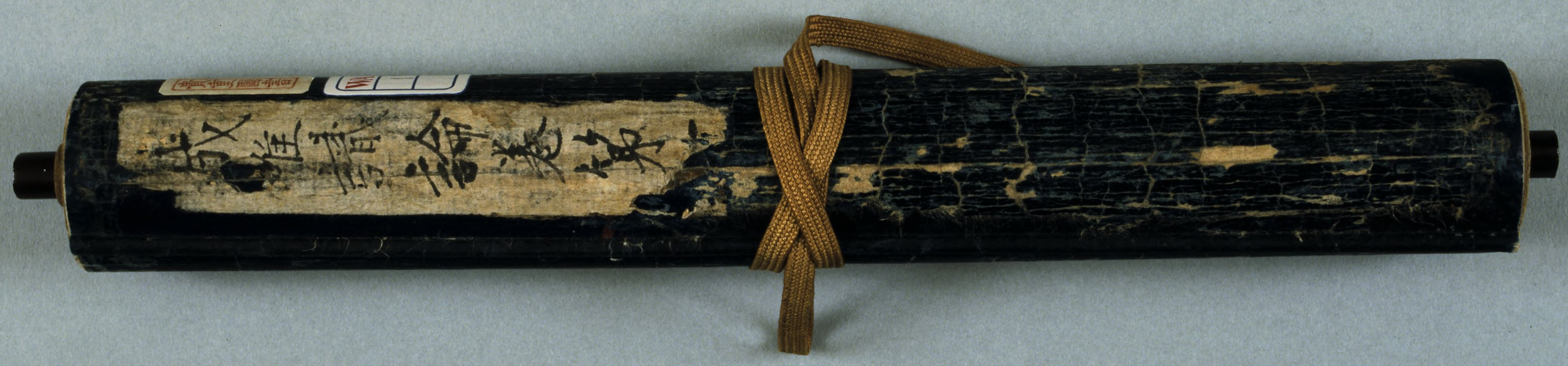
A 14th century Japanese scroll of the Cheng Weishi Lun (Jp: Jōyuishikiron)

Cheng Weishi Lun (Chinese: 成唯識論; pinyin: Chéng Wéishí Lùn, CWSL, Sanskrit reconstruction: *Vijñaptimātrāsiddhiśāstra, English: The Treatise on the Demonstration of Consciousness-only, Taisho Catalog number 1585), is a comprehensive treatise on the philosophy of Yogacara Buddhism and a commentary on Vasubandhu's seminal work, the Triṃśikā-vijñaptimātratā (Thirty Verses on Consciousness-only).

The CWSL was written by the early Tang dynasty monk Xuanzang (602–664), who drew on numerous Indian Yogacara sources and scholars as well as his experience of studying under Indian Yogacara masters like Nalanda's Śīlabhadra and Prasenajit.

== Overview ==
When Xuanzang was studying Buddhism in India at Nālandā University with masters Śīlabhadra and Prasenajit, he is said to have studied ten commentaries on Vasubandhu's Triṃśikā-vijñaptimātratā, those of: Dharmapala, Sthiramati, Nanda, Citrabhanu, Bandhusri, Suddhacandra, Jinaputra, Gunamati, Jinamitra, and Jñanacandra.

Back in China, Xuanzang drew upon his studies in India to write a detailed explanation of Vasubandhu's Triṃśikā-vijñaptimātratā. This synthetic commentary became the Cheng Weishi Lun. Kuiji claimed that the interpretations of Dharmapāla were the only correct ones found in the CWSL and that Xuanzang follows the views of Dharmapāla. However, modern scholars have found that Kuiji often attributes to Dharmapāla certain interpretations which are actually found in the works of Sthiramati. Some modern scholars like Dan Lusthaus suggest that it is actually more likely that the CWSL reflects the views of Xuanzang's teacher Prasenajit, as well as Xuanzang's broad studies in other sources like the Yogacarabhumi.

According to Francis Cook,

The theory of the Ch’eng wei-shih lun is that basic or fundamental consciousness (mula-vijñana) comes to appear naturally and spontaneously in the form of a seeing part (darsana-bhaga) and a seen part (nimitta-bhaga). The seeming reality of an inner self perceiving external events is nothing more than one aspect of consciousness perceiving itself in the form of images. A third part of consciousness, the manas, or thinking aspect, interprets the two parts as a self and an external world. This situation is also the basis for hatred, craving, fear, and other passions. In fact, the apparently real external world of things is nothing but internal images perceived by consciousness and grasped as a source of attachment by thought.

=== Influence and commentaries ===
The Chéng Wéishì Lùn became one of the key texts of East Asian Yogācāra, both by Chinese ("Faxiang") and Japanese ("Hossō") thinkers. It is a major doctrinal source and summa for this tradition, also known as the Consciousness Only School (Wéishí-zōng).

Kuiji, one of Xuanzang's key pupils, wrote a commentary on the CWSL, called the Chéng Wéishì Lùn Shuji (成唯識 論述記; Taishō no. 1830, vol. 43, 229a–606c). Kuiji's commentary relies on the epistemology of Dignāga and remains focused on an orthodox Yogacara interpretation.

The Korean monk Woncheuk, another influential pupil of Xuanzang, wrote his own commentary, the Chéng Wéishì Lùn Ceshu, which disagrees with several of Kuiji's positions. Woncheuk was a follower of the Shelun school (攝論宗) of Yogacara, which draws on the work of Paramārtha (499–569). This tradition defended Parāmartha's teaching that there was a ninth consciousness called the "pure consciousness" (amalavijñāna). This position had been rejected by Xuanzang and Kuiji.

Another student of Xuanzang, the Japanese monk Dōshō (道昭, 629–700 CE) brought the CWSL to Japan in 660, creating the doctrinal foundation for the Japanese Consciousness-only (Jp: Hossō) school at Nara's Gangōji Temple.

== English translations ==
The Chinese scholar and philosopher Wei Tat translated the Chéng Wéishì Lùn into English for the first time in Hong Kong in 1973. He drew on various Chinese and Western sources for his research, especially the French translation of the CWSL by Louis de La Vallée Poussin. Poussin's translation also included numerous annotations and passages from Kuiji's commentary.

Francis Cook made a new English translation for the Numata Center for Buddhist Translation and Research's Taishō Tripiṭaka translation effort.

In 2017, a new translation closely based on Louis de La Vallée Poussin's French (along with many annotations) was published by Motilal Banarsidass as Vijñapti-mātratā-siddhi: A Commentary (Chéng Wéishì Lùn) on Vasubandhu's Triṃśikā by Xuanzang. It is the work of Lodrö Sangpo, Migme Chödrön and A. L. Mayer.

== See also ==
- East Asian Yogācāra
- Kuiji

== Bibliography ==
- Lusthaus, Dan (2003). Buddhist Phenomenology: A Philosophical Investigation of Yogacara Buddhism and the Ch'eng Wei-shih Lun, Routledge Critical Studies in Buddhism, ISBN 0415406102
- Schmithausen, Lambert (2015). "On the Problem of the External World in the Ch’eng wei shih lun", International Institute for Buddhist Studies
- Sharf, Robert (2016). "Is Yogacara Phenomenology? Some Evidence from the Cheng Weishi Lun". Journal of Indian Philosophy 44 (4), 777–807
- Jiang, Tao (2005). "Alayavijnana" and the problematic of continuity in the "Cheng Wei-shih Lun", Journal of Indian Philosophy 33 (3), 243–284 JSTOR 23496968 (subscription required)
