= Japanese Language and Literature =

- Discipline: Japanese language and literature
- Language: English
- Edited by: Hiroshi Nara

Publication details
- Former name(s): Journal of the Association of Teachers of Japanese
- History: 1966-present
- Publisher: D-Scribe Digital Publishing for The Association of Teachers of Japanese (United States)
- Frequency: Biannually

Standard abbreviations
- ISO 4: Jpn. Lang. Lit.

Indexing
- ISSN: 1536-7827
- LCCN: 2001229208
- JSTOR: 15367827
- OCLC no.: 644326510

Links
- Journal homepage

Japanese Language and Literature is a biannual peer-reviewed academic journal published by The Association of Teachers of Japanese. It was established in 1966 as the Journal of the Association of Teachers of Japanese, obtaining its current title in 2001. The journal covers the pedagogy of Japanese language teaching, Japanese linguistics, and Japanese literature. It also carries reviews of books germane to its main areas of interest, including textbooks, grammars, and vocabulary guides, and extensive, annotated, bibliographical coverage of both Ph.D. and, more recently, M.A. theses. The editor-in-chief is Hiroshi Nara (University of Pittsburgh).
