= Kuiji =

Chinese monk and disciple of Xuanzang (632–682)

Kuiji 窺基
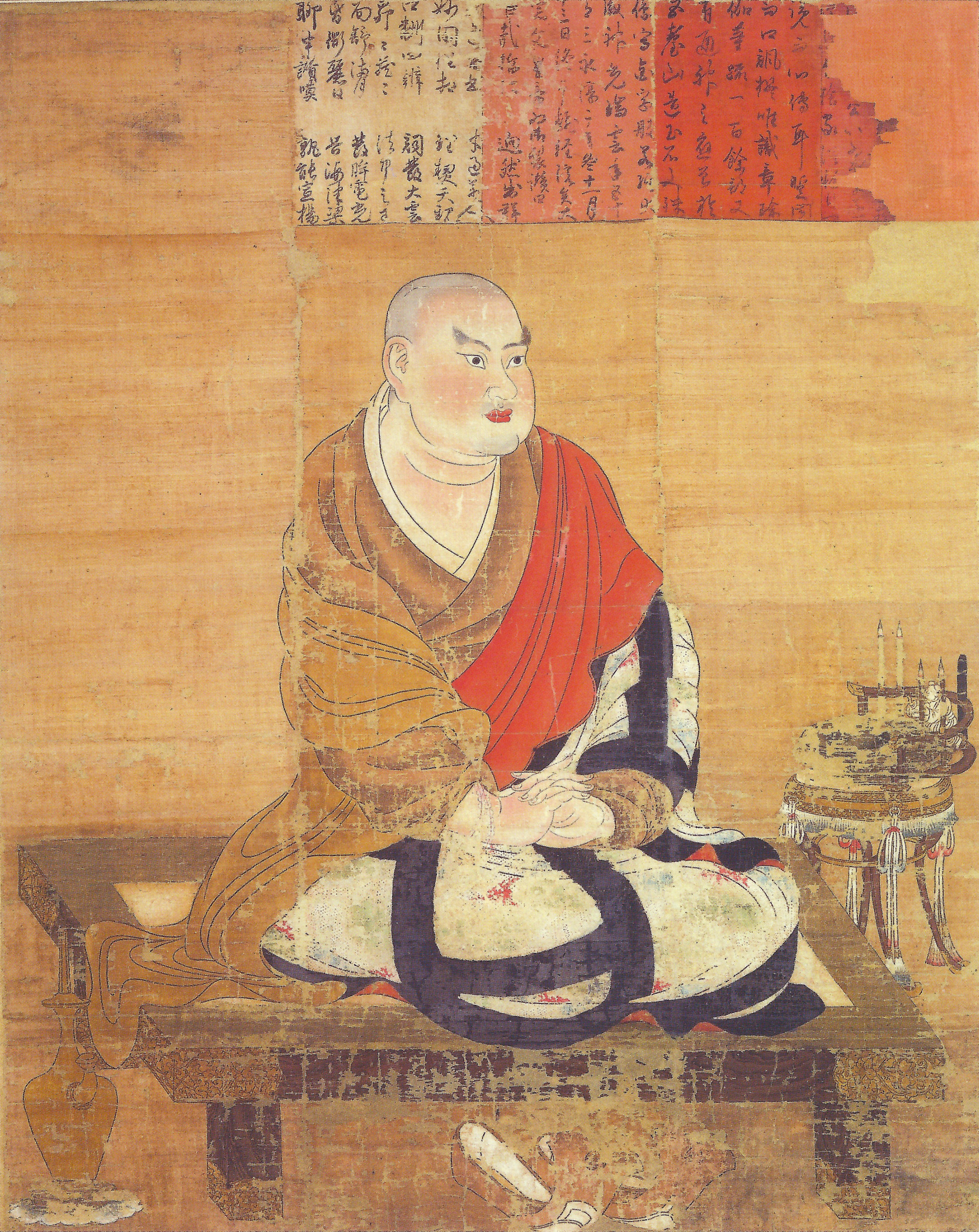
- Portrait of Jion Daishi (Kuiji), colour on silk, at Yakushi-ji (NT)

Personal life
- Born: Yuchi (surname) Hongdao (style); 632 Chang'an, China
- Died: 682 (aged 50)
- Parents: Yuchi Jingzong (father); Pei (mother's surname) (mother)

Religious life
- Religion: Buddhism
- School: East Asian Yogācāra

Senior posting
- Teacher: Xuanzang

Kuiji

Chinese name
- Traditional Chinese: 窺基
- Simplified Chinese: 窥基
Transcriptions
Standard Mandarin
- Hanyu Pinyin: Kuījī
- Bopomofo: ㄎㄨㄟ ㄐㄧ
- Wade–Giles: K‘uei^{1}-chi^{1}
- IPA: [kʰwéɪ.tɕí]
Hakka
- Pha̍k-fa-sṳ: Khûi-kî
Yue: Cantonese
- Yale Romanization: Kwāigēi
- Jyutping: kwai1 gei1
- IPA: [kʷʰɐj˥.kej˥]
Southern Min
- Hokkien POJ: Khui-ki

Korean name
- Hangul: 규기
- Hanja: 窺基
Transcriptions
- Revised Romanization: Gyugi
- McCune–Reischauer: Kyugi

Japanese name
- Kanji: 窺基
- Kana: きき
Transcriptions
- Romanization: Kiki

Kuiji (窺基; Kuījī; 632–682), also known as Ji (Chinese: 基), an exponent of Yogācāra, was a Chinese monk and a prominent disciple of Xuanzang. His posthumous name was Ci'en Dashi (慈恩大師; 'Master Ci'en'), the Great Teacher of Cien Monastery, after the Daci'en Temple or Great Monastery of Compassionate Grace, which was located in Chang'an, the main capital of the Tang Dynasty. The Giant Wild Goose Pagoda was built in Daci'en Temple in 652. According to biographies, he was sent to the imperial translation bureau headed by Xuanzang, from whom he later would learn Sanskrit, Abhidharma, and Yogācāra.

Kuiji collaborated closely with Xuanzang on the Cheng weishi lun, a redacted translation of commentaries on Vasubandhu's Triṃśikā-vijñaptimātratā. Kuiji's commentaries on the former text, the Cheng weishi lun shuji, along with his original treatise on Yogācāra, the Dasheng Fayuan yilin chang (大乘法苑義林章; "Essays on the Forest of Meanings in the Mahāyāna Dharma Garden") became foundations of the Faxiang School, the dominant school of Yogācāra thought in East Asia. He is accordingly considered the founder of this school which differed notably from Paramārtha's earlier Chinese Yogācāra system. Kuiji is also known for his commentaries on Dharmapāla's Yogācāra philosophy.

== Works ==
=== Essays ===
- Forest of Meanings in the Mahāyāna Dharma Garden (大乘法苑義林章 Taishō no. 1861 in Vol. 45)

=== Mahayana Sutra Commentaries ===
- Commentary on the Amitâbha Sutra (阿彌陀經疏, Taishō 1757 in Vol. 37)
- Explanation of the Sūtra on the Contemplation of the Bodhisattva Maitreyaʼs Ascent to Rebirth in Tuṣita Heaven (觀彌勒上生兜率天經賛, Taishō 1772)
- Commentary on the Diamond Sūtra (金剛般若經賛述, Taishō no. 1700)
- Commentary on the Heart Sūtra (般若波羅蜜多心經幽贊, Taishō no. 1710 in Vol. 33. Translated by Shih and Lusthaus 2006)
- Commentary on the Lotus Sūtra (妙法蓮華經玄賛, Taishō no. 1723 in Vol. 34, "Profound Panegyric to the Lotus Sūtra")
- Commentary on the Vimalakīrtinirdeśa-sūtra (說無垢稱經疏, Taishō no. 1782 in Vol. 38)

=== Pramana ===
- Great Commentary on the Nyayapravesa (因明入正理論疏, Taishō 1840 in Vol. 44)

=== Commentaries on Yogacara treatises ===
- Cheng weishi lun shuji (成唯識 論述記; Taishō no. 1830, vol. 43, 229a-606c), a commentary on Xuanzang's Cheng weishi lun
- Madhyānta-vibhāga (辯中邊論述記, Taishō no. 1835 in Vol. 44)
- Sthiramati's Commentary on Asaṅga's Abhidharmasamuccaya (雜集論述記)
- Vasubandhu's Twenty Verses (Viṃśatikā) (唯識二十論述記)
- Vasubandhu's One Hundred Dharmas Treatise (大乘百法明門論解, Taishō no. 1836 in Vol. 44)
- Yogācārabhūmi (瑜伽師地論略纂, Taishō no. 1829 in Vol. 43)
