= Maitreya =

Future Buddha in Buddhist eschatology

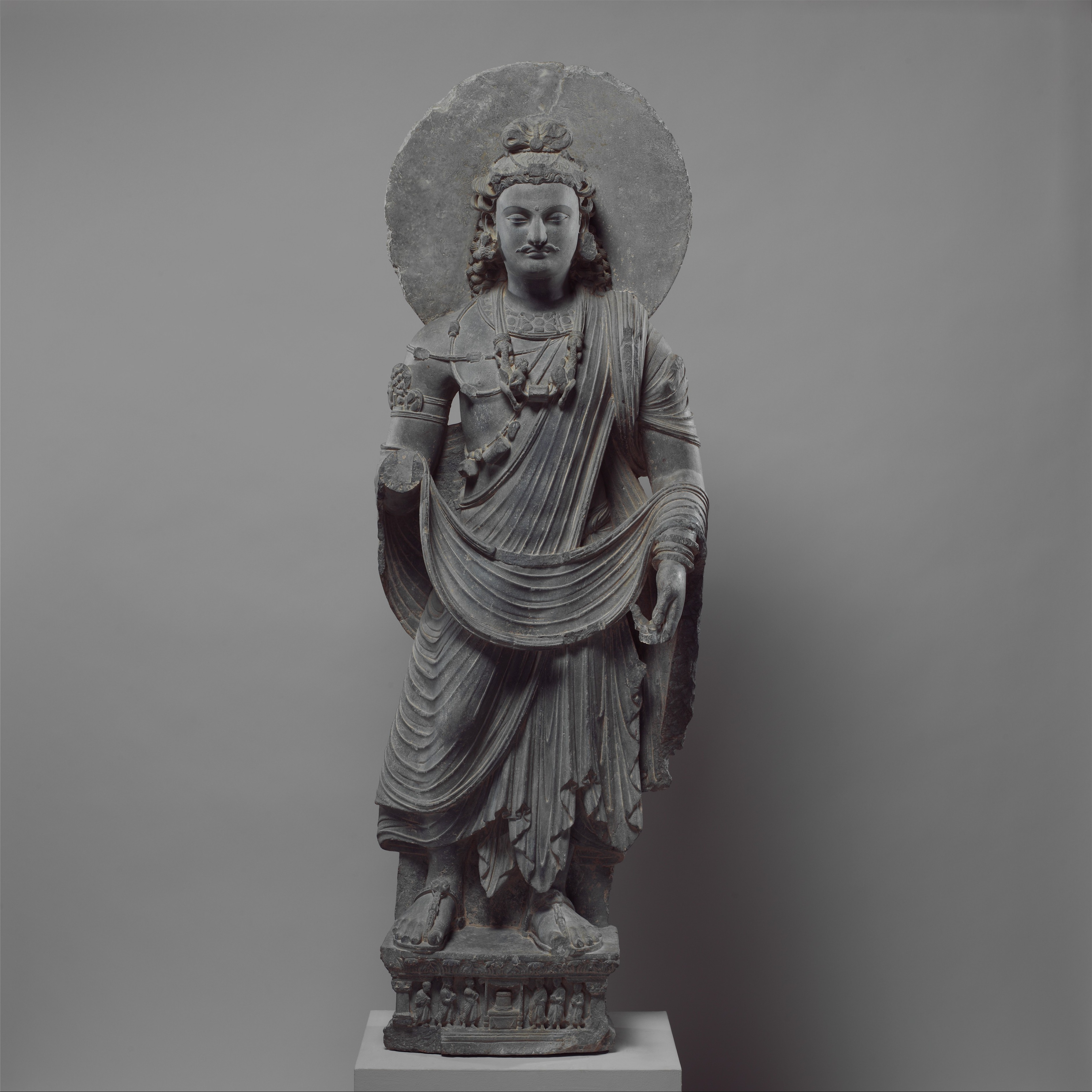
- Greco-Buddhist statue of Maitreya, Gandhara, c. 3rd century
- Sanskrit: मैत्रेय (Maitreya)
- Pāli: मेत्तेय्य (Metteyya)
- Burmese: အရိမေတ္တေယျမြတ်စွာဘုရား
- Chinese: 彌勒菩薩 弥勒菩萨 (Pinyin: Mílè Púsa)
- Japanese: 弥勒如来(みろくにょらい) (romaji: Miroku Nyorai)
- Karen: မဲၣ်တယါ ဘူးဒး (Mehtuhyah Boodah)
- Khmer: សិអារ្យមេត្រី, អរិយមេត្តយ្យ
- Korean: 미륵보살 彌勒菩薩 (RR: Mireuk Bosal)
- Mongolian: ᠮᠠᠢᠳᠠᠷᠢ; Майдар; SASM/GNC: Maidari
- Shan: ဢရီႉမိတ်ႈတေႇယႃႉ
- Sinhala: මෛත්‍රී බුදුන් (Maithri Budun)
- Thai: พระศรีอริยเมตไตรย (RTGS: Phra Si Ariya Mettrai)
- Tibetan: བྱམས་པ་ (Wylie: byams pa) (THL: Jampa) བྱམས་པ་མགོན་པོ་ (Wylie: byams pa'i mgon po) (THL: Jampé Gönpo)
- Vietnamese: Di lặc Bồ Tát

Information
- Venerated by: Mahayana, Theravada, Vajrayana
- Attributes: Compassion and Kindness

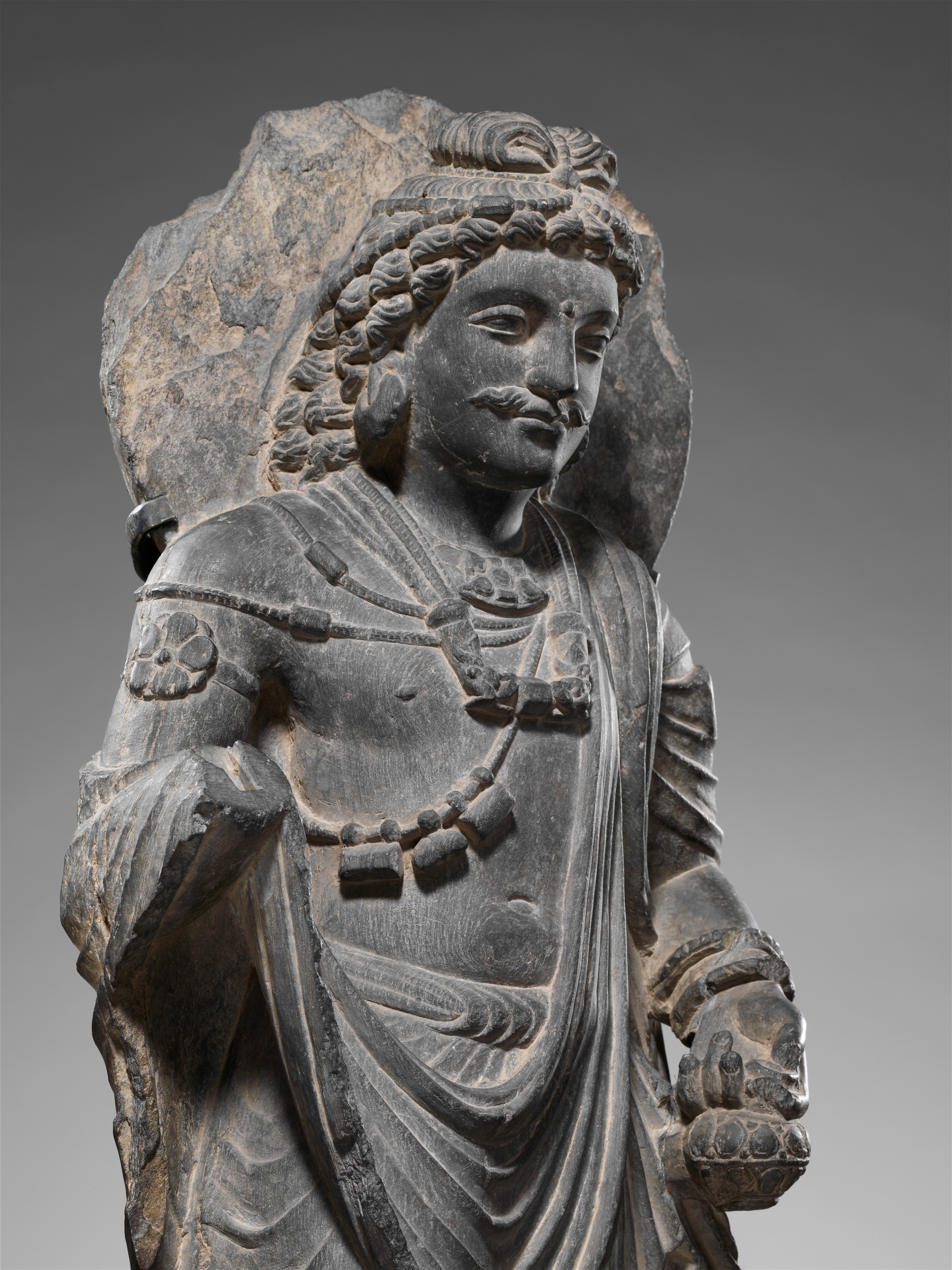
Schist Greco-Buddhist statue of Maitreya, Gandhara, c. 3rd century

Maitreya (Sanskrit) or Metteyya (Pali) is a bodhisattva who is regarded as the future Buddha of this world in all schools of Buddhism, prophesied to become Maitreya Buddha or Metteyya Buddha. In some Buddhist literature, such as the Amitabha Sutra and the Lotus Sutra, he is also referred to as Ajitā (Invincible, Unconquerable). In Tibetan Buddhism he is known as the "Lord of Love" or the "Noble Loving One" (Pakpa Jampa). The root of his name is the Sanskrit word maitrī (Pali: metta; meaning friendliness, loving-kindness). The name Maitreya is also related to the Indo-Iranian name Mitra. In Hinduism, Maitreya is prophesied to be the king of Shambala, which is also prophesied to be the birthplace of the Kalki Avatar.

In all branches of Buddhism, Maitreya is viewed as the direct successor of Gautama Buddha. As the fifth and final Buddha of the current kalpa (eon), Maitreya's teachings will be focused around re-establishing the Buddha's Dharma on Earth. According to scriptures, Maitreya's teachings will be similar to those of Gautama (Shakyamuni). The arrival of Maitreya is prophesied to occur during an era of decline when the teachings of Gautama Buddha have been disregarded or obliviated.

Despite many religious figures and spiritual leaders claiming to be Maitreya throughout history, diverse Buddhist sects insist that these are false claims, while underscoring that Maitreya has yet to appear as a Buddha on the grounds that the Buddha's teachings have not been disregarded. Traditional Buddhists believe that Maitreya currently resides in Tushita heaven. However, Maitreya is not inaccessible, and various Buddhists throughout history have also claimed to have been visited by Maitreya, to have had visions of him, and to have received teachings by him. As such, Mahayana Buddhists traditionally consider Maitreya to be the founder of the Yogacara tradition through his revelation of various scriptures like the Mahāyānasūtrālamkārakā, and the Madhyāntavibhāga.

== Sources ==
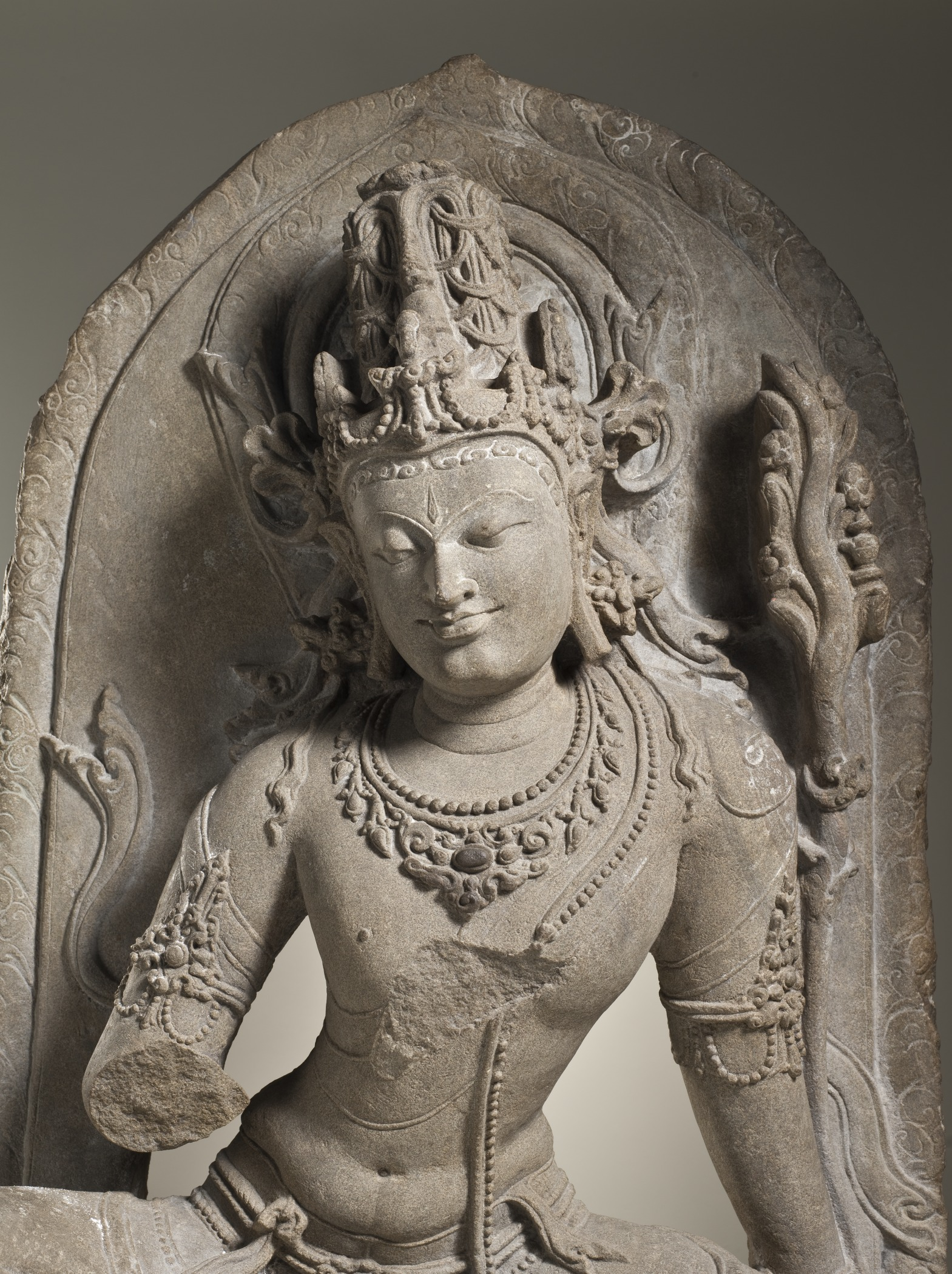
11th century Maitreya, Bihar, India

The name Maitreya is derived from the Sanskrit word maitrī "friendship", which is in turn derived from the noun mitra, signifying "friend". The Pali form Metteyya is mentioned in the Cakkavatti-Sīhanāda Sutta (Digha Nikaya 26) of the Pāli Canon, and also in chapter 28 of the Buddhavamsa. Maitreya's prophecy also appears in other texts like the Māhavastu, Lalitavistara, the Mūlasarvāstivāda-vinaya and the Divyāvadāna.

Due to their similar names, some modern scholars like Przyluski, Lamotte, and Levi have speculated that inspiration for Maitreya may have come from ancient Indo-Iranian deities like Mitra and the future Zoroastrian savior figure of the Saoshyant. David Alan Scott points out many differences in their artistic portrayals (including in the same geographic region) and discrepancies, suggesting that this direct link is unlikely. He also points out the roots of Maitreya in the earliest Buddhist texts. Scott does point out that both deities are personifications of the virtue of friendship, so they do have that in common (maitrī).

=== Mahayana sutras ===
There are many Mahāyāna sūtras which describe and discuss the bodhisattva Maitreya. He appears as a supporting character in several important Mahāyāna sūtras such as the Lotus Sutra, Vimalakirti Sutra, the Golden Light, the King of Samadhis Sutra, and the Perfection of Wisdom in Eight Thousand Lines.

In the Gaṇḍavyūha Sutra meanwhile, Maitreya has an entire chapter in which he preaches the Dharma to the pilgrim Sudhana in one hundred and twenty one verses. Then Sudhana is allowed to enter Maitreya's palace (Vairocanakutalamkara-garbha), where he has a grand vision of the entirety of Maitreya's bodhisattva career.

In addition, there are also several Mahāyāna sutras which focus specifically on Maitreya, his teachings and future activity. Some key Maitreya sutras in the Chinese canon are the following:

- Sutra on the Descending Birth of Maitreya (T.453:421a:421a–423c), translated by Dharmarakṣa (230?–316);
- Sutra on the Descending Birth of Maitreya (T.454:423c– 425c), translated by Kumārajīva (344–413);
- Sutra on Maitreya Becoming Buddha (T.456:428b–434b), translated by Kumārajīva (344–413);
- The Great Vehicle Sūtra Called "Petitioned by Noble Maitreya" (ārya maitriya paripṛhccha nāma mahāyāna sūtra), translated by Bodhiruci
- Sutra on Maitreya's Descending Birth and Becoming Buddha (T.455:426a–428b), translated by Yijing (635– 713);
- Sutra on the Time of Maitreya's Arrival (T.457:434b–435a), translator unknown
- Sutra on the Visualization of Maitreya Bodhisattva's Ascending Birth in Tuṣita Heaven (T.452:418b–420c), translated by Juqu Jing- sheng (?–464)

The Tibetan Buddhist canon meanwhile contains the following Maitreya sutras:

- Maitreya-mahāsiṃhanāda (Great Lion's Roar of Maitreya)
- Maitreyaparipṛcchā (Questions of Maitreya, Ratnakuta section)
- Maitreyaparipṛcchādharmāṣṭa (Questions of Maitreya on eight dharmas)
- Maitreyaparipṛcchā (Questions of Maitreya, General sutra section)
- Maitreyaprasthāna (Maitreya's Setting Out)
- Maitreya-vyākaraṇa (Prophecy of Maitreya)
- Ārya-maitri-pratijñā-nāma-dhāraṇī

=== Other literature ===
Maitreya also appears in other literary works. The Maitreyasamitināṭaka was an extensive Buddhist play in pre-Islamic Central Asia (c. 8th century). The Maitreyavyakarana (a poem in śatakam form) in Central Asia and the Anagatavamsa of South India also mention him.

=== Archeology and art ===
In the Greco-Buddhist art of Gandhara, in the first centuries CE in present-day northwestern Pakistan and eastern Afghanistan, Maitreya was the most popular figure to be represented along with Gautama Buddha. Numerous sculptures of Maitreya have been found in Greater Gandhara from the Kushan Empire period (30–375 CE). He also appears in Mathura to a lesser extent. Maitreya is already depicted at Sanchi before the Kushan period. But art depicting him becomes much more numerous during the Kushan era, when his cult seems to have grown in popularity.

In 4th-6th century China, Buddhist artisans saw Shakyamuni and Maitreya as interchangeable, which indicates that the iconography of the two figures were not fully established at an early date. An example is the stone sculpture found in the Qingzhou cache dedicated to Maitreya in 529 CE as recorded in the inscription (currently in the Qingzhou Museum, Shandong). The religious belief of Maitreya apparently developed around the same time as that of Amitābha, as early as the 3rd century CE.

=== Artistic depictions ===
Maitreya is often depicted standing or sitting on a throne. He is often represented as a northern Indian nobleman or prince with a full head of hair, fine flowing robes, and jewels. Gandharan style images present him with a distinctive long hair loop folded at the top of the head.

Maitreya is often depicted carrying a vase or bottle (kamaṇḍalu), an element which goes back to the Gandharan sculptures and which he shares with depictions of the deity Brahma (along with the hair loop). Because of this, some scholars argue that the water bottle and hair loop are symbols of his brahminical origins, and indeed, some stories depict Maitreya as being born to a Human family during his last life. Maitreya is also often shown in a heaven realm, indicating his current location in Tushita.

In Indian symbolism, the kamaṇḍalu pot symbolizes immortality (amrita), fertility, life, and wealth. In Buddhism, the similar pūrṇa-kumbha (full bottle) also symbolizes "auspicious abundance", wisdom, health, longevity, wealth, prosperity, and the Buddha's infinite quality of teaching the Dharma. In Tibetan Buddhism, it is termed a bumpa (wisdom urn, ritual vase).

== Buddhist Maitreya beliefs ==
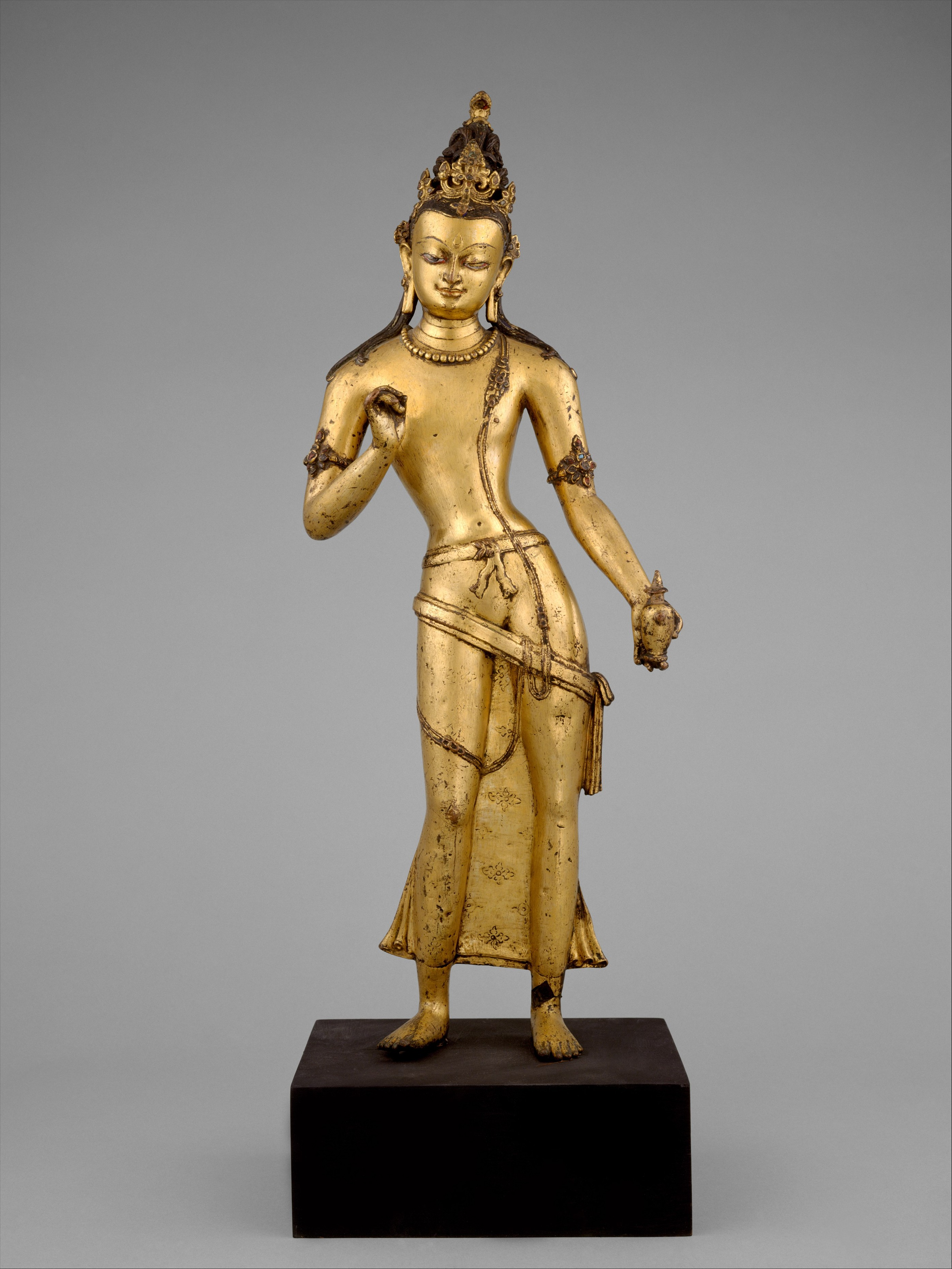
Nepalese Maitreya sculpture, c. 11th century

=== Types of Maitreya myths ===
According to Jan Nattier, there are four main types of the Maitreya myth which we find throughout the history of Buddhism. The typology is based around when and how a devotee expected to encounter the figure of Maitreya:

1. Here/now: In this version, a devotee expected to meet Maitreya on earth, during their present lifetime.
2. Here/later: A devotee expected to meet Maitreya on earth at some point after their death, during a future lifetime, perhaps when Maitreya attains Buddhahood and founds a new community. This is the most common and standard myth in which Maitreya's enlightenment is a future event devotees hope to be present for.
3. There/now: In visionary forms of the Maitreya myth, devotees attempted to encounter Maitreya in a vision of his court in Tushita heaven, or to literally travel there by some means (e.g. the story of Asanga's encounter).
4. There/later: A common wish among Maitreya devotees was to be reborn in Maitreya's Tushita palace or "inner court", which is his current Pure land.

=== Future coming of Maitreya ===
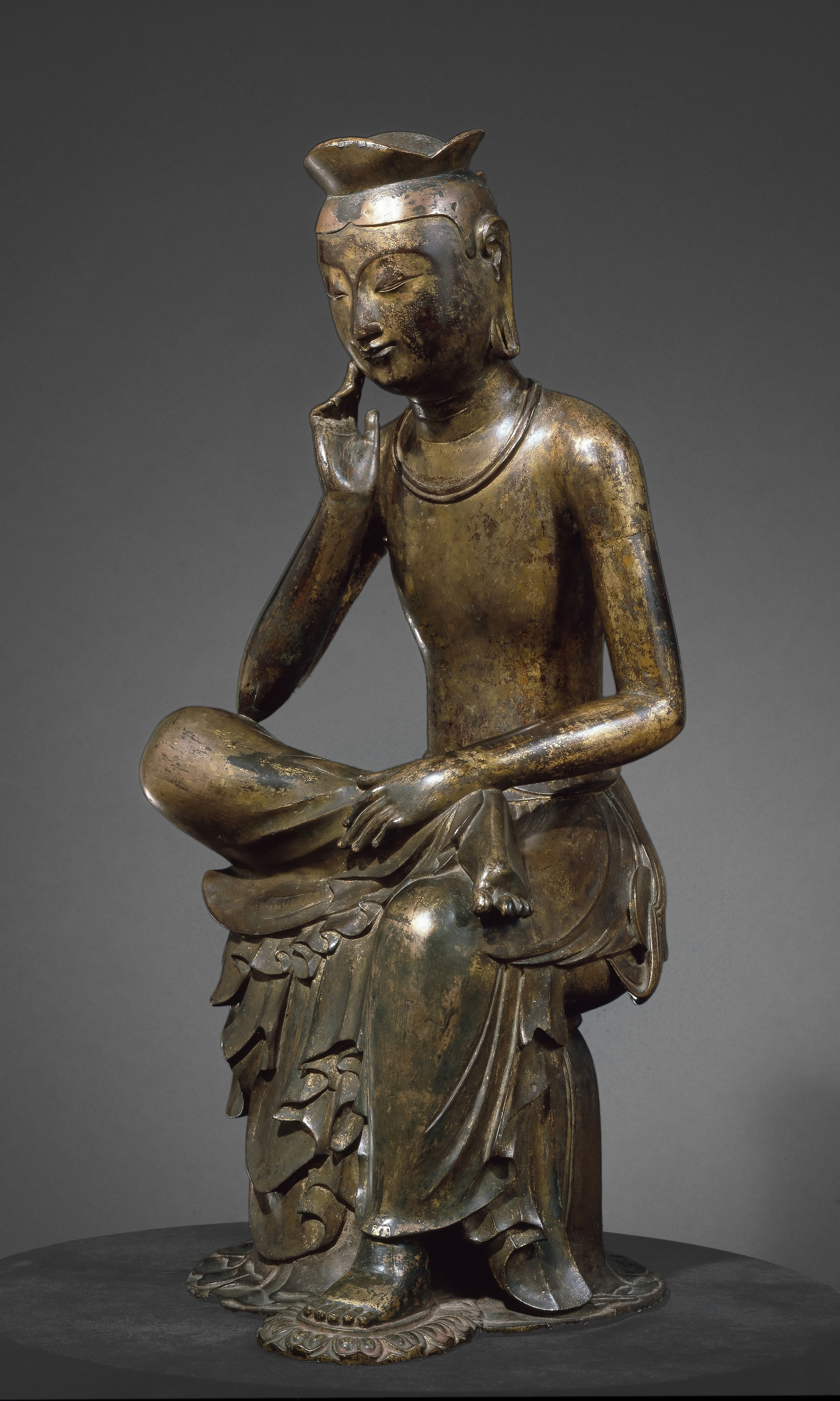
Sitting gilded bronze Maitreya, c. late 6th-early 7th century, National Museum of Korea

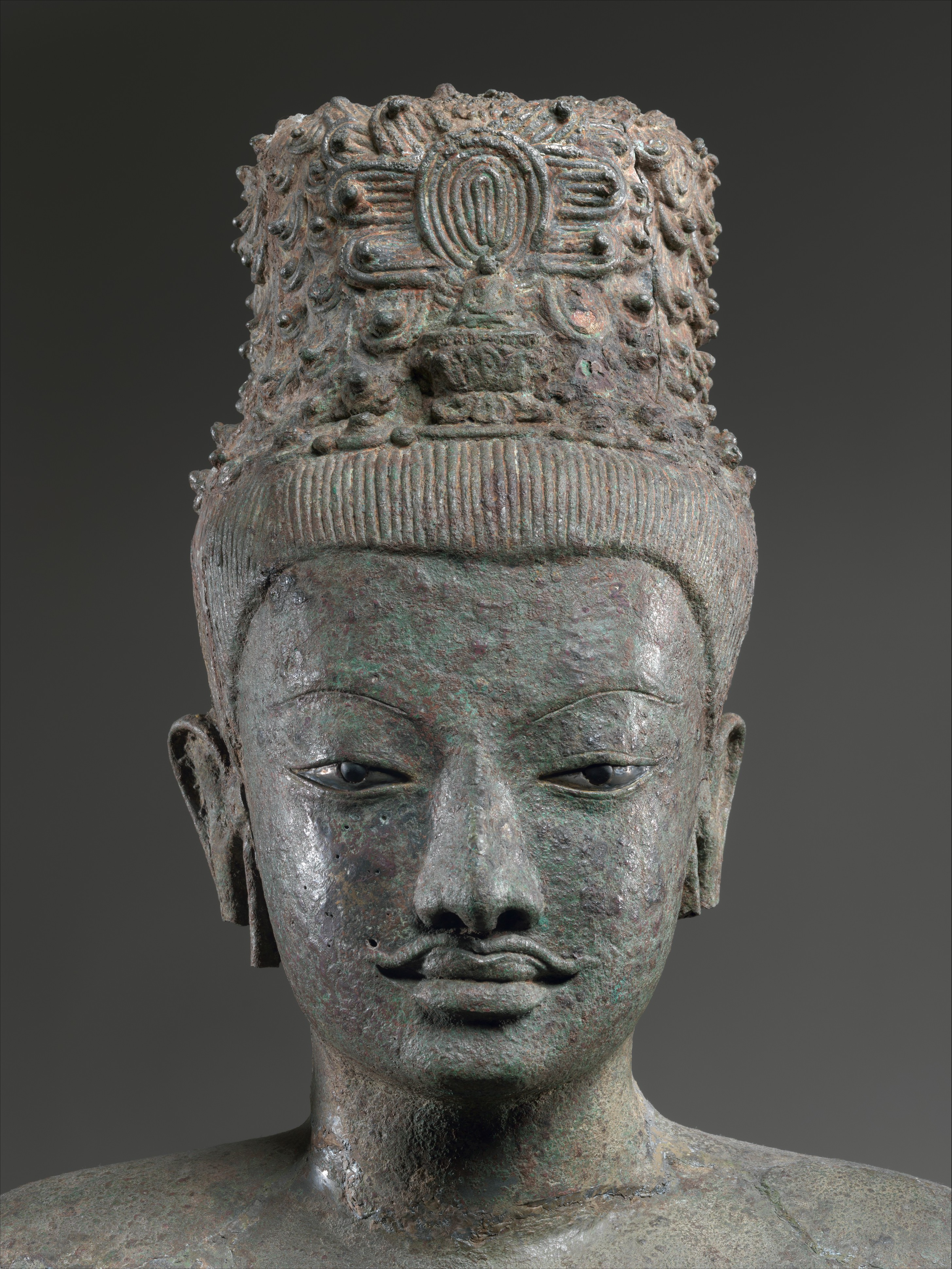
Head of a Thai four armed Maitreya, Northeastern Thailand, second quarter of the 8th century

In all Buddhist traditions, Maitreya is prophesied to be the next Buddha who will arise in this world. He will attain Buddhahood far in the future (5,670,000,000 years from now). Since attaining enlightenment is thought to be much more likely while studying under a living Buddha, many Buddhists have hoped to meet Maitreya and train under him. As Buddhist studies scholar Alan Spongberg writes, Maitreya "came to represent a hope for the future, a time when all human beings could once again enjoy the spiritual and physical environment most favorable to enlightenment and the release from worldly suffering". The Maitreya legend has provided a positive view of the future for all Buddhist cultures, who have adapted and expressed the prophetic myth in different ways.

According to Buddhist tradition, each kalpa (a cosmic period lasting millions of years) has several Buddhas. The previous kalpa was the vyuhakalpa (glorious aeon), and the present kalpa is called the bhadrakalpa (auspicious aeon). The Seven Buddhas of Antiquity (saptatathāgata) are seven Buddhas which bridge the last kalpa and the present kalpa, they begin with Vipassī and end (so far) with Gautama (Shakyamuni). Maitreya is thus the eighth Buddha in this line.

According to traditional Buddhist sources Maitreya's advent is not imminent and instead will happen millions of years in the future. In spite of this, Buddhist believers can hope to accumulate good karma so that when the time comes, they will be reborn to meet the future Buddha Maitreya and reach enlightenment under him. Scriptures which describe the future coming of Maitreya also describe the paradise like conditions of the world during Maitreya's time. His coming is said to usher in a "golden age" of religion and civilization. Buddhist scriptures do not exhort believers to work to bring about this golden age (what Nattier calls "active apocalypticism"). This might be due to the Buddhist view of the cyclical nature of time and history.

The cyclical nature of history is thus part of the Maitreya myth. Buddhists believe that there will come a time of Dharma decline in which social order and morality will decline and the human lifespan will also decline. There will be war, sickness and famine. The Buddha's Dharma will then be lost. After some time, the world will begin to improve again, and human lifespans will begin to increase. It is at the peak of this rise in goodness in the far future that Maitreya will arrive. As such, in the traditional Buddhist view, first there will be a period of decline, followed by a period of moral and social betterment. It is only then that Maitreya is expected to come. To be able to take part in this golden age, Buddhist devotees hoped to make enough good merit (through good deeds like giving and compassionate acts) which would condition their future rebirth.

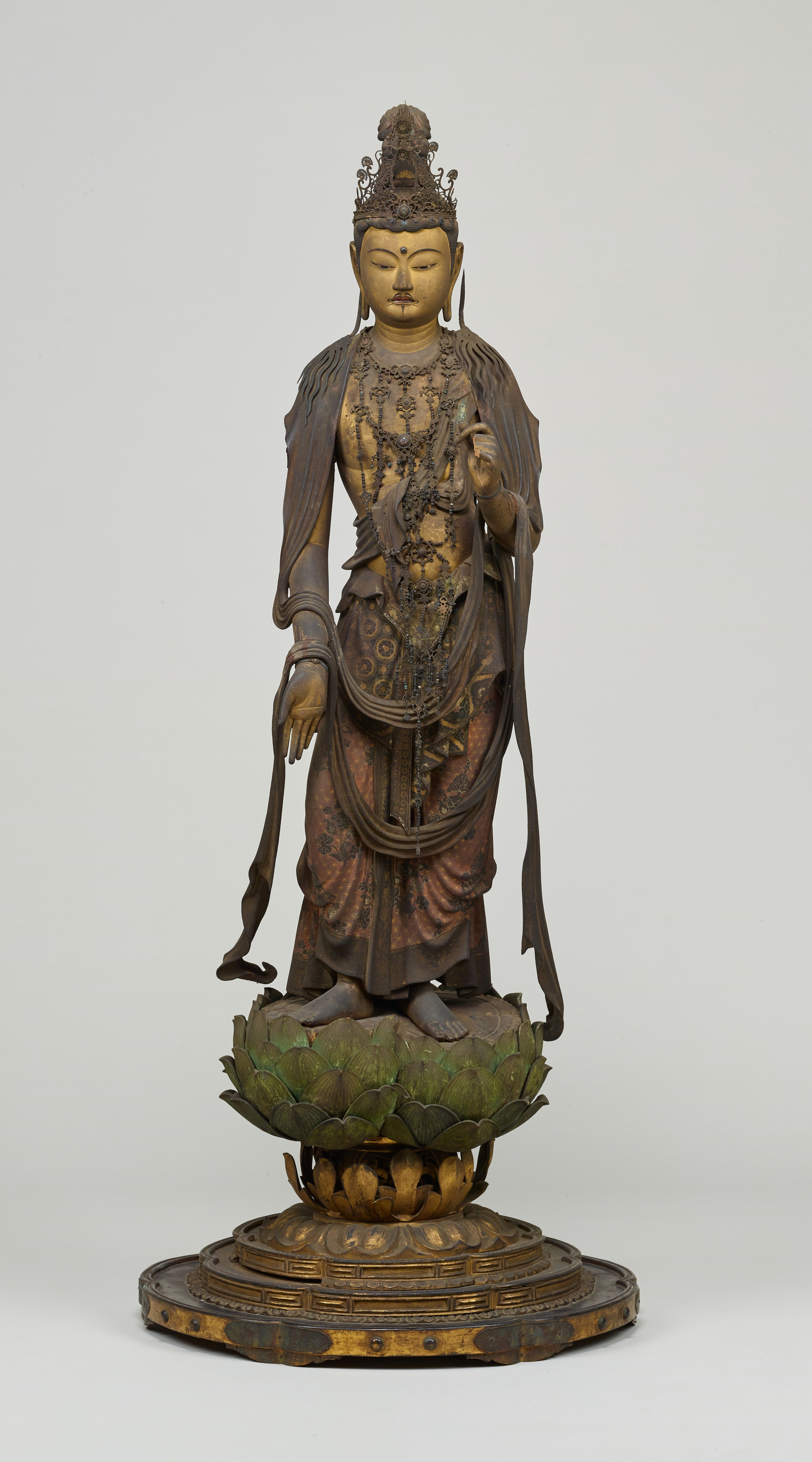
Maitreya, 13th century, Kamakura period, Tokyo National Museum, Important Cultural Property of Japan

One mention of the prophecy in the Maitreyavyākaraṇa states that gods, men and other beings:

Will lose their doubts, and the torrents of their cravings will be cut off: free from all misery they will manage to cross the ocean of becoming; and, as a result of Maitreya's teachings, they will lead a holy life. No longer will they regard anything as their own, they will have no possession, no gold or silver, no home, no relatives! But they will lead the holy life of oneness under Maitreya's guidance. They will have torn the net of the passions, they will manage to enter into trances, and theirs will be an abundance of joy and happiness, for they will lead a holy life under Maitreya's guidance.

Thus, many Buddhists throughout history have sought to develop the necessary merit to meet Maitreya on Earth during the life of his final Buddhahood. This includes many Theravada Buddhists. One famous Theravadin who expressed this wish was the Sinhalese king Duṭṭhagāmaṇī.

In Mahayana Buddhism, Buddhas preside over pure lands, such as Sukhavati. Once Maitreya becomes a Buddha, he will rule over the Ketumati pure land, an earthly paradise sometimes associated with the city of Varanasi (also known as Benares) in Uttar Pradesh, India, and in other descriptions, the kingdom of Shambhala.

=== Foretold biography ===
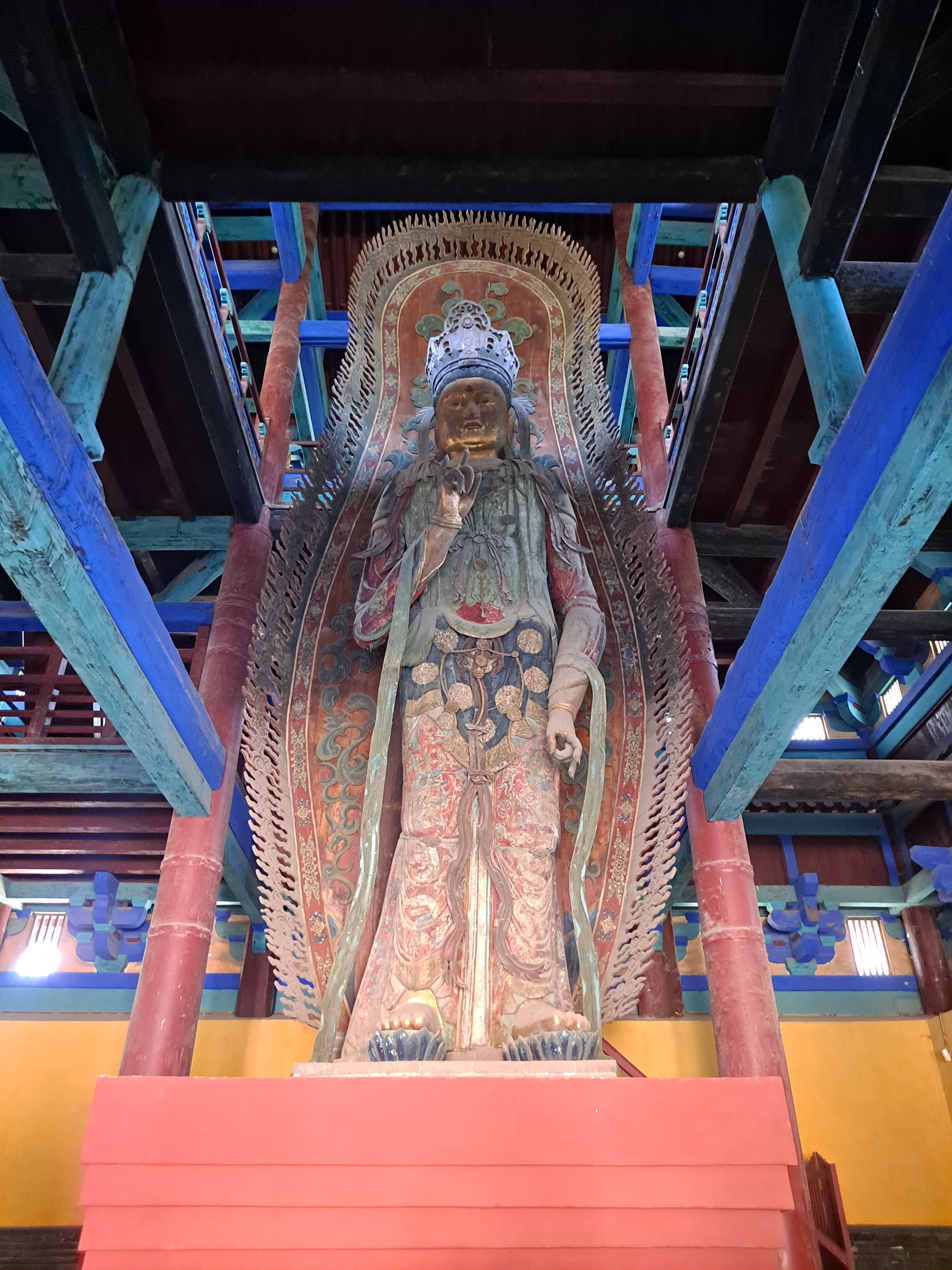
Song dynasty (960-1279) statue of Maitreya at Longxing Temple in Hebei, China.

Various Buddhist sources give details about Maitreya's birth, family and country. According to the Cakkavatti Sutta: The Wheel-turning Emperor (Digha Nikaya 26), Maitreya Buddha will be born in a time when humans will live to an age of eighty thousand years, in the city of Ketumatī, whose king will be the Cakkavattī (wheel-turning emperor) Sankha. Sankha will live in the palace where once dwelt King Mahāpanadā, but later he will give the palace away and will himself become a follower of Maitreya Buddha.

Maitreya will be born to the chief priest of Sankha, Brahmayu, and his wife Brahmavati. In some sources his family name is Maitreya and his first name is Ajita. Maitreya will live as a householder, have a son, and then renounce the world and achieve Buddhahood like Shakyamuni. In some accounts, Maitreya will meet Mahakasyapa, who has been in samadhi on top of mount Kukkutapada since the passing of Shakyamuni. According to some accounts, Mahakasyapa will then hand Shakyamuni's robe to Maitreya.

Buddhist texts from several traditions say that beings in Maitreya's time will be much bigger than during the time of Sakyamuni. To these gigantic beings, Buddha's robe barely covers two fingers and a modern human appears insect sized. Some sources state that Maitreya will be 88 cubits (132 feet, 40 meters) tall and will live for 88,000 years. Like Maṅgala Buddha, his rays will make people hard to distinguish between day and night. His teachings will preserve for the next 180,000 years. According to the commentary of Anāgatavamsa, his teaching will last for 360,000 years.

=== In Tushita heaven ===
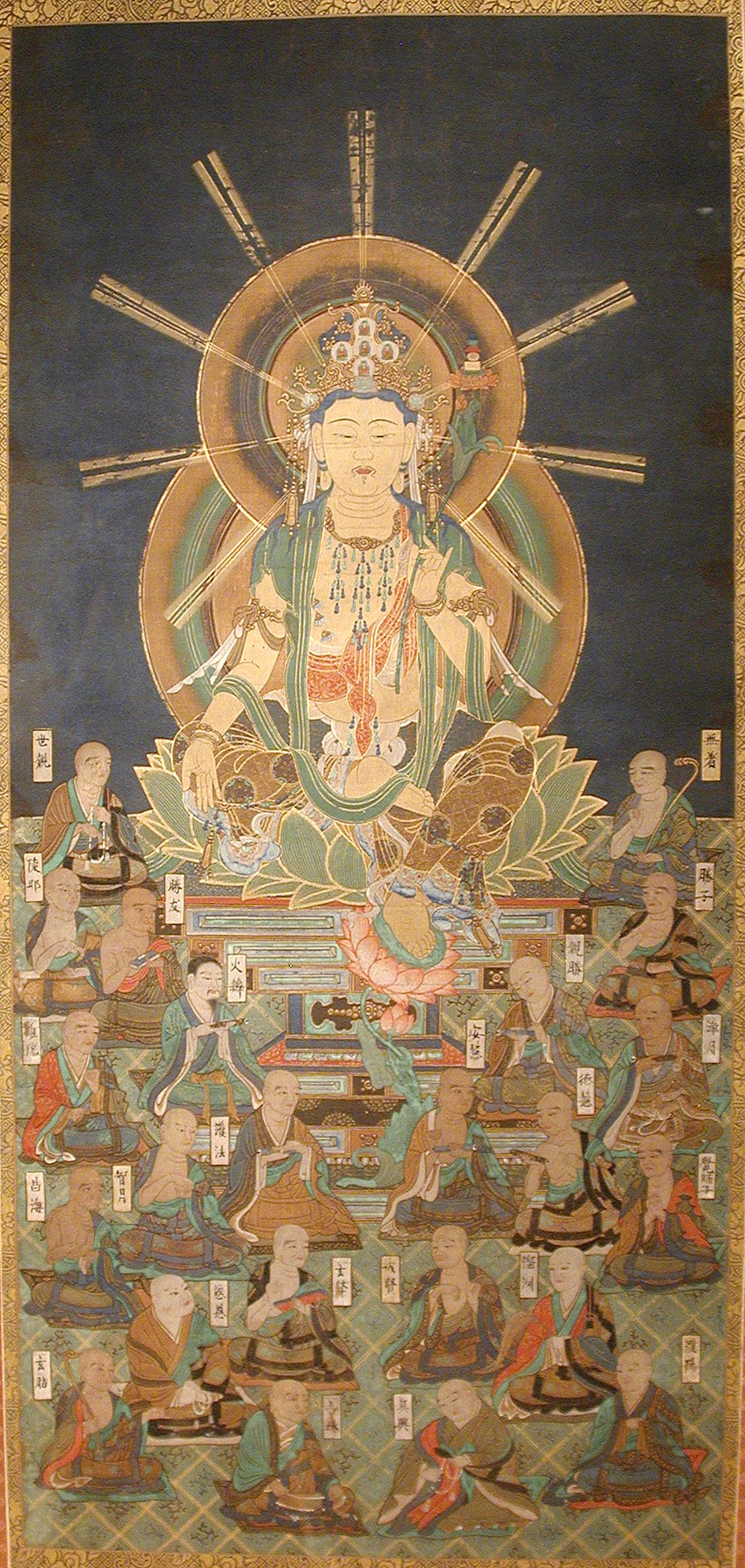
Maitreya depicted as the founder of the Hosso (Japanese Yogacara) school, c. 16th century

Buddhists believe that Maitreya is currently a spiritually advanced bodhisattva (a being who is practicing the path towards full Buddhahood) in Tuṣita heaven where he will remain until it is the right time for him to descend to earth to attain Buddhahood.

Maitreya currently resides in a palace at the center of Tuṣita Heaven (Pāli: Tusita). Gautama Buddha also lived here before he was born into the world as all bodhisattvas live in the Tuṣita Heaven before they descend to the human realm to become Buddhas. Though the concept of the bodhisattva is different in Theravada and Mahayana Buddhism, both traditions of Buddhism share a belief in Maitreya bodhisattva as the current regent of the Buddha's Dharma in Tusita.

Many Buddhists throughout history have cultivated merit through good deeds in order to be reborn in Tusita and meet Maitreya bodhisattva there in their next life. This may be combined with the wish to descend back down to earth as part of Maitreya's future entourage. Mahayana Buddhists such as Dao'an, Xuanzang, Yjing, and other masters of East Asian Yogacara, have expressed devotion for Maitreya and have sought to be reborn in his pure land, the palace at the center of Tuṣita. One Theravada example is the legend of the monk Malaya-Mahadeva, who is said to have traveled to Tushita and met Maitreya according to the 11th century Rasavāhinī.

Modern figures like Xuyun, and Taixu have also expressed the wish to meet Maitreya in Tushita.

=== Revelations and manifestations ===
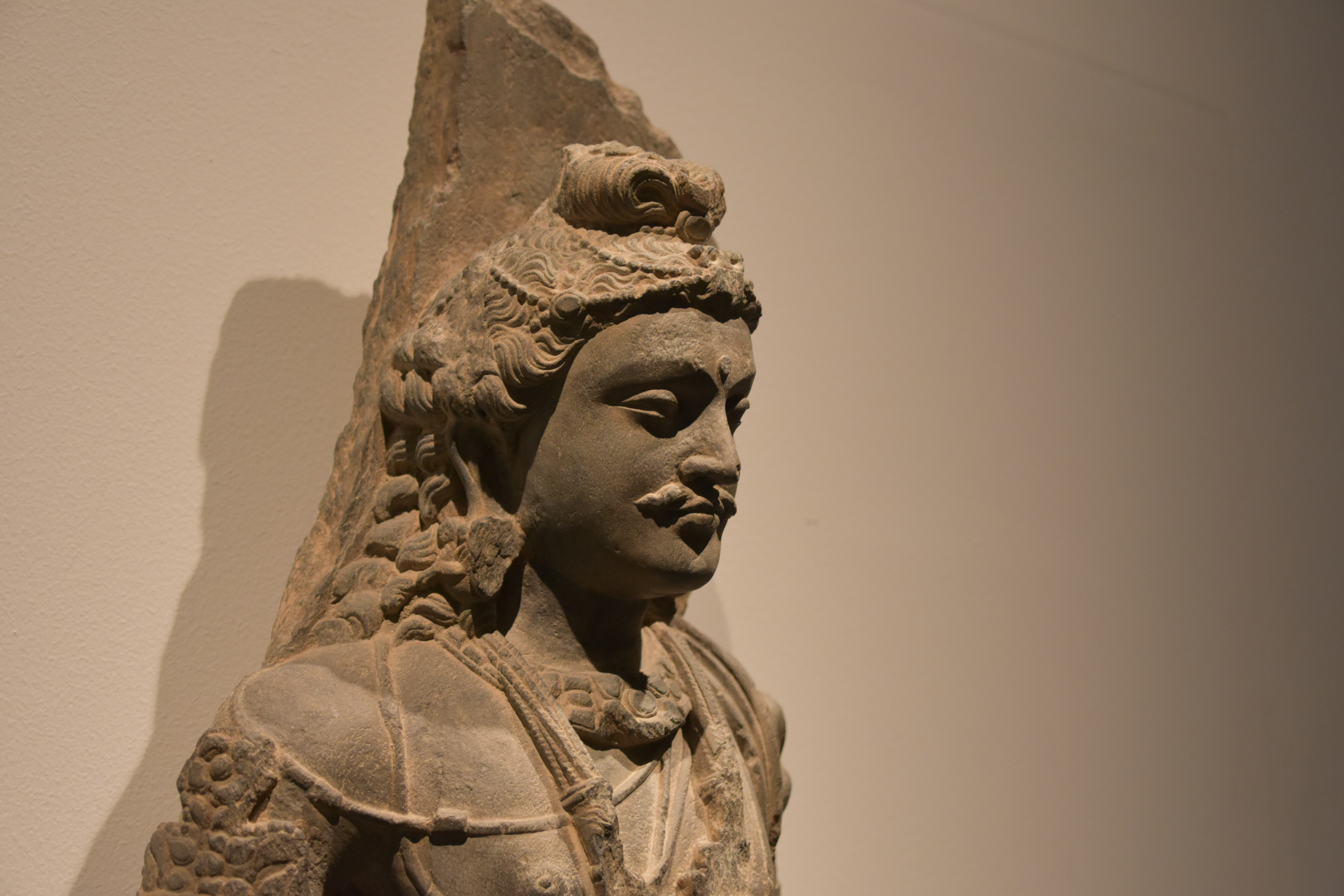
Bodhisattva Maitreya, Gandhara, 2nd-3rd cents., National Museum of Korea, Seoul

Maitreya is also believed by Buddhists to manifest "emanation bodies" (nirmanakayas) on earth in order to aid living beings and teach the Dharma. Chinese Buddhists consider the rotund monk Budai as an emanation of Maitreya in China. Buddhist yogis and scholars, like Dao'an, have also sought to receive visions, teachings, or guidance from Maitreya in this present life. Various stories are recorded of individuals ascending to meet Maitreya (through meditation and samadhi) or of Maitreya descending to meet them here on earth.

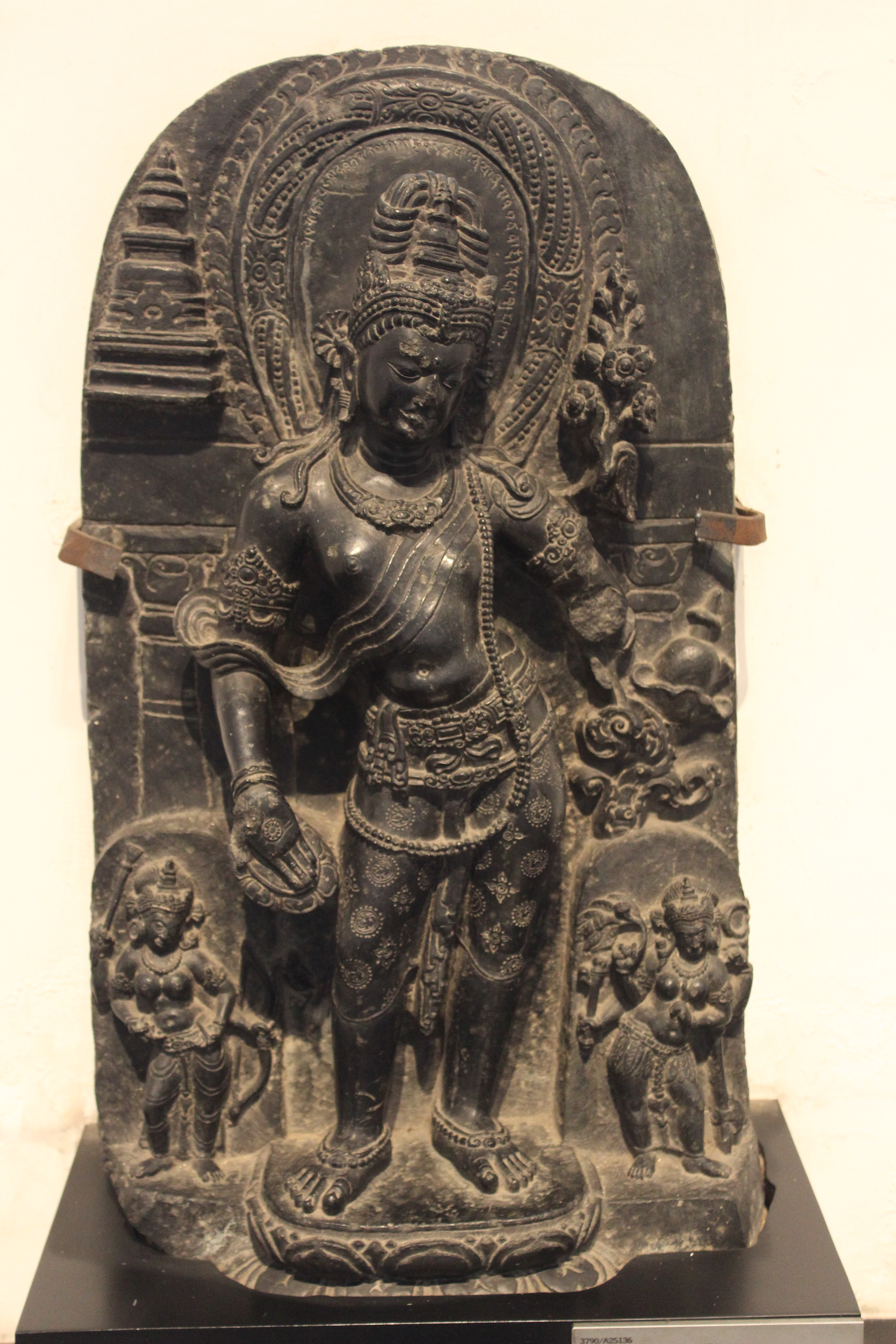
11th century CE, Basalt sculpture, Bihar

The most famous of these revelations in Mahayana Buddhism are five scriptures Maitreya is traditionally said to have revealed to the 4th century Indian Buddhist master Asanga. These texts are important in the Yogacara tradition and are considered to be part of the third turning within the Three Turnings of the Wheel of Dharma. They teach the "consciousness-only" idealist philosophy of Yogacara Buddhism.

Buddhist tradition associates Asanga (c. 4th century), one of the founders of the Yogacara school, with the bodhisattva Maitreya. According to traditional accounts, after twelve years of retreat and meditation, Asanga encountered a dying dog and treated his wounds by removing the maggots from the wounds to a piece of Asanga's own flesh. It was only after his act of love and compassion that Asanga had a vision of Maitreya, who turned out to be that very dying dog. Maitreya then took Asanga to the celestial realm of Tushita and transmitted to him several Buddhist scriptures (the so called "five dharmas of Maitreya").

The Chinese and Tibetan traditions disagree on which scriptures are included in the "Five Dharmas of Maitreya". In the Tibetan tradition, the five texts are: Mahāyānasūtrālamkārakārikā, ("The Adornment of Mahayana sutras"), Dharmadharmatāvibhāga ("Distinguishing Phenomena and Pure Being"), Madhyāntavibhāgakārikā ("Distinguishing the Middle and the Extremes"), Abhisamayalankara ( "Ornament for clear realization"), and the Ratnagotravibhaga (Exposition of the Jeweled lineage).

The Chinese tradition meanwhile maintains that the five revealed scriptures are: the Yogācārabhūmi, *Yogavibhāga [now lost], Mahāyānasūtrālamkārakā, Madhyāntavibhāga and the Vajracchedikākāvyākhyā.

== Mantras and dharanis ==
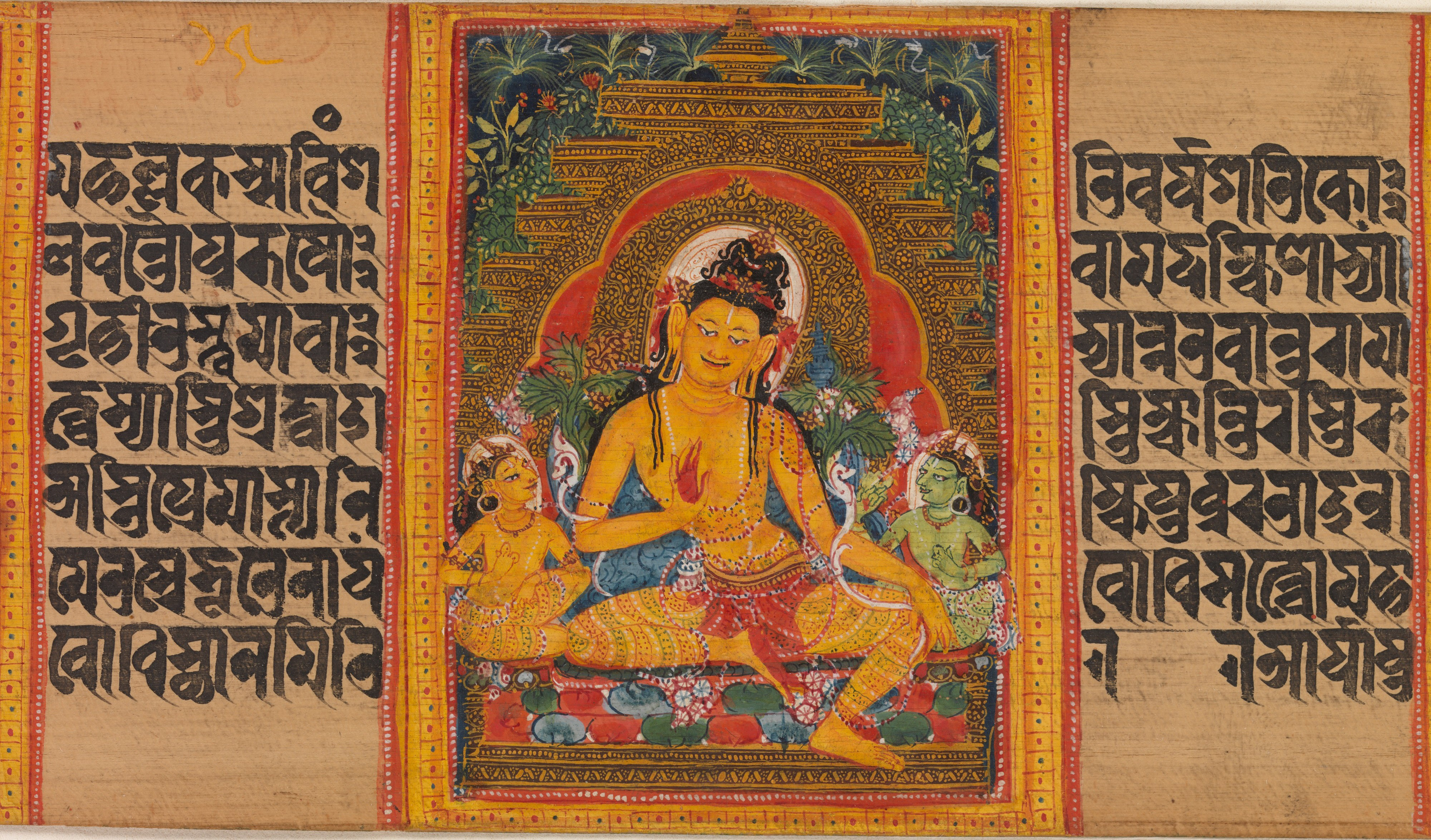
Maitreya in a leaf from a Aṣṭasāhasrikā Prajñāpāramitā Sūtra Manuscript, Bengal, early 12th century

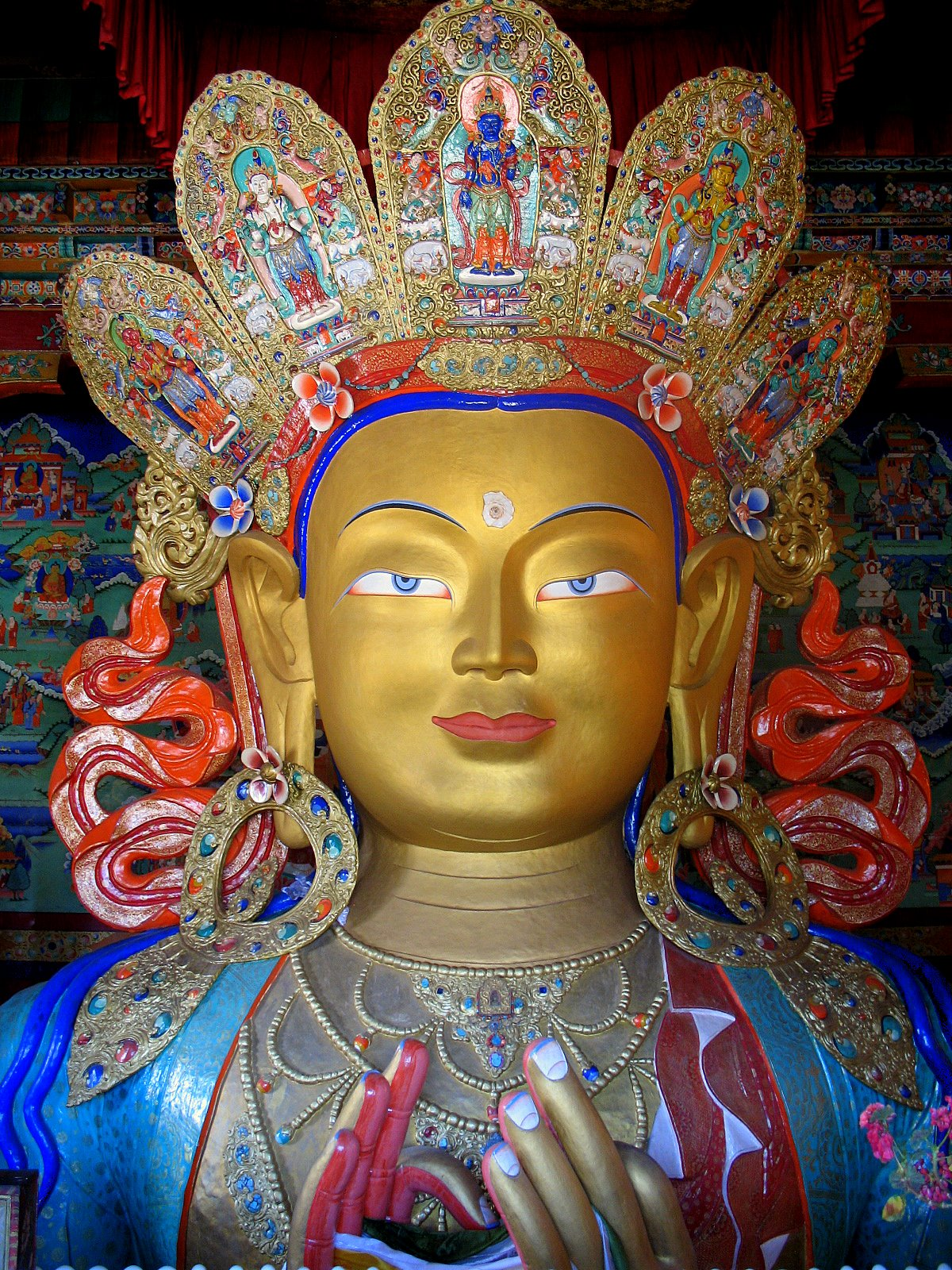
Close-up of a statue depicting Maitreya Bodhisattva at the Thikse Monastery in Ladakh, India

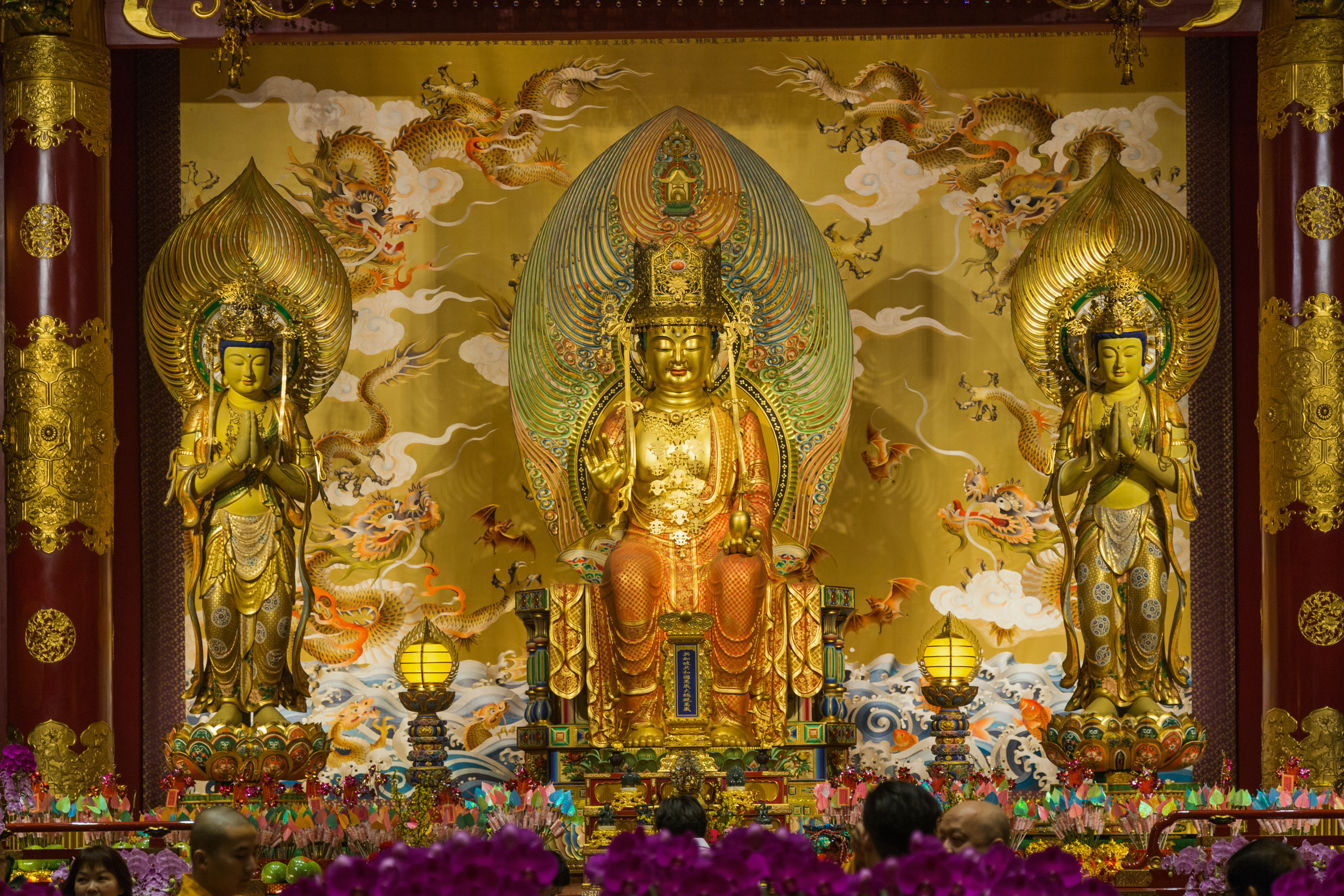
Maitreya centered altar, Buddha Tooth Relic Temple and Museum, Chinatown, Singapore

Mahayana sources contain various mantras and dharanis of Maitreya.

His common name mantra (as taught in Shingon Buddhism) is:

oṃ maitreya svāhā

Another Maitreya mantra taught in the Tibetan tradition is:

oṃ āḥ maitrī sarva siddhi hūṃ

Two other mantras from the Chinese canon (in a text translated by Kūkai) include:

Namaḥ samanta-buddhānāṃ aparājite jayanti svāhā

Namaḥ samanta-buddhānāṃ ajitaṃjaya sarva-sattva-āśaya-anugata svāhā

=== Dharanis ===
A popular dharani taught in Tibetan Buddhism is the Incantation of Noble Maitreya's Promise (Ārya-maitri-pratijñā-nāma-dhāraṇī):

Namo ratnatrayāya namo bhagavate śākyamunaye tathāgatāyārhate samyaksaṃbuddhāya.

Tadyathā: oṃ ajite ajite aparājite ajitañjaya hara hara maitri avalokite kara kara mahāsamayasiddhe bhara bhara mahābodhimaṇḍabīje smara smara asmākaṃ samaya bodhi bodhi mahābodhi svāhā

oṃ mohi mohi mahāmohi svāhā

oṃ muni muni smara svāhā

English translation:

[Homage] Homage to the Three Jewels. Homage to the Lord Shakyamuni, Tathagata, Arhat, Completely Perfect Buddha.

As follows: [Root mantra] Om Invincible, Invincible, Unconquered Conquer the Unconquered, take, take [it], You Who Look Down with Friendliness, act, act, Bring, bring the fulfillment of your great pledge, Shake the seat of great awakening, Remember, remember [your] pledge for us, Awakening, awakening, great awakening, svaha.

[Heart mantra] Om fascinating, fascinating, greatly fascinating, svaha.

[Close Heart mantra] Om sage, sage, remember, svaha.

Another version of the dharani can be found in Toh 890 of the Kangyur alongside the benefits of reciting it:

Homage to the Three Jewels.

Homage to Maitreya the Victorious One.

namo ratna trayāya namo bhagavate śākyamunaye tathāgatāya arhate samyaksaṃbuddhāya tadyathā oṃ ajite ajite aparājite ajitaṃ jaya hara hara maitri avalokite kara kara mahāsamayasiddhe bhara bhara mahābodhimaṇḍabīje smara smara asmakaṃ samaya bodhi bodhi mahābodhi svāhā

This was the root mantra.

oṃ mohi mohi mahāmohi svāhā

This was the heart mantra.

oṃ muni muni smara svāhā

This was the auxiliary heart mantra.

“Once I have fully awakened to unsurpassed and perfectly complete enlightenment, I will be certain to search out any being who simply hears, recites, chants, correctly contemplates, or meditates on this dhāraṇī and offer them a prophecy for unsurpassed and perfectly complete enlightenment. Even if this dhāraṇī is recited into the ear of a deer or bird from the animal realm, they will also receive a prophecy for unsurpassed and perfectly complete enlightenment. Whoever merely hears this will never go to the lower realms, nor will they be stained by the dirt of the lower realms. They will not be reborn in a mother’s womb. They will become a universal monarch for a thousand divine eons. They will inhabit the path of the ten virtuous actions. Whichever material enjoyments they wish for and seek will appear for them. I, a blessed one, will never forget that being. Having reached the seat of awakening, I will absolutely provide them, no matter who they are, a prophecy for unsurpassed and perfectly complete enlightenment.”

The Chinese canon contains the following:

namo ratna-trayāya, nama āryāvalokiteśvarāya bodhi-sattvāya mahāsatvāya mahākāruṇikāya tad-yathā, oṃ, maitre maitre maitra-manasi maitra-sambhave maitra-udbhave mahāsamaye svāhā

== Maitreya in East Asia ==
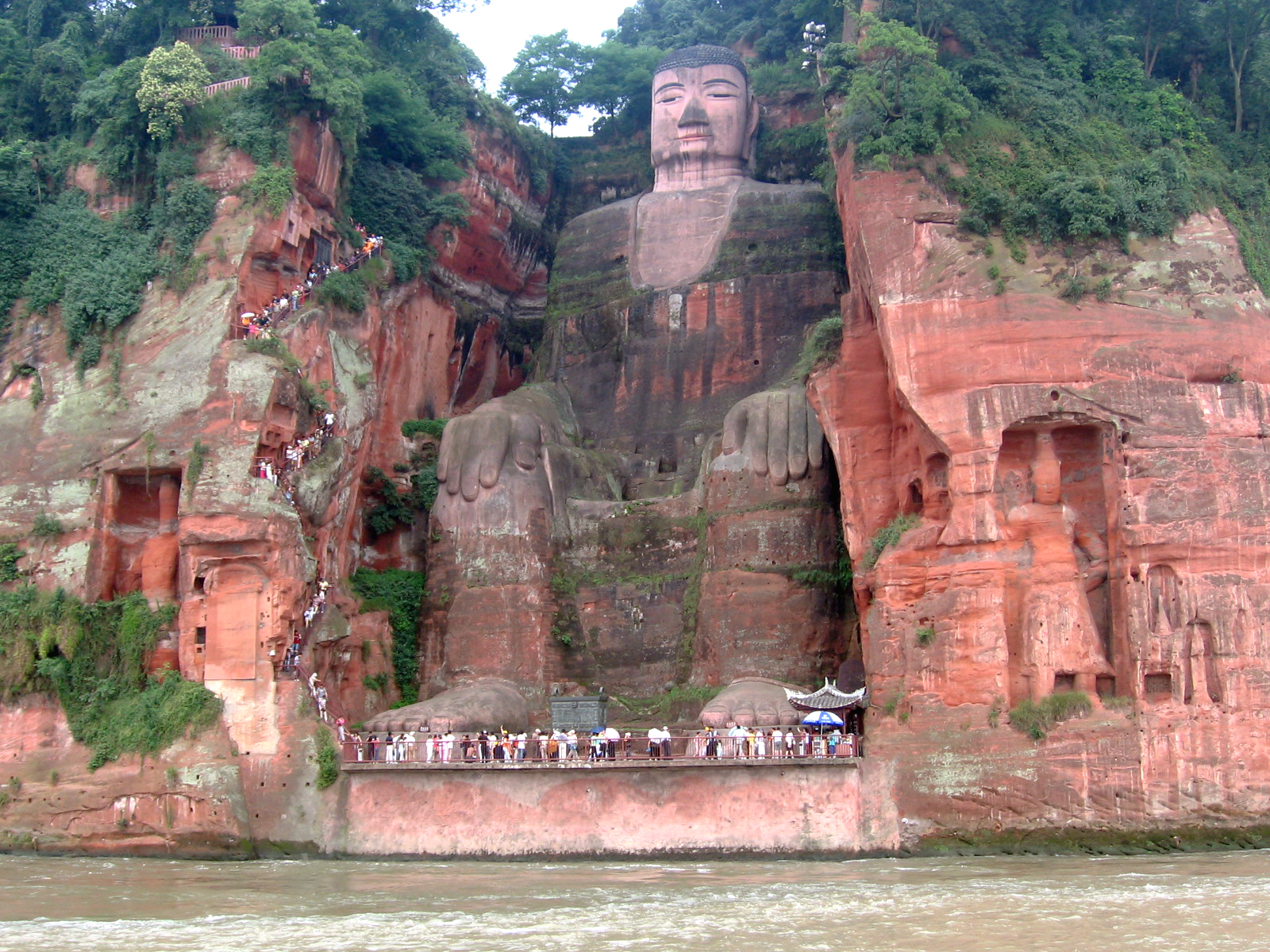
Seated stone-carved Maitreya, Leshan Giant Buddha in Sichuan, China

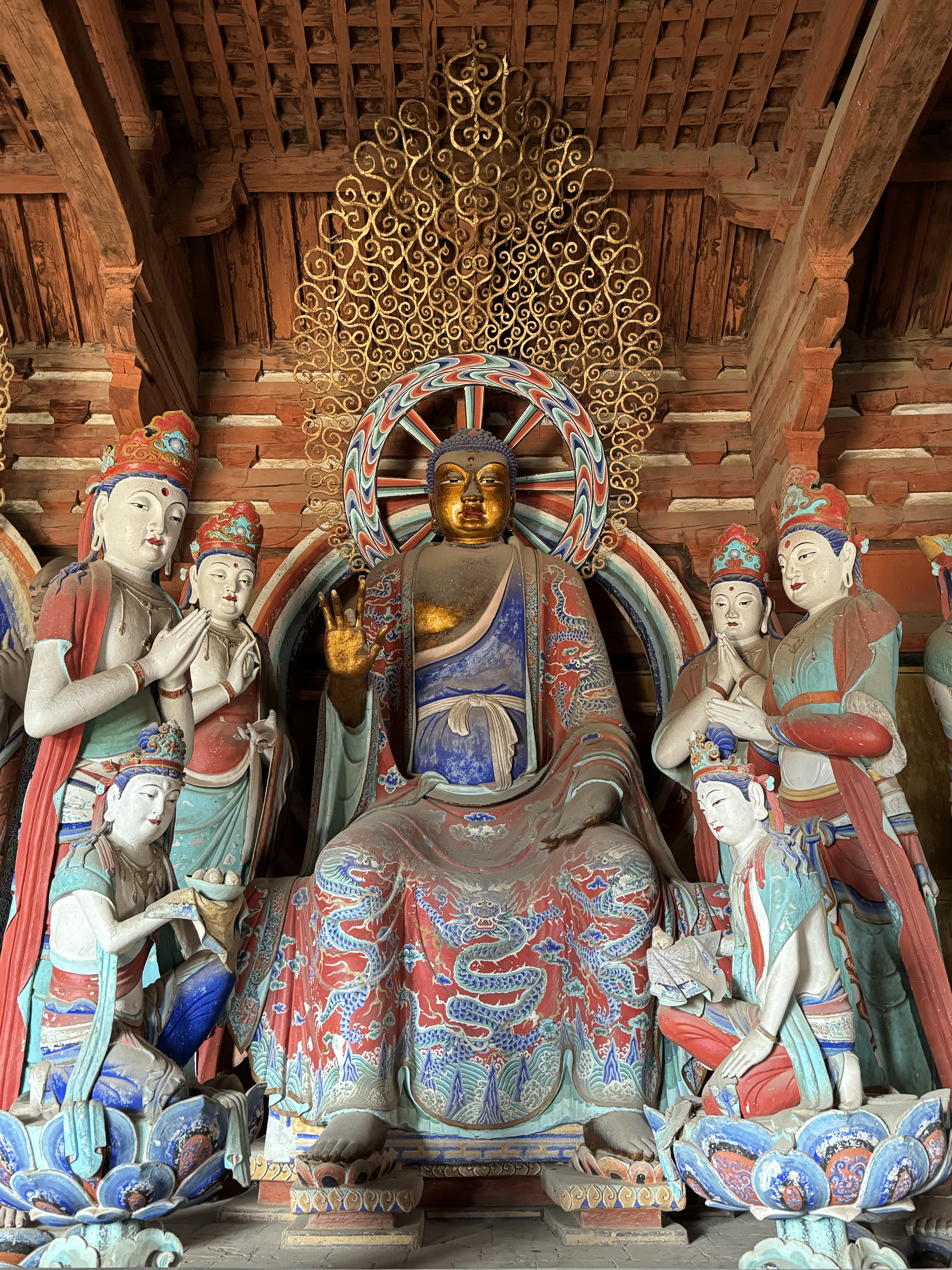
Tang dynasty (618-907) statues of Maitreya (Mi Le) surrounded by attendant bodhisattvas at Foguang Temple in Wutai, Shanxi, China.

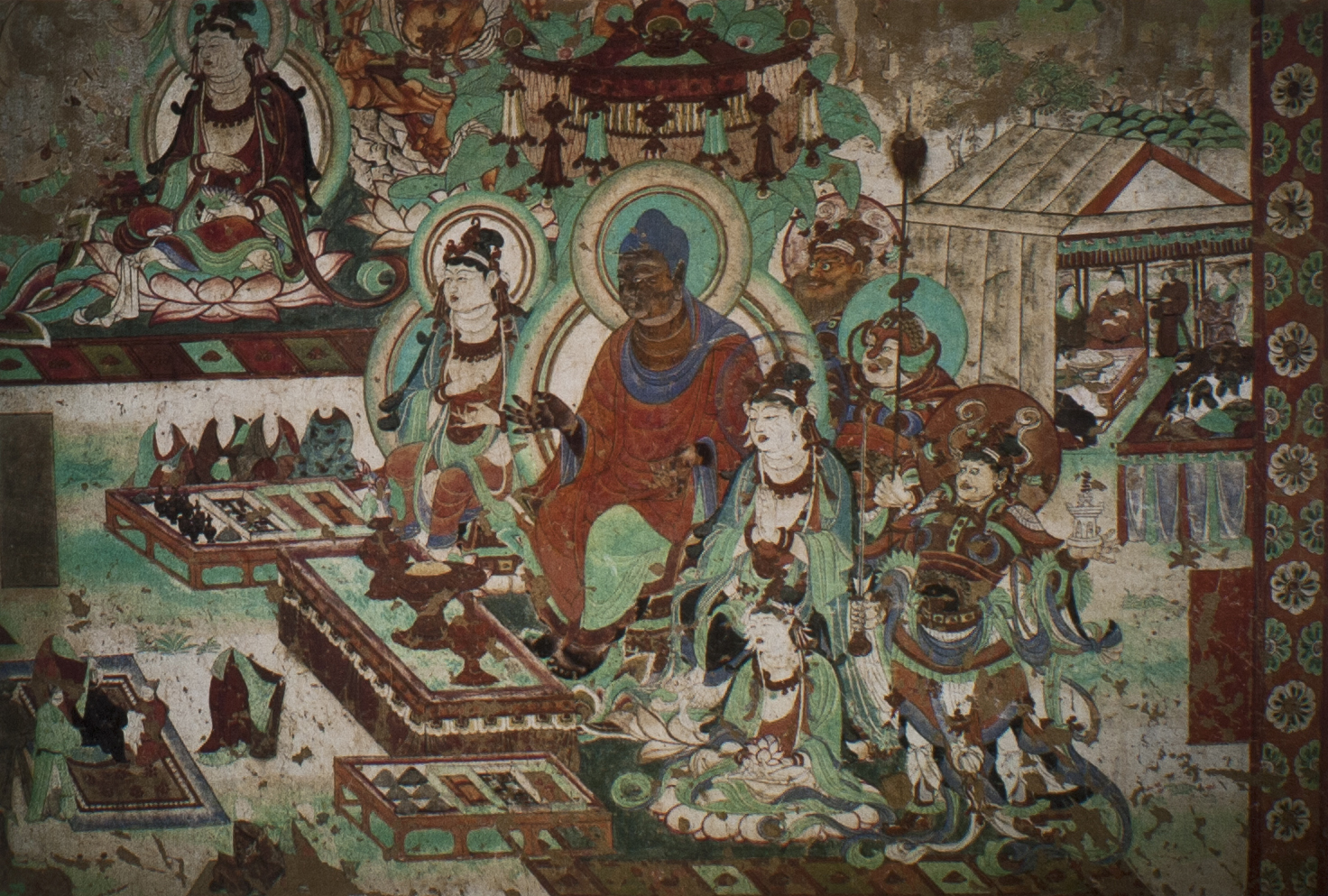
Illustration of the Maitreya Sutra, Yulin Caves, Gansu, China

=== Maitreya devotion ===
Maitreya devotion (Chinese: 彌勒信仰) has been a part of East Asian Buddhism since the time of Dao'an (312–85), who is known to have founded a Maitreya devotionalism in China. Maitreya devotion was popular during the Northern Wei period (386–534). During the Sui Dynasty, three separate people declared themselves to be incarnations of Maitreya, attempting to bolster their authority, lead insurrections, and overthrow the Sui Dynasty (each attempted overthrow was ultimately unsuccessful).

Devotional practices to Maitreya were an important part of the East Asian Yogacara school. A key element of Maitreya devotion in East Asia is the intention to be reborn in Maitreya's Inner Court of Tushita Heaven (兜率內院). Some Buddhist scriptures have noted that Maitreya is currently teaching at the Inner Court of Tushita, and some East Asian masters who were Maitreya devotees, such as Xuanzang (7th century), Kuiji, Wonhyo, and Yijing, had the intention of being reborn there after their death.

Xuanzang was a famous devotee of Maitreya who vowed to be reborn in his Tushita palace so that he could "serve upon the Kind Lord", and to eventually "descend with him to perform the deeds of the Buddhas, until we attain unsurpassed bodhi". Xuanzang also taught a devotional verse (gatha) and taught everyone to recite it, the gatha is:

Namo Maitreya Tathagata, the Perfectly Awakened One! May all living beings swiftly be in the presence of your kind visage. Namo the inner community abiding with Maitreya Tathagata! After I shed this life, may I be reborn among them.

The work of the Silla monk Wŏnhyo (617–686), especially his commentary on the Maitreya sutras, is an important source for East Asian Maitreya devotion. According to this work, Maitreya devotion consists of a visualization meditation in which one visualizes the majestic adornments of Tushita heaven and "the superiority of receiving rebirth [there] as a bodhisattva." According to Spongberg, "this means that one is to visualize oneself, personally present, amidst all of the splendors of Tusita Heaven, splendors that certainly include, but are not limited to, Maitreya." The practice further includes hearing the name of Maitreya (a kind of mindfulness of the Buddha), "respectfully trusting in the virtues manifested by this name", repenting past bad deeds, and other ritual acts like taking care of stupas, offering incense, flowers, etc. According to Wonhyo, this practice results in being reborn in Tushita to personally receive teachings from Maitreya so that one cannot relapse from Buddhahood.

A famous episode during Xuanzang's travels illustrates his devotion to Maitreya. While sailing on the Ganges, he was overtaken by pirates who were going to sacrifice him to Durga. After asking for a moment of silence to meditate, Xuanzang meditated on Maitreya, praying he would be reborn in Tushita with him and focusing his thoughts on the bodhisattva. Xuanzang then had a vision of Maitreya seated on his glittering throne in Tushita surrounded by many devas. Then a storm came and the pirates, terrified, threw themselves at Xuanzang's feet.

Modern Chinese Buddhist monks, such as Xuyun, have also been known to have dreamt of going to the Inner Court of Tushita. The modern Chinese reformer Taixu 太虛 (1890–1947), one of the key founders of Humanistic Buddhism, was also a devotee of Maitreya. He is known to have promoted devotional practices and liturgies focused on Maitreya and was even said to have propagated the "Maitreya School" (Cizong 慈宗).

Maitreya devotion is most widely practiced in Chinese Mahayana Buddhism, but it may also be found in other Chinese religions, like Yiguandao.

Maitreya devotion was also popular in Silla Korea and in Japanese Buddhism.

=== Maitreya teachings and millenarianism ===
Throughout Chinese history, the Buddhist prophecy of Maitreya and the doctrine of the age of social decline (Chinese: 末法; pinyin: Mò Fǎ; "the Degenerate Age of Dharma") was adopted and wielded by numerous religious, social and political groups. Some of these groups operated as secret societies, like the White Lotus Society. Many of these groups held millenarian beliefs about the imminent arrival of Maitreya. Not all of these groups were orthodox Buddhists, and some combined Chinese folk religion, Buddhism and Taoist beliefs. Nattier points out that there was a pre-existent Taoist belief in a messianic savior figure (Li Hong). Some of these millenarian groups held antiestablishment views and even led rebellions against the Chinese state at various points of socio-political crisis.

During the Sui Dynasty, there were three different rebellions led by three separate leaders who claimed to be Maitreya, one in 610 at the capital (Chang'an) and two in 613 (one led by magician named Song Zixian and another by a monk named Xiang Haiming). During the Tang dynasty, another Maitreyan rebellion was led by a certain Wang Huaigu. During the Song, Wang Ze led a revolt of Buddhists expecting Maitreya (1047); they took over the city of Beizhou in Hebei before they were crushed. The Song Dynasty government declared Maitreya Sects to be "heresies and unsanctioned religions". Tens of thousands of Maitreya Sect followers were killed.

The Yuan dynasty saw the Red Turban Rebellion (aka The First White Lotus Rebellion c. 1351–1368) led by Han Shantong, leader of the White Lotus Society, and Army Commander Liu Futong rebelled against the Mongols.

A Second White Lotus Rebellion broke out in 1796 among impoverished settlers in the mountainous region that separates Sichuan from Hubei and Shaanxi as a protest against heavy taxes imposed by the Manchu rulers of the Qing Dynasty. The White Lotus Society influenced the development of the 19th century "Society of Harmonious Fists" which led the Boxer Rebellion in 1899.

=== Japanese Buddhism ===
Maitreya is a central figure for the Japanese Yogacara school (Hossō-shū) which considers Maitreya to be the founder of the tradition. Maitreya (Jp. Miroku) devotion was extensively promoted during the Kamakura period (1185–1333) by Hossō-shū scholars like Jōkei (1155–1213).

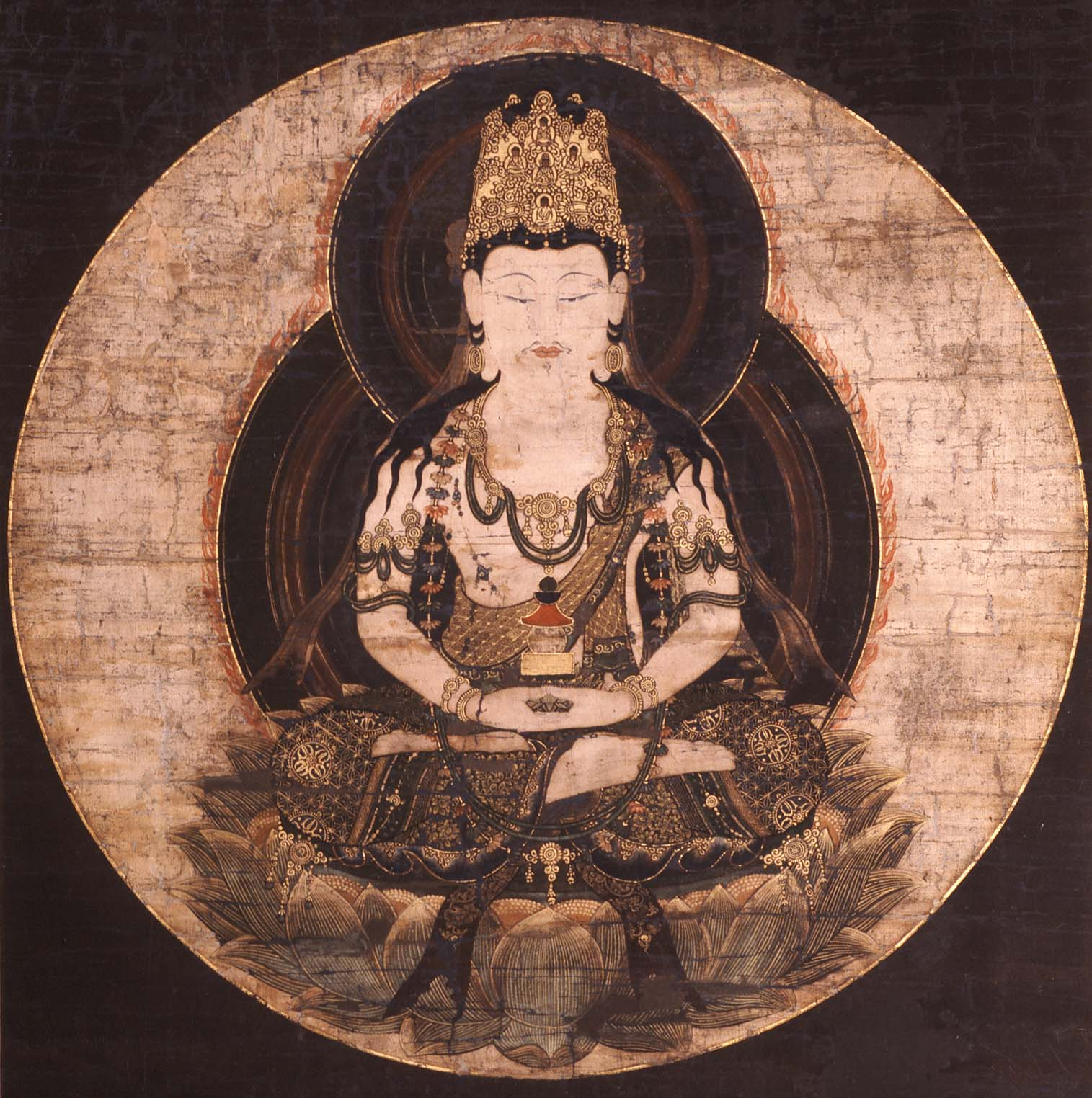
Japanese illustration of Maitreya (Miroku), Chōgenji, Obama, Fukui, Japan

The monk and religious founder of the Shingon sect Kukai is believed by Shingon adherents to currently be in a state of meditation on Mount Koya. He awaits the coming of Maitreya. Following his example, later Shingon meditators attempted to self-mummify (known as Sokushinbutsu) through ascetic practices to also wait for the coming of Maitreya.

In Nichiren Buddhism, Maitreya is seen as a steward and protector of the bodhisattvas who teach the Lotus Sutra, a view promoted by the sutra itself. According to Nichiren, all beings can be "Maitreya", since the true meaning of this name "designates the Votaries of the Lotus Sutra" who compassionately uphold the teaching of this sutra.

=== Association with Budai ===
In East Asian Buddhism, Maitreya is widely associated with Budai (布袋; Vietnamese: Bố Đại; Japanese: Hotei), a Chinese Buddhist monk traditionally dated to the tenth century. According to accounts preserved in Chinese Buddhist literature, Budai was an eccentric wandering monk known for his large belly, unconventional behavior, and the cloth sack from which his name derives. He came to be regarded as a manifestation of Maitreya, an identification traditionally associated with a verse attributed to him shortly before his death, declaring that Maitreya appears in numerous forms but often goes unrecognized.

This association gave rise to the familiar Laughing Buddha representation of Maitreya, depicting a bald, rotund, smiling monk with an exposed belly, loose monastic robes, and sometimes a cloth sack or prayer beads. In East Asian Buddhist art and popular religious practice, Budai's image became associated with contentment, generosity, happiness, and prosperity. He is frequently represented in Chinese and Vietnamese Buddhist temples, while in Japan, Hotei is also revered as one of the Seven Lucky Gods.

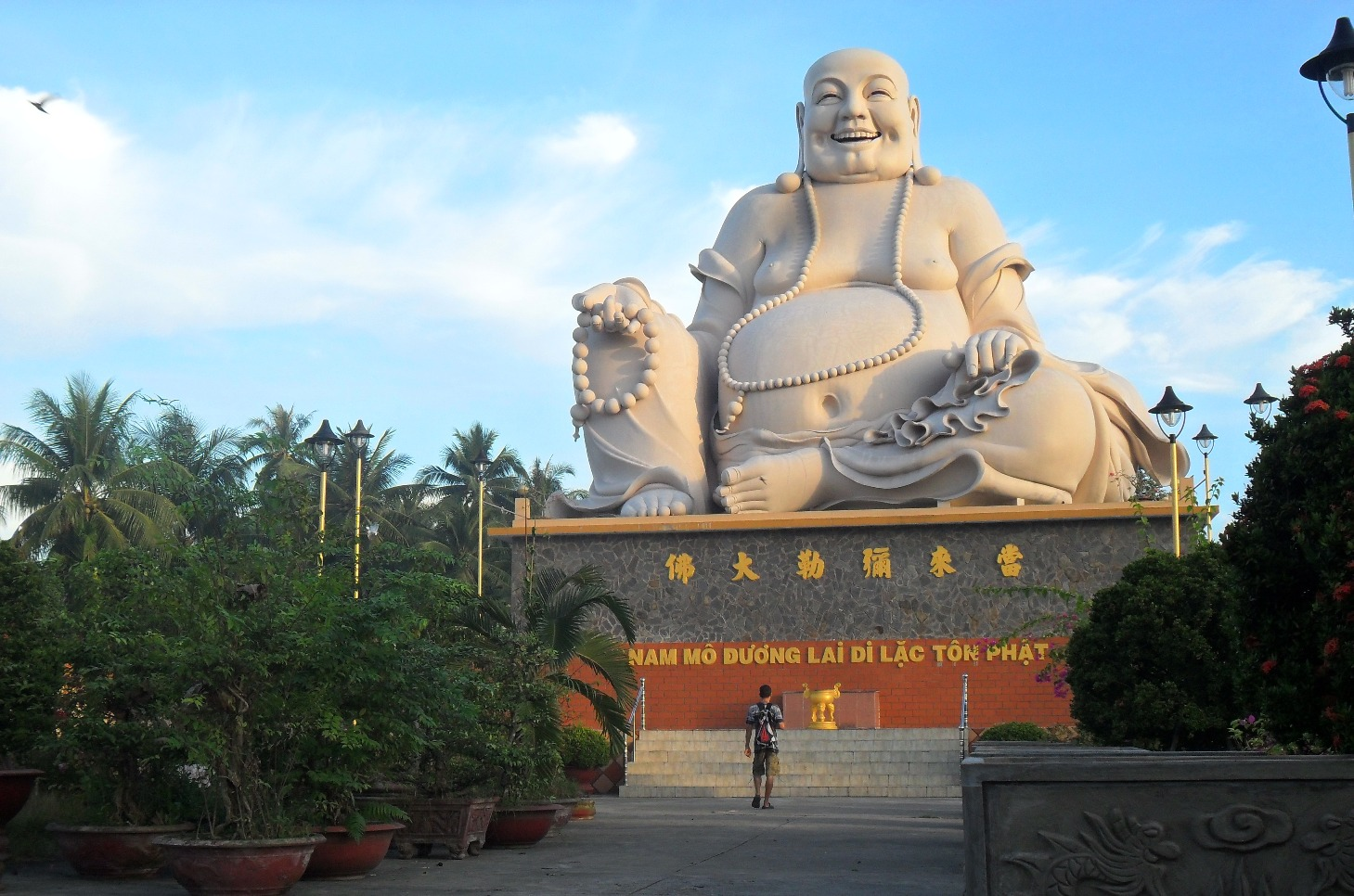
Maitreya in Budai form, Ving Trang (Vĩnh Tràng) Pagoda, Mỹ Tho, Vietnam

The Budai representation exists alongside older iconographic traditions depicting Maitreya as a crowned and ornamented bodhisattva or a seated figure awaiting his future Buddhahood. The identification of Budai with Maitreya represents a distinctive development in East Asian Buddhism rather than a description found in the early Buddhist scriptures concerning the future Buddha.

== Non-Buddhist views ==
=== Chinese salvationist religions ===
Beginning with the White Lotus Society (whose roots go back to the 12th century), Maitreya has been an important part of many Chinese salvationist religions. In many of these, Maitreya is seen as a "primordial one" and a heavenly religious leader who will come to change the world radically. The most common myth is that Maitreya is a savior sent by Eternal Venerable Mother (Wusheng Laomu, i.e. Queen Mother of the West) to show people the way to their true home, the heaven of the Eternal Mother, where all beings are originally from. According to some of these sectarian salvation religions, Maitreya's arrival is immanent and he will usher the final age in which all beings will be reunited with the Eternal Mother, an event called the "recovery of original wholeness" (shou-yuan).

One modern example of such a sect is Yiguandao (Eternal Way), a 19th century salvationist religion. In Yiguandao, Maitreya is a key figure, a great savior, patriach and teacher sent by the Eternal Venerable Mother. Yiguandao claims that during the end times, Maitreya will incarnate on Earth to save humanity, known among believers as Mile Zushi (Chinese: 彌勒祖師; lit. 'Grand Patriach Mile'). Maitreya appears as a similar figure in another popular salvation religion, Xiantiandao (Chinese: 先天道; pinyin: Xiāntiān Dào; lit. 'Way of Former Heaven').

=== Theosophy and New Age ===
In Theosophy, Maitreya (or Lord Maitreya) has multiple aspects signifying not just the future Buddha, but similar concepts from other religious or spiritual traditions. For modern Theosophy, Maitreya is an advanced enlightened being and a high-ranking member of secret spiritual hierarchy, the Masters of the Ancient Wisdom. These masters guide the spiritual evolution of humanity and Maitreya is said to hold the "Office of the World Teacher". As such, Maitreya is in charge of teaching and guiding humanity. As Annie Besant writes, Maitreya has "the duty of watching over the spiritual destinies of mankind; of guiding, blessing, maintaining the various religions of the world, founded in outline by Himself."

Maitreya may occasionally incarnate in the world to guide humanity directly. Some Theosophists, like C. W. Leadbeater, held that Maitreya previously reincarnated as Christ. In the early 20th century, leading Theosophists became convinced that a return of Maitreya as a "World Teacher" was imminent. At this time, a South Indian boy, Jiddu Krishnamurti, was thought to be destined as the "vehicle" for Maitreya; however, in his early 30s, Krishnamurti, himself, declined to serve in this role.

The Theosophical Maitreya gave rise to further Western conceptions of Maitreya as a future world teacher who would usher in a new age for humanity's spiritual evolution. The related Ascended Master Teachings also contains teachings about Maitreya. Various views regarding Maitreya can thus be found in contemporary New Age and Esoteric groups.

=== Post-theosophical movements ===
Since the growth of Theosophy in the late 19th century, diverse religions and spiritual movements have adopted and reinterpreted older Jain, Hindu and Buddhist beliefs about Maitreya. Share International, for example, equates Maitreya with the prophesied figures of multiple religious traditions, claims that Maitreya is already present in the world but is preparing to make an open declaration of his presence in the near future. They claim that he is here to inspire mankind to create a new era based on sharing and justice.

In the beginning of the 1930s, the Ascended Master Teachings placed Maitreya in the "Office of World Teacher" until 1956, when he was described as moving on to the "Office of Planetary Buddha" and "Cosmic Christ" in their concept of a Spiritual Hierarchy.

In 1911, Rudolf Steiner claimed "Roughly three thousand years after our time the world will experience the Maitreya Buddha incarnation, which will be the last incarnation of Jeshu ben Pandira. This Bodhisattva, who will come as Maitreya Buddha, will also come in a physical body in our century in his reincarnation in the flesh—but not as Buddha—and he will make it his task to give humanity all the true concepts about the Christ Event." Steiner was careful to distinguish Jeshu ben Pandira as somebody entirely distinct from Jesus of Nazareth, as Maitreya was said to be entirely distinct from Jesus (but in moment-to-moment relationship with him the last three years of his life).

=== Ahmadiyya ===
The Ahmadiyyas believe Mirza Ghulam Ahmad (1835–1908) fulfilled expectations regarding the Maitreya Buddha. The founder has given the whole account about the truth of forthcoming of Jesus Christ and his travel via Tibet and the transformation of word "Masiha" to "Metteyya" in one of his Prolific writings "Jesus in India" (Maseeh Hindustan Mai).

=== Baháʼí Faith ===
Followers of the Baháʼí Faith believe that Bahá'u'lláh is the fulfillment of the prophecy of appearance of Maitreya, the fifth Buddha. Baháʼís believe that the prophecy that Maitreya will usher in a new society of tolerance and love has been fulfilled by Bahá'u'lláh's teachings on world peace.

== Maitreya claimants ==
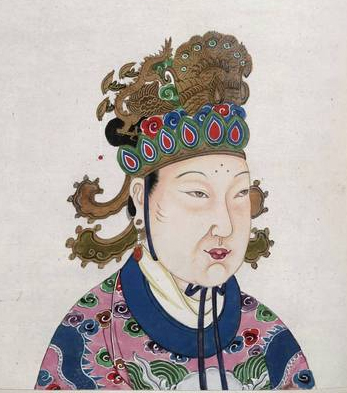
Tang Dynasty Empress Wu Zetian, who claimed to be Maitreya incarnate

The following list is just a small selection of those people who claimed or claim to be the incarnation of Maitreya. Many have either used the Maitreya incarnation claim to form a new Buddhist sect, a new religious movement or cult or even a political rebellion.

- In the 5th century, Fu Dashi (傅大士) implied that he was the reincarnation of Maitreya and founded the Maitreya Sect (彌勒教) which was established during the reign of Liang Wudi (梁武帝).
- In 515, a monk from Jizhou of the Northern Wei dynasty named Faqing (法庆), proclaimed himself as the "New Buddha", "Mahayana Buddha" quoting Buddhist scriptures that "Maitreya has descended to become a Buddha", and "Maitreya Buddha replaces Sakyamuni Buddha to save the world". Faqing gathered an army to rebel against the rule of the Wei dynasty in the name of Buddhism."
- Feng Yi (冯宜) and Heyue (贺悦), Hu people from Wucheng County of the Northern Wei dynasty in the 6th century led a rebellion claiming to be Maitreya Buddha against the Northern Wei army on the outskirts of Yuntai city.
- Song Zixian (宋子贤), a native of Tang County in the Sui dynasty, who was an expert in magic, and claimed to be able to transform into the form of Buddha and claimed to be an incarnation of Maitreya Buddha and staged a rebellion.
- In 613 the monk Xiang Haiming (向海明) claimed himself Maitreya and adopted an imperial title. He declared the beginning of new era Baiwu (白烏).
- In the early years of Tang Dynasty rule (713), Wang Huaigu (王怀古) of Tangbeizhou led a rebellion claiming to be the New Buddha (interpreted as Maitreya Buddha).
- In 690 Wu Zetian, empress regnant of the Wu Zhou interregnum (690–705), proclaimed herself an incarnation of the future Buddha Maitreya, and made Luoyang the "holy capital". In 693 she temporarily replaced the compulsory Dao De Jing in the curriculum with her own Rules for Officials.
- Gung Ye, a South Korean warlord and king of the short-lived state of Taebong during the 10th century, claimed himself as the living incarnation of Maitreya and ordered his subjects to worship him. His claim was widely rejected by most Buddhist monks and later he was dethroned and killed by his own servants.
- In 1047, Wang Ze (王則), a farmer in Zhuozhou went to Beizhou to herd sheep for a local landowner, then rebelled claiming to be the ruler of Dongping (东平郡主) with the slogan "The time of Sakyamuni Buddha has passed, Maitreya Buddha takes the place of leading the power of nature."
- Gao Tansheng (高昙晟), a monk from Huaizhou in the 7th century gathered nearly 50 monks to assassinate the county magistrate and the general of the city guard using the belief that the era of Maitreya Buddha was coming, and proclaimed himself as the "Mahayana Emperor (大乘皇帝)" and founded Jianyuan falun (建元法轮).
- Liu Ningjing (刘凝静), a woman from Wannian County, Sichuan during the Northern Song dynasty claimed that the era of Maitreya would come to the world and rebelled.
- Du Ke Yong (杜可用), also known as Du Wanyi (杜萬一), the leader of the Jiangxi people's revolution in the early Yuan dynasty, which began with the White Lotus sect, referred to himself as Du Shengren (杜聖人), called by the name of Vidyārāja (明王), using the narrative "Maitreya has been born, and Vidyārāja has been born."
- Wang Lun (王倫), a leader of the White Lotus sect in Shandong province, China in the 1770s said that he was the rebirth of Maitreya and destined to become the Emperor of China, he mobilized his followers and marched towards the city of Shouzhang to stage a rebellion in October 1774.
- In 1777, a man named Wang Fulin, announced that he was an incarnation of Maitreya Buddha and his mother was Wusheng Laomu at a Yuan-tun sect meeting he called the Great Dragon Flower meeting with about a thousand disciples to stage an uprising in Hozhou city and Lanzhou province.
- Bahá'u'lláh (1817–1892), the Prophet-Founder of the Bahá'í Faith, is recognized by Bahá'ís as the promised Maitreya Buddha and Promised One of all religions.
- Wang Tianzu (王添組), a disciple of Wu Zixiang (10th patriarch of Yiguandao) claimed to be an incarnation of Maitreya and claimed to foresaw an approaching apocalypse. He had a disciple Liao Ganzhou (廖幹周) who gathered 1500 followers who wore white turbans emblazoned with red crosses and organized a rebellion in Shicheng province, Jiangxi in the year of November 1803.
- Xu Hai Wu (徐還無), is believed by Yiguandao followers to be an incarnation of Maitreya along with Yang Hai Xiu (楊還虛) who is believed to be an incarnation of Guan Yin and became the 13th patriarch in Yiguandao's lineage.
- Lin Qing (林清) claiming to be an reincarnation of Maitreya Buddha together with Li Wencheng (李文成) claiming to be an incarnation of the Vidyārāja jointly carried out the Eight Trigrams Rebellion in 1813. His followers considered him to be sent by Wusheng Laomu to overthrow the Qing dynasty which they considered had lost mandate of heaven to rule.
- Liu Xi Er (劉四兒), the son of Liu Song (劉松) of the White Lotus sect also claimed to be an incarnation of Maitreya Buddha, and had a mission on earth to help Niu Ba (牛八) who was allegedly a descendant of the Ming empire to regain power.
- Lu Zhongyi (1849–1925), the 17th patriarch of Yiguandao, claimed to be an incarnation of Maitreya.
- Jiddu Krishnamurti, Indian-origin meditator, writer who frequently give lecture about life is believed to be the vehicle for Maitreya by Theosophical doctrine.
- Ram Bahadur Bomjon, a 34-year-old Nepalese ascetic who has been hailed by many as the new Buddha. Publicly labeling himself since 2012 as the "Maitriya" Guru, he and his followers openly claim that he is the awaited Maitreya Buddha. He is a controversial figure who is currently under investigation for rape charges, and separately for the disappearance of four members of his ashram.
- L. Ron Hubbard, founder of the belief systems Dianetics and Scientology, suggested he was "Metteya" (Maitreya) in the 1955 poem Hymn of Asia. Numerous editors and followers of Hubbard claim that in the book's preface, specific physical characteristics said to be outlined—in unnamed Sanskrit sources—as properties of the coming Maitreya were properties with which Hubbard's appearance supposedly aligned.
- Samael Aun Weor (1917–1977) – stated in The Aquarian Message that "the Maitreya Buddha Samael is the Kalki Avatar of the New Age." The Kalkian Avatar and Maitreya Buddha, he claimed, are the same "White Rider" of the Book of Revelation.
- Li Hongzhi (李洪志), founder of the Falun Gong spiritual movement, whom some followers believe to be Maitreya.
- American guru and godman Adi Da was suggested by his devotees to be Maitreya.
- Jose Luis de Jesus Miranda – A Puerto Rican preacher who claimed to be Maitreya and Jesus Christ reincarnated in the early 2000s.
- Followers of B.R. Ambedkar in the Dalit Buddhist Movement regard him as a bodhisattva, the Maitreya, although he never claimed it himself.
- In Honbushin, a Japanese new religion, the religion's founder Ōnishi Tama (1916–1969) is referred to as Miroku-sama (みろく様). Miroku (みろく) is the Japanese name for Maitreya, and sama is an honorific suffix.
- Some modern authors claim the Hindu Avatar Kalki is Maitreya.
- Some Muslim writers claimed Islamic prophet Muhammad as Maitreya.
- Manichaeism believed that its founder Mani is Maitreya. While the religion faded into obscurity, Mani is still worshipped as the Buddha of Light at the Cao'an temple and various villages in the Fujian province of China.

== Gallery ==
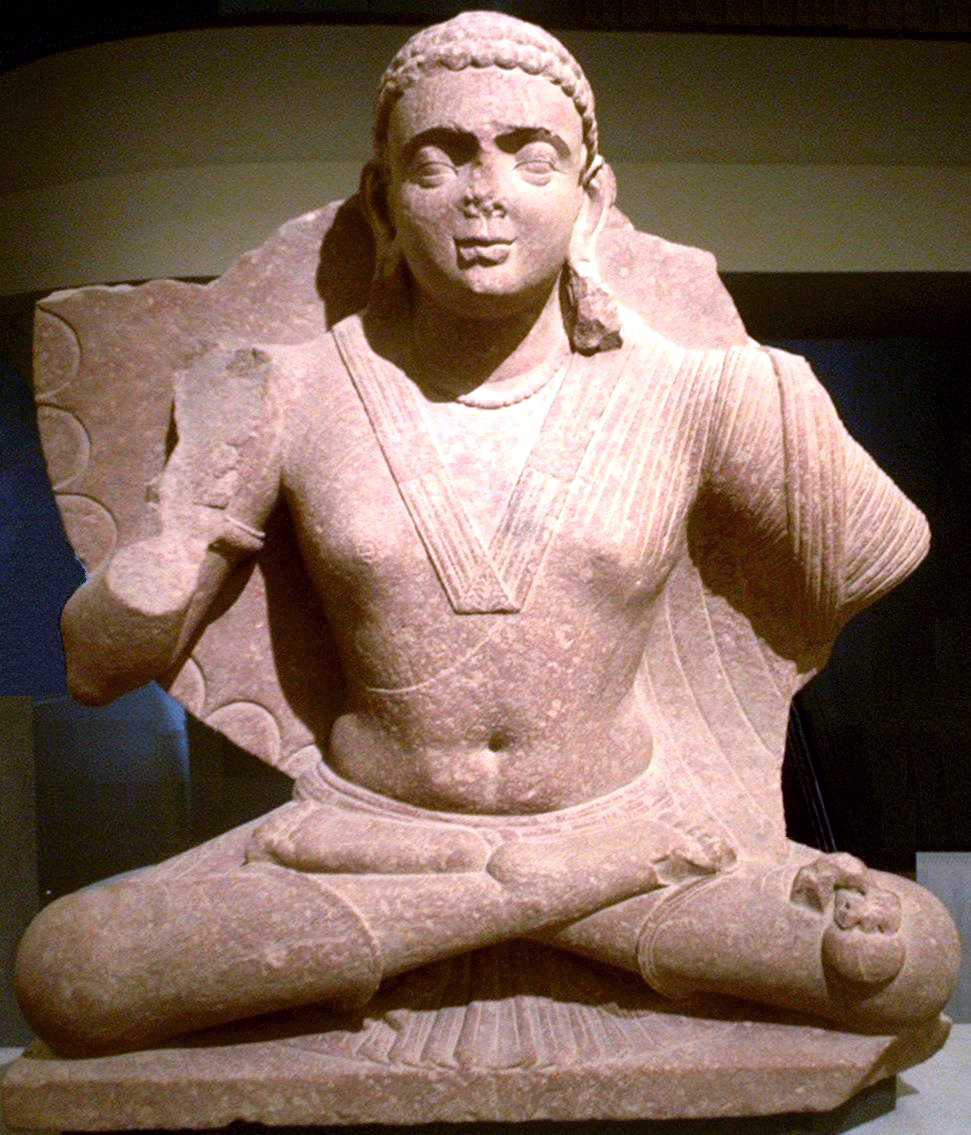
Maitreya (water bottle on left thigh), art of Mathura, second century CE

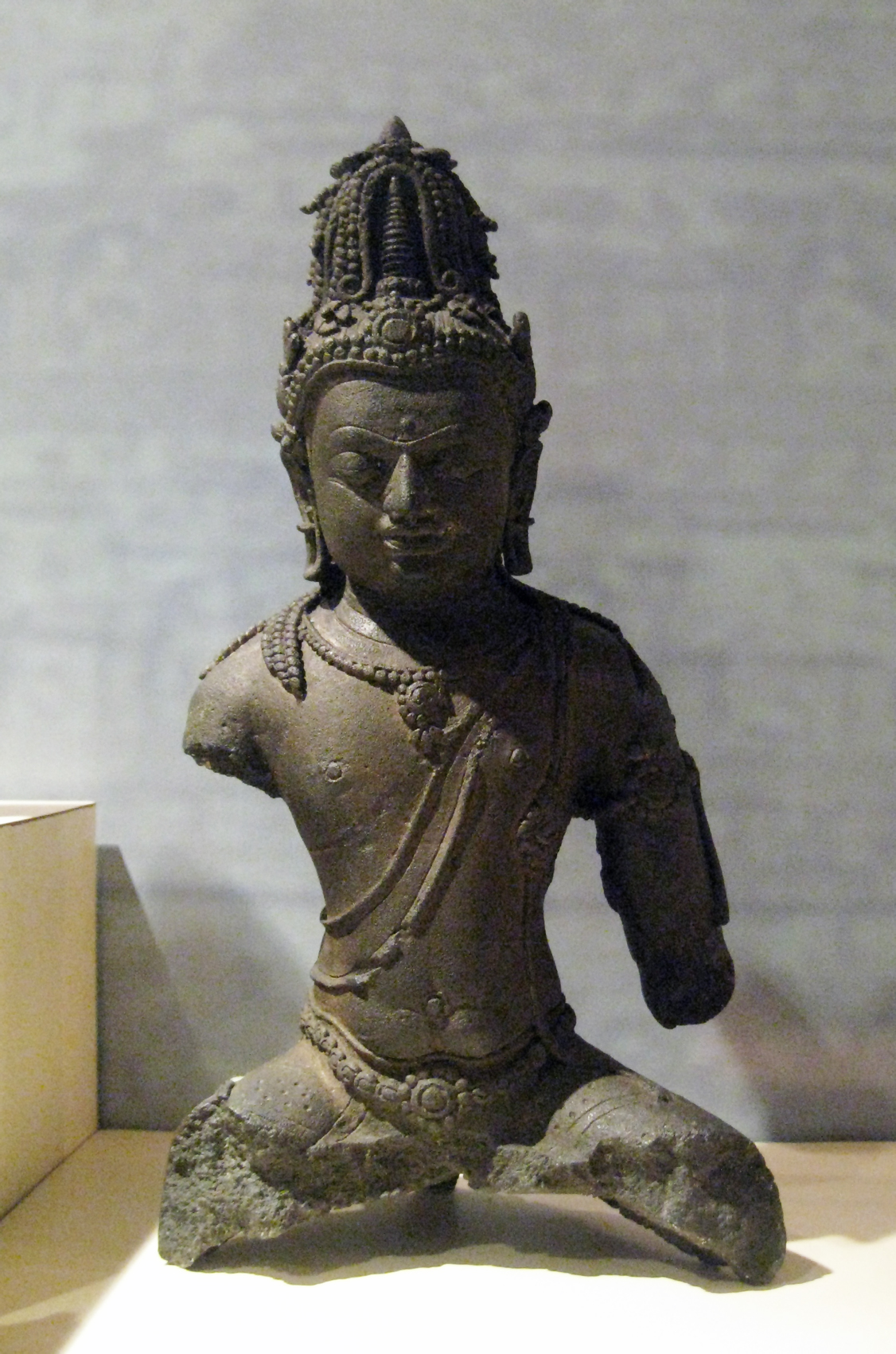
A 9th-century Srivijayan art bronze Maitreya from South Sumatra. A stupa adorns his crown.

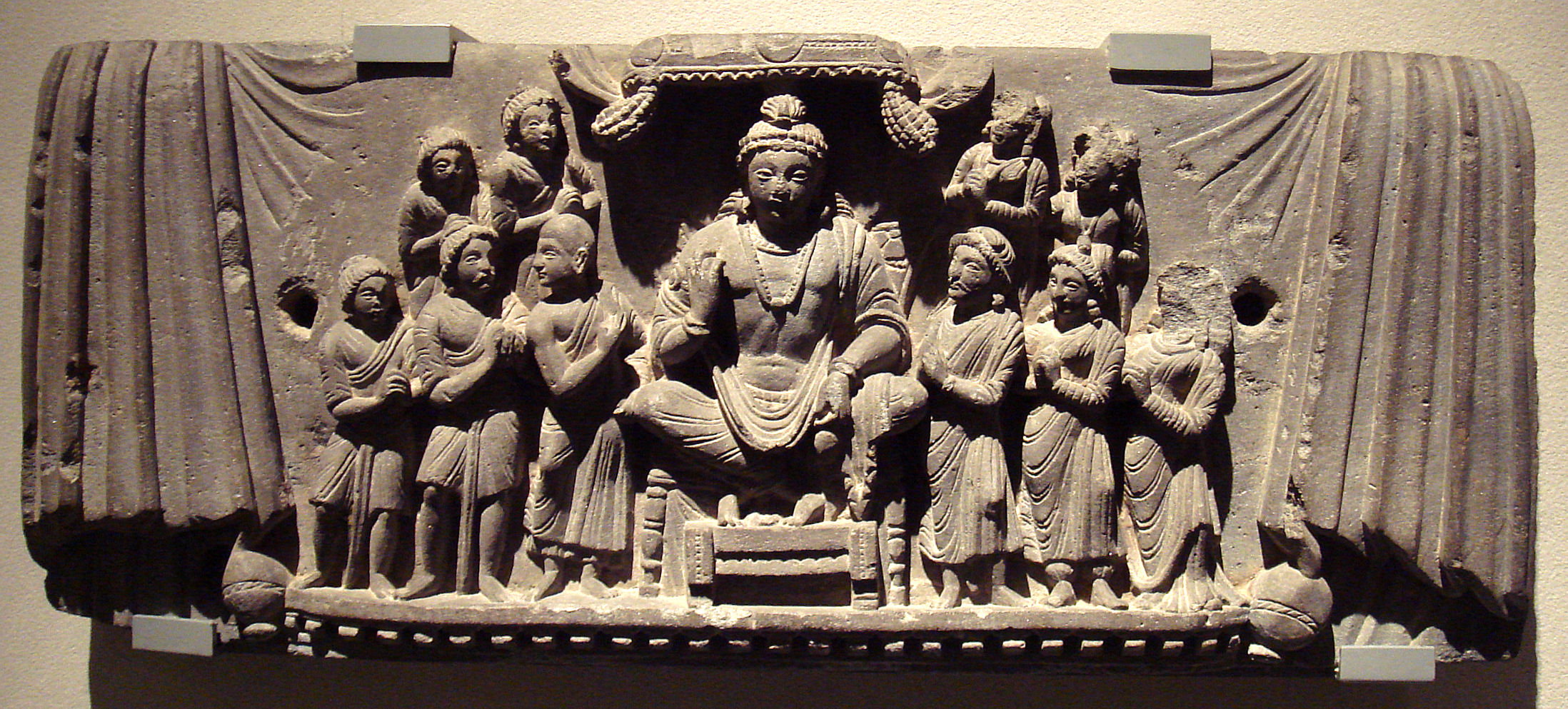
The future Buddha Maitreya, Gandhara, 3rd century CE

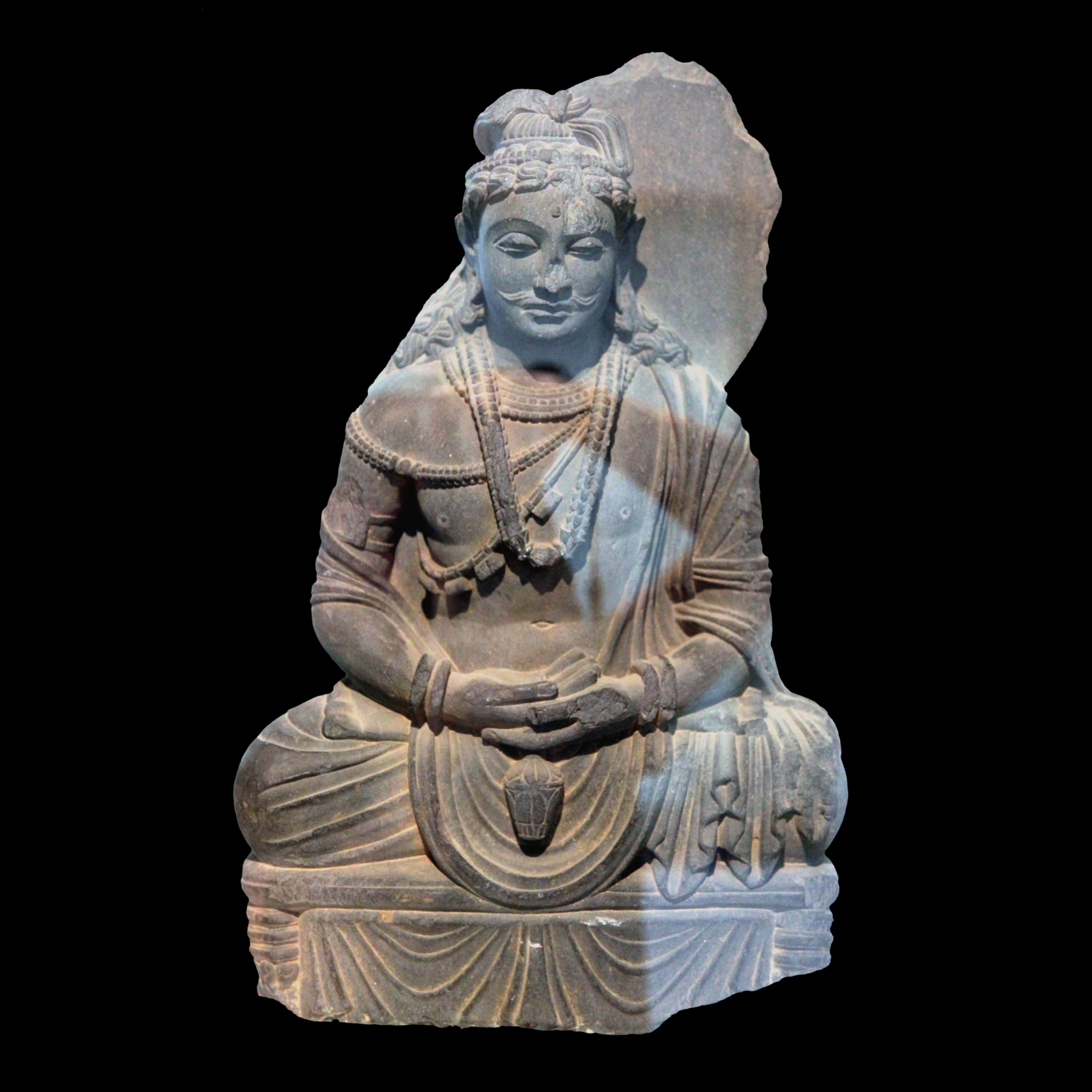
Sitting Maitreya (holding kumbha), Gandhara, 3rd century CE

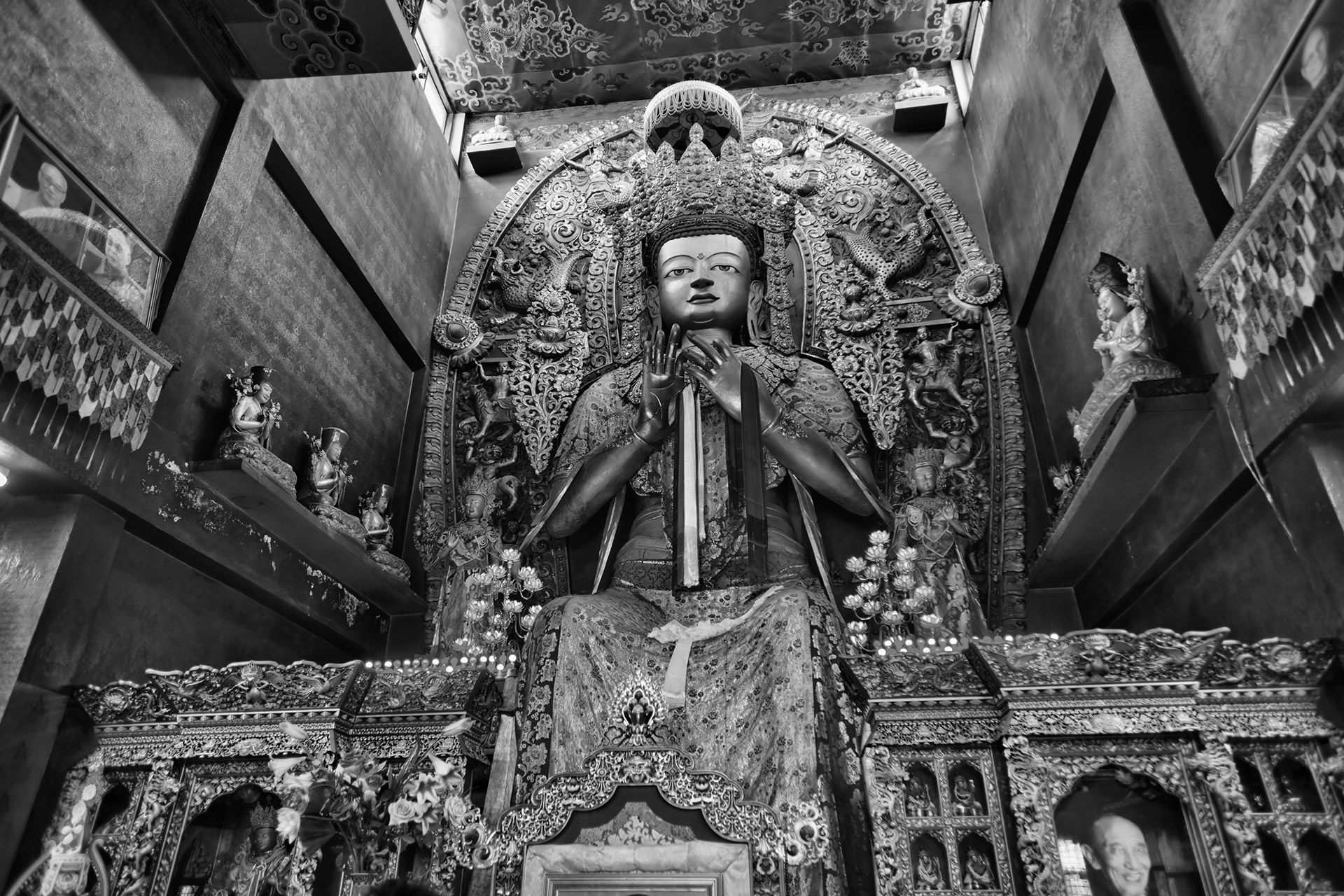
A statue of Maitreya Buddha inside Trikal Maitreya Buddha Vihara (Jamchen Lhakhang Monastery) at Bouddhanath premises, Kathmandu, Nepal

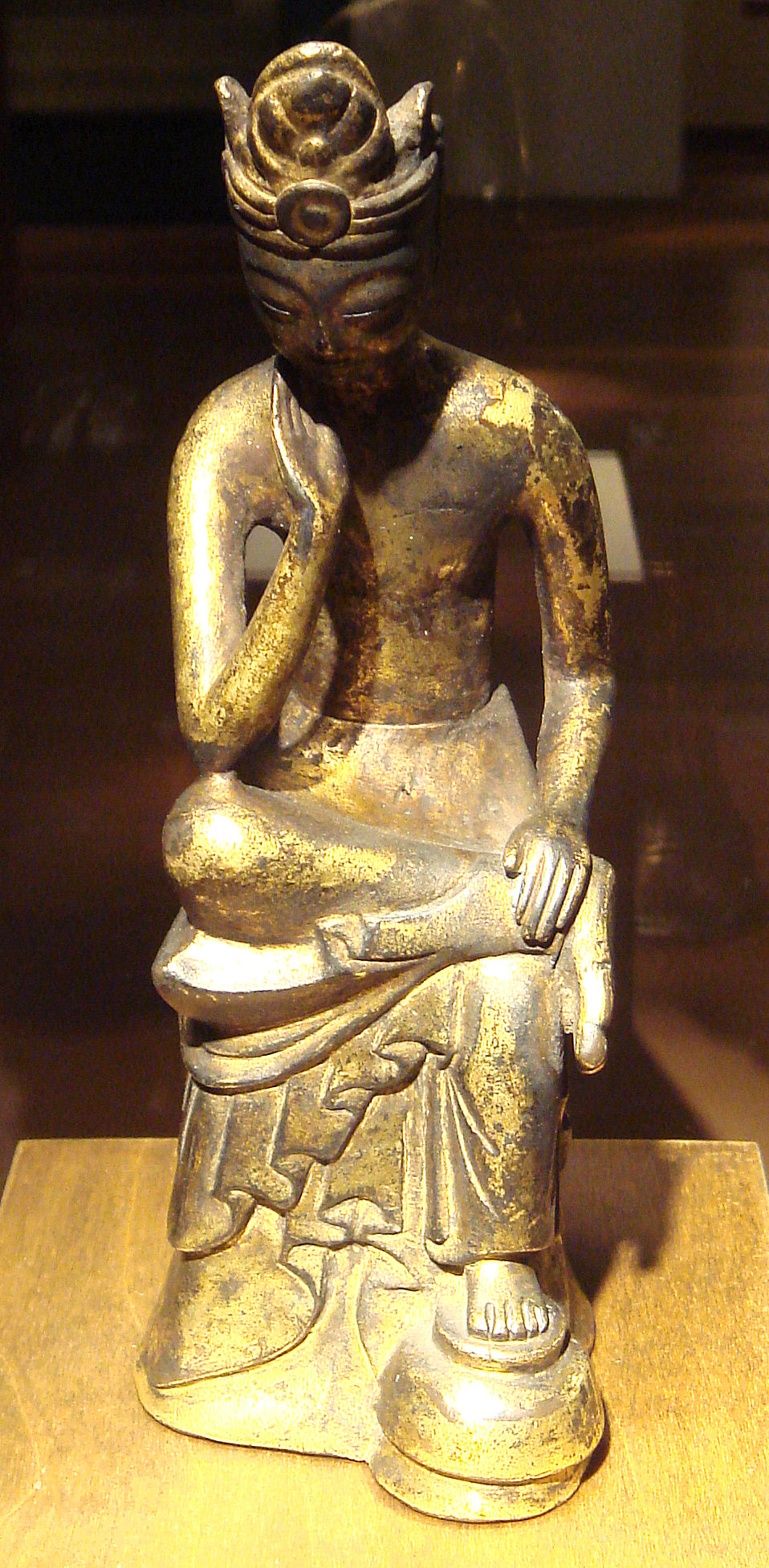
Seated Maitreya, Korean, 4–5th century CE, Guimet Museum

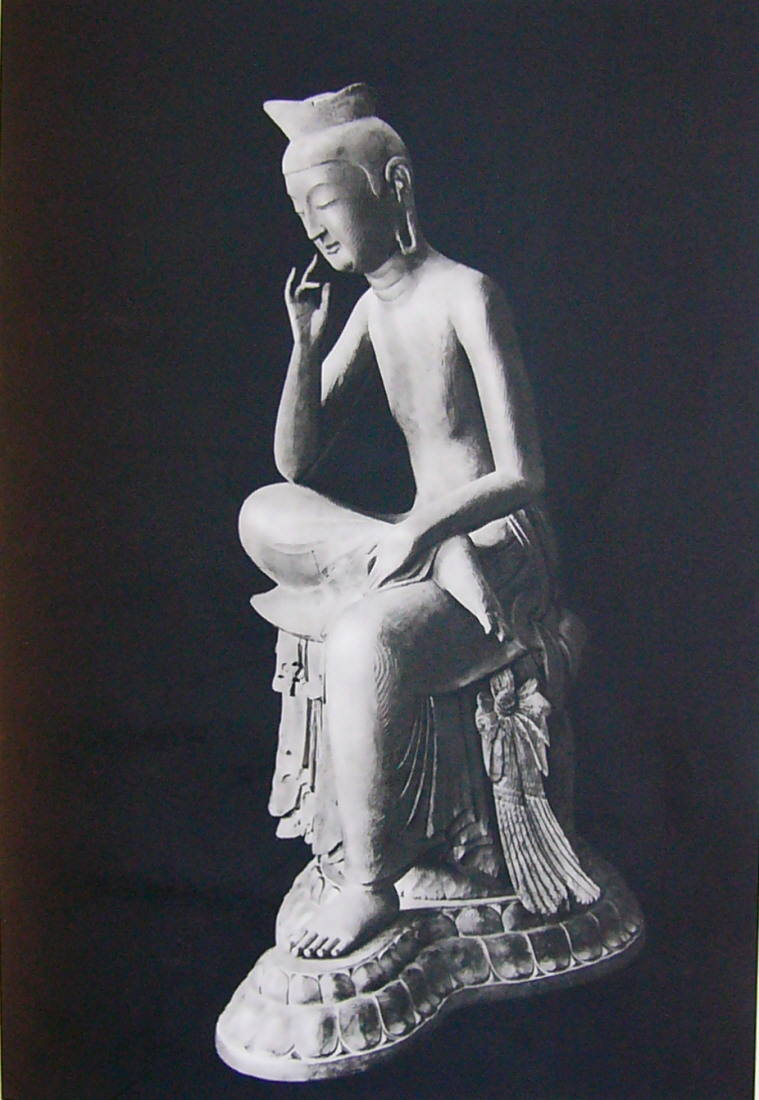
Seated Maitreya, Japan, Asuka period (538–710)

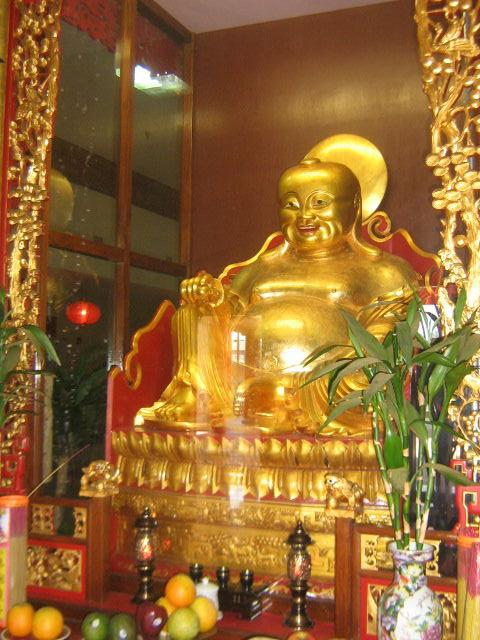
The monk Budai as an incarnation of Maitreya

Maitreya and disciples in Budai form, as depicted at the Feilai Feng grottos near Lingyin Temple in Hangzhou, China

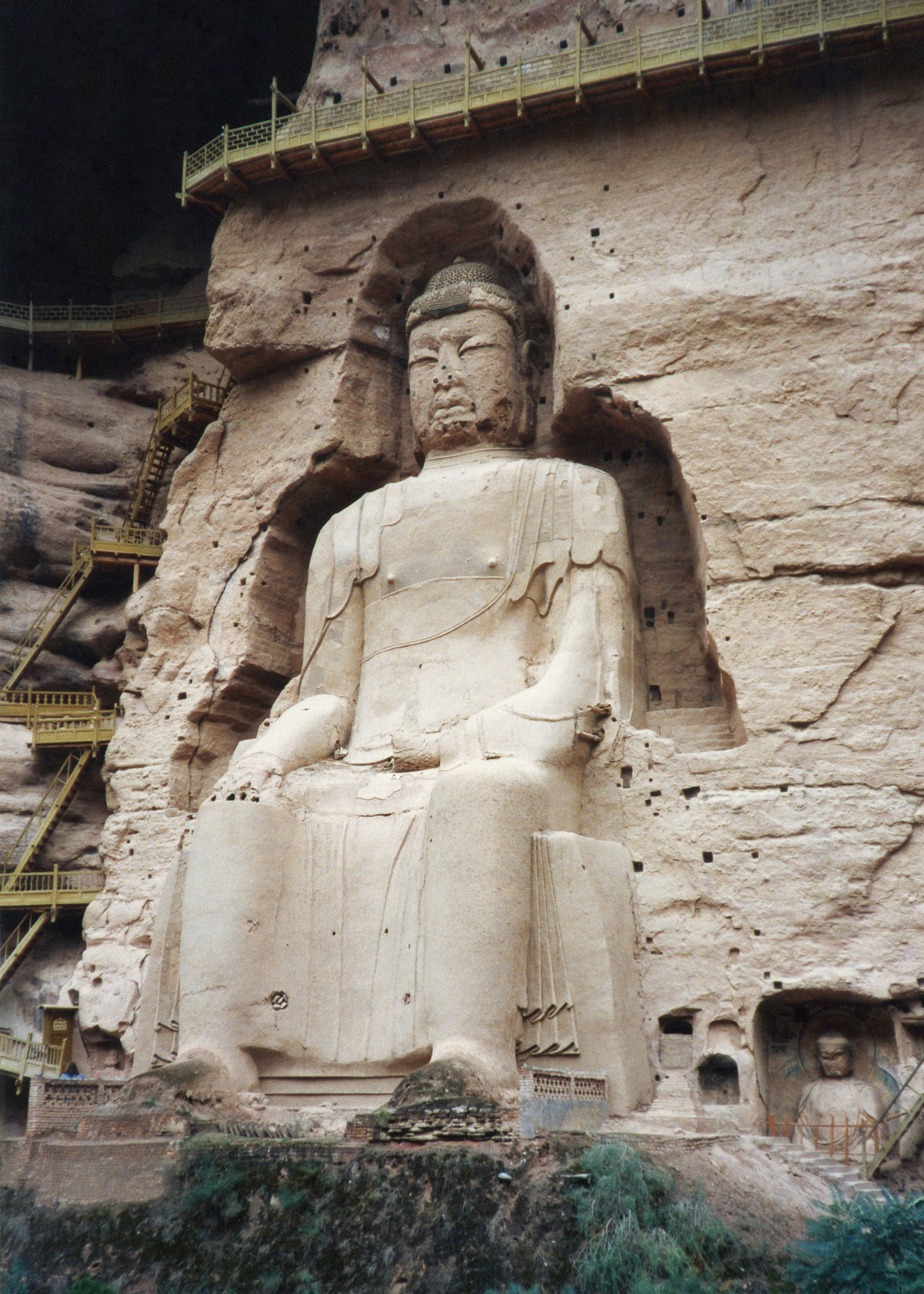
Monumental statue of Maitreya at Bingling Temple, China

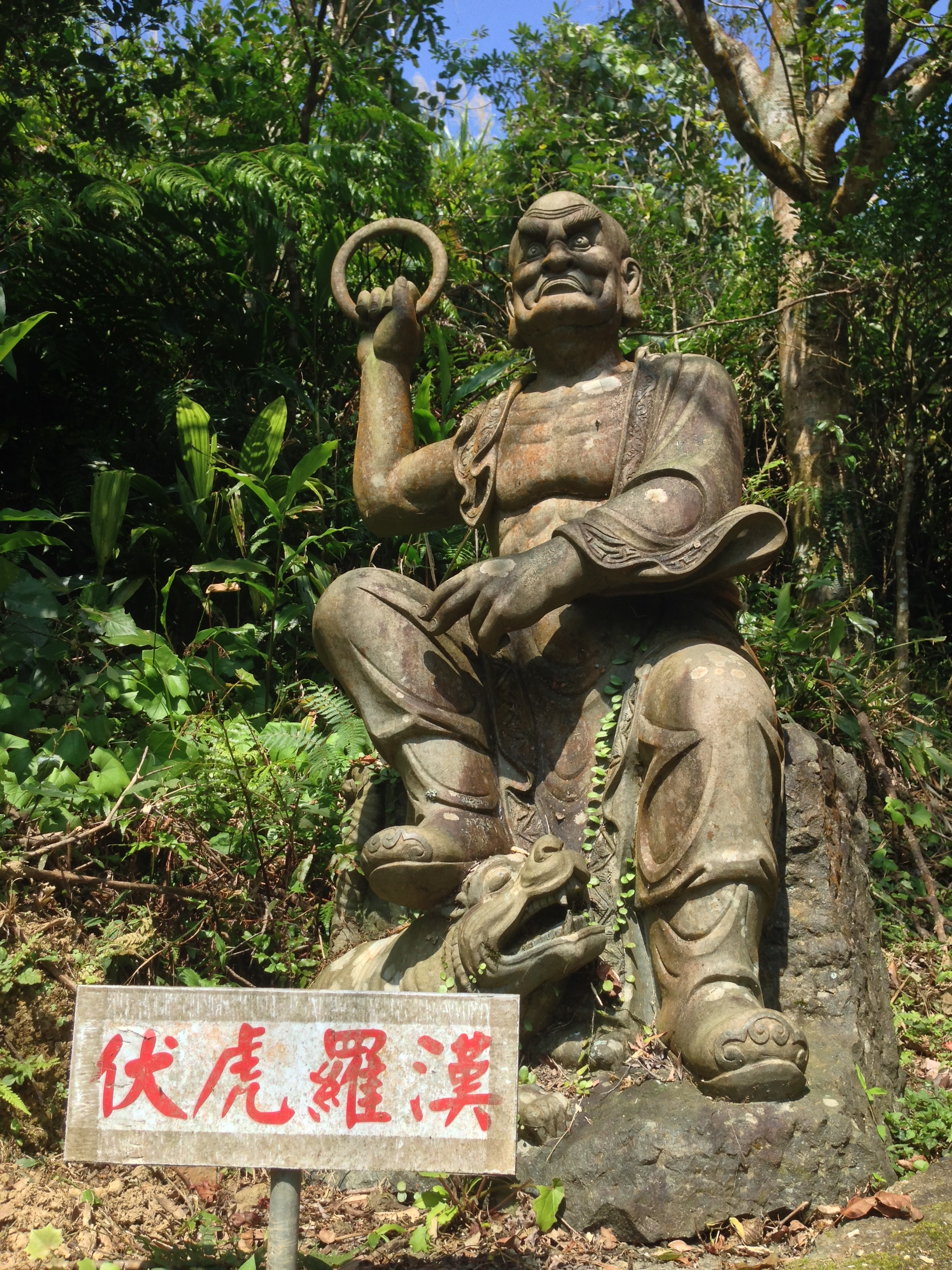
Statue of the Tiger Subduing arhat, believed to be an incarnation of Maitreya

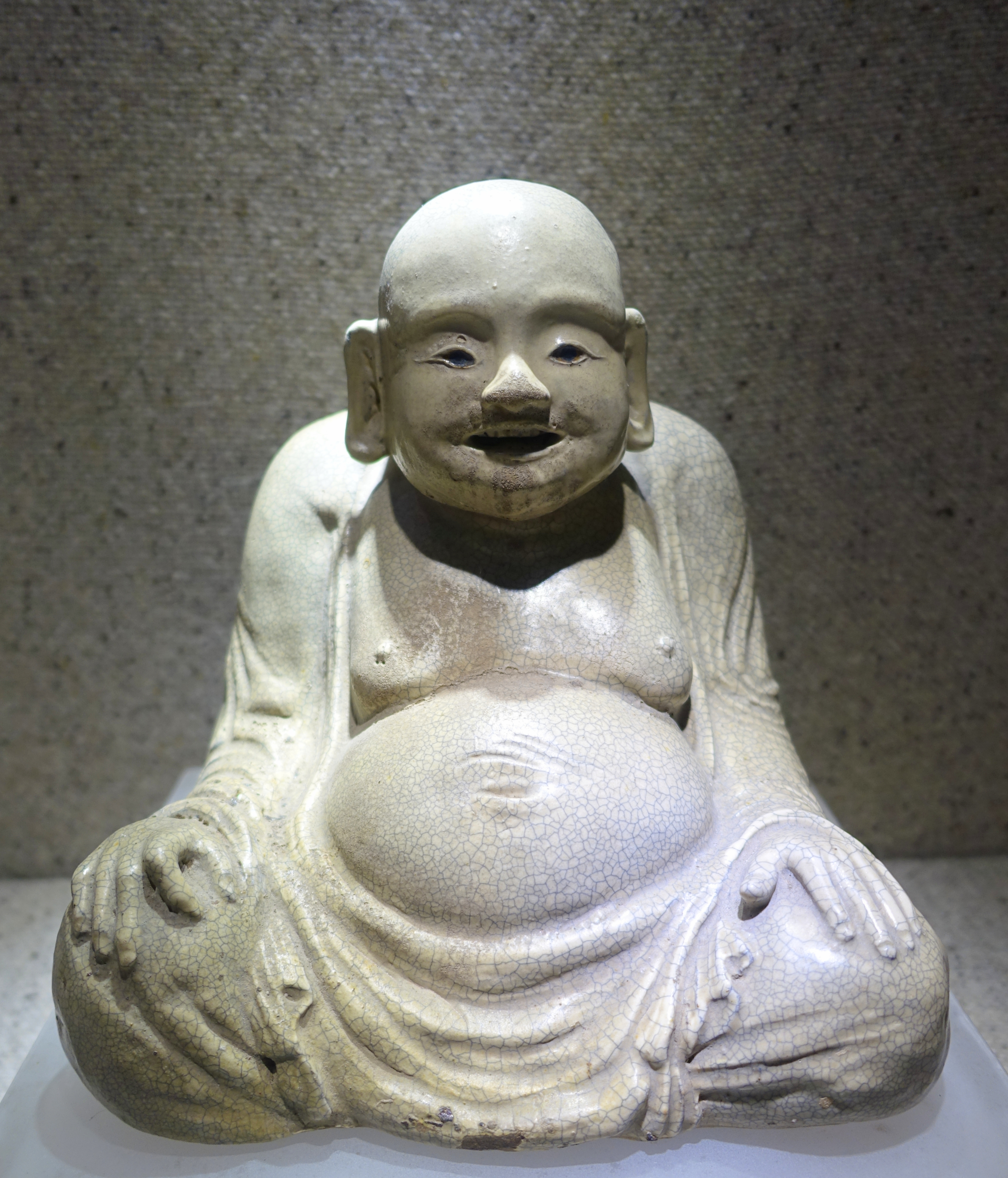
Maitreya figurine, Bát Tràng kiln, Hanoi, Revival Lê dynasty, 17th–18th century CE

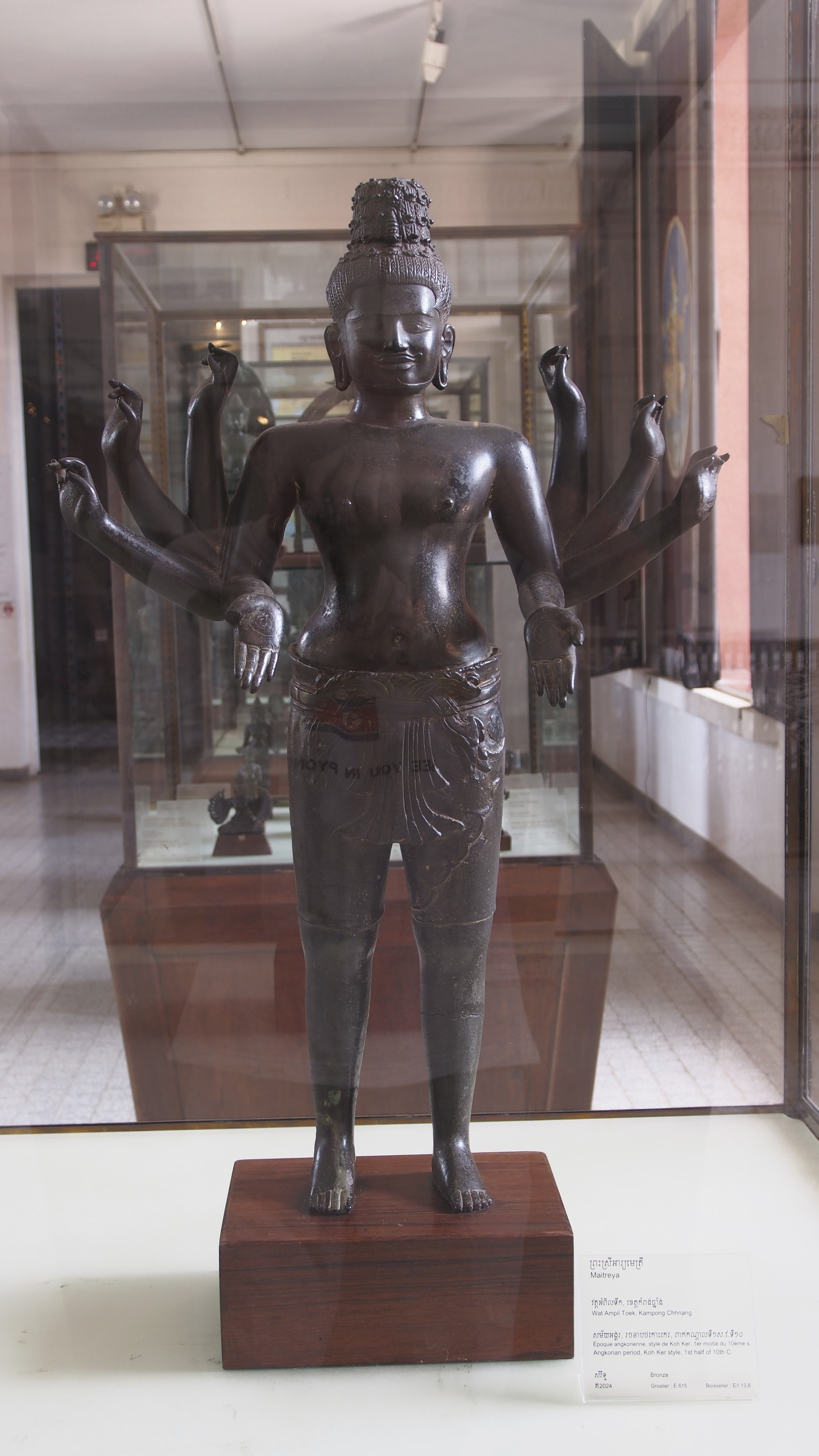
Eight-armed male deity (Maitreya). Provenance Vat Ampil Tok, Kg. Chhnang. 10th century. Bronze with dark patina. Green traces on the feet. H. 75 cm. Inv. 2024. National Museum of Cambodia. Phnom Penh.

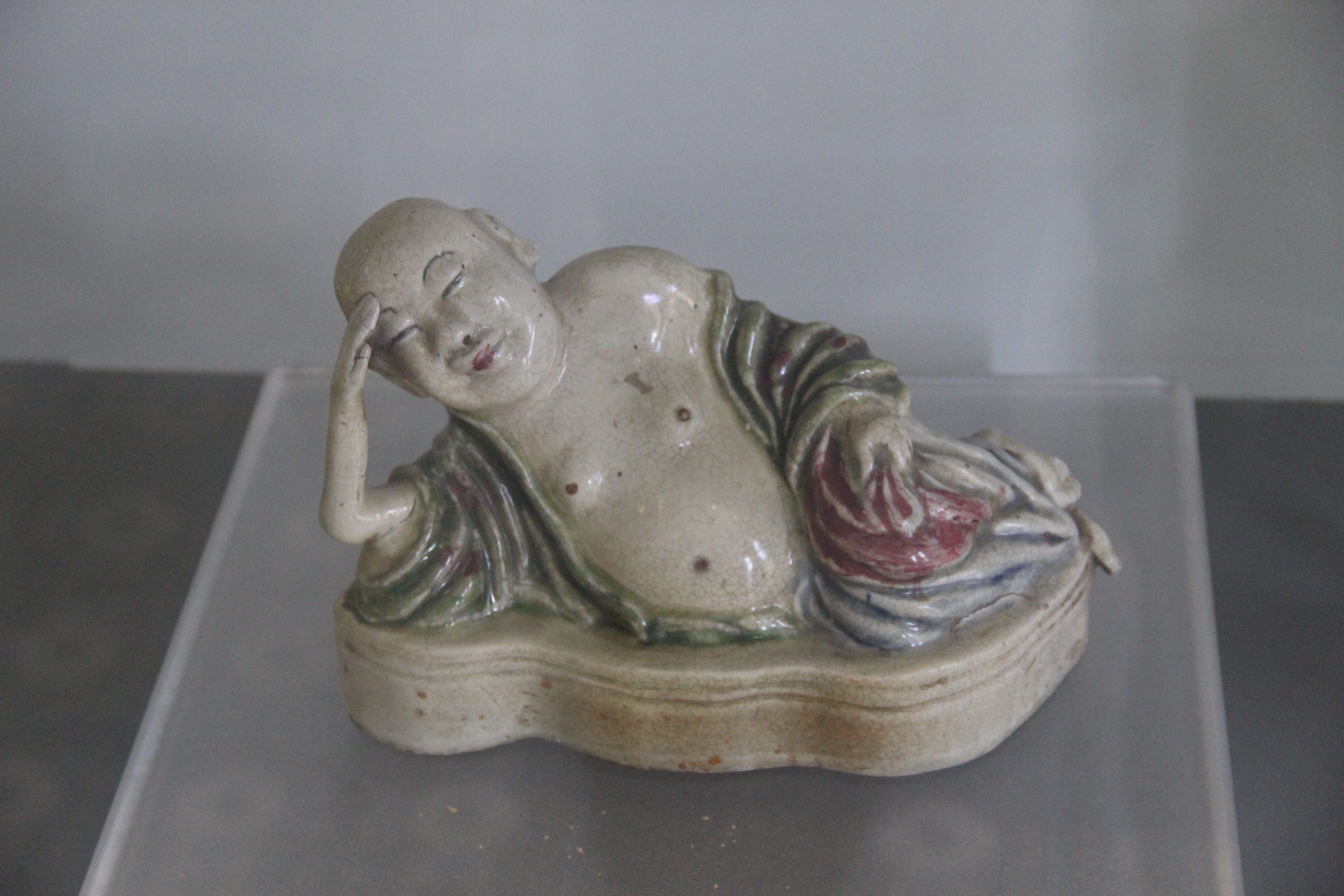
Maitreya figurine, Lái Thiêu kiln, HCMC, Nguyễn dynasty, 18th–19th century CE

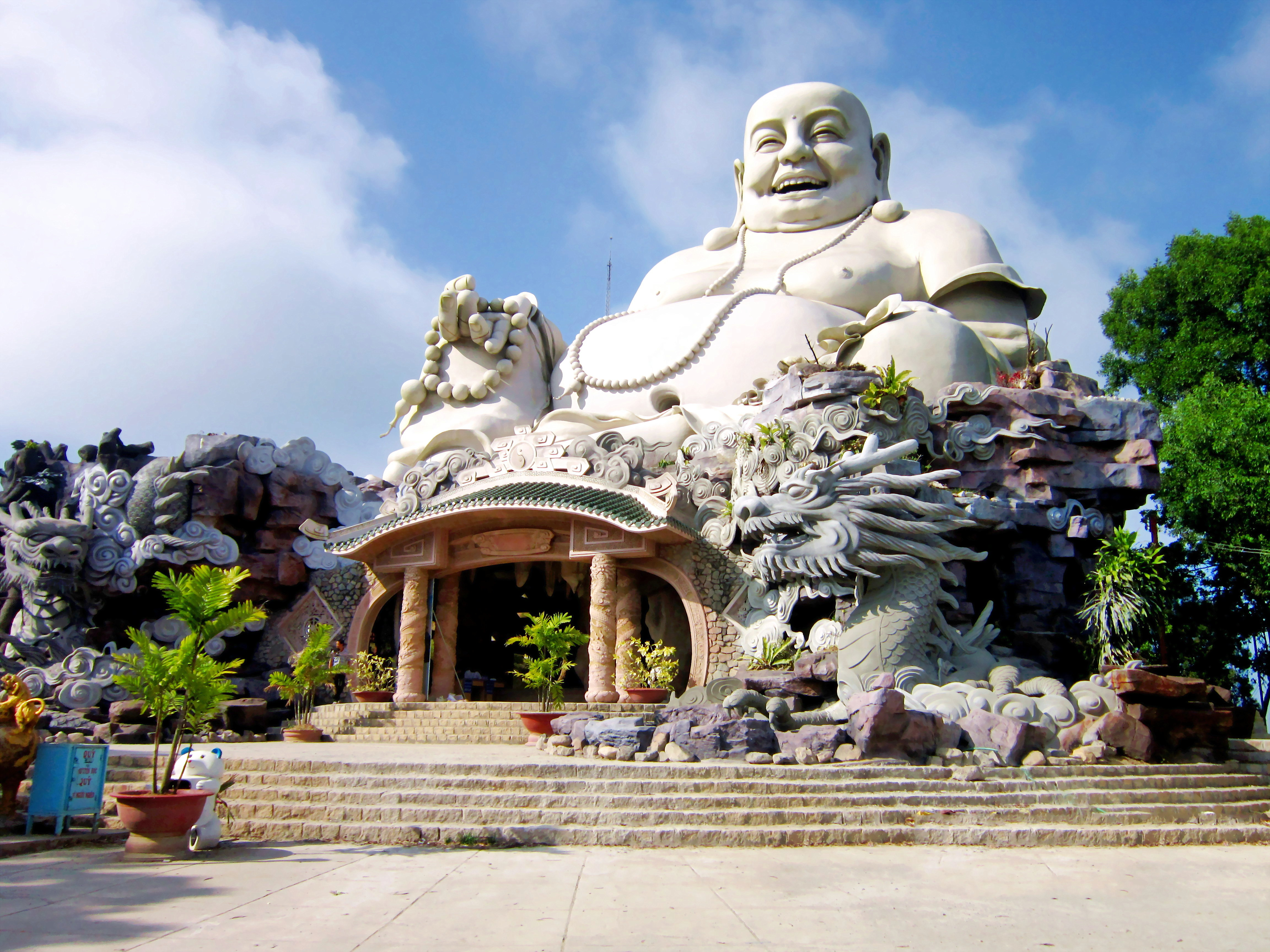
Statue of Maitreya in Budai form surrounded by a dragon on Cấm Mountains, Vietnam

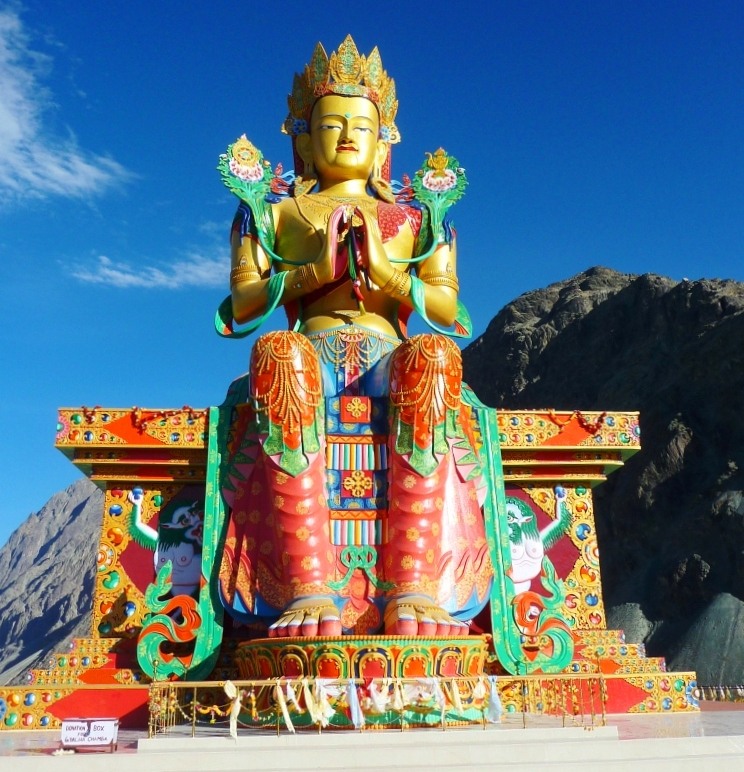
110 ft (35 metre) Maitreya Buddha facing down the Shyok River, Nubra Valley near Diskit Monastery

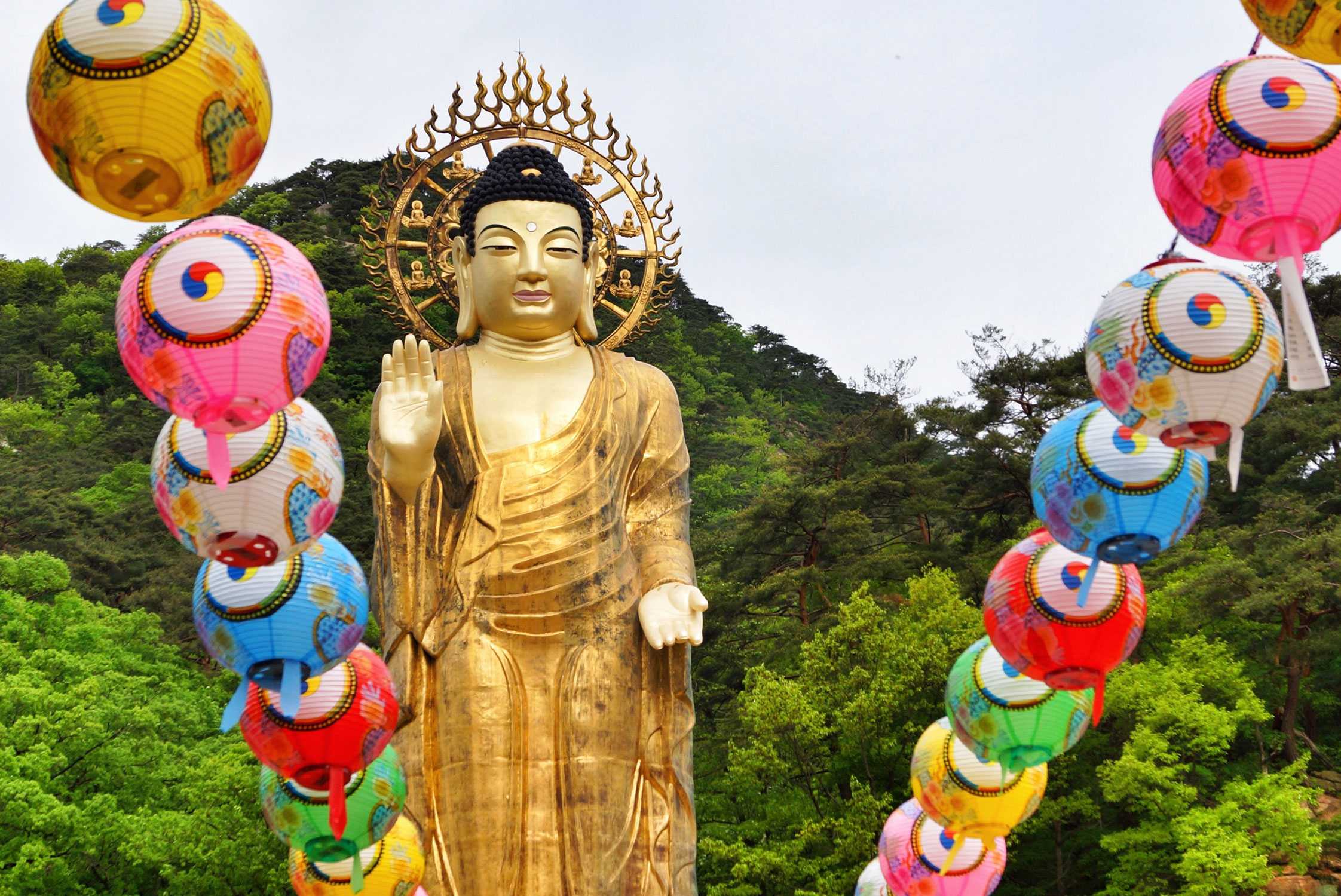
Golden Maitreya Statue rises just over 100 feet or 55 meters in the center of grounds of the temple Beopjusa, built in 1990

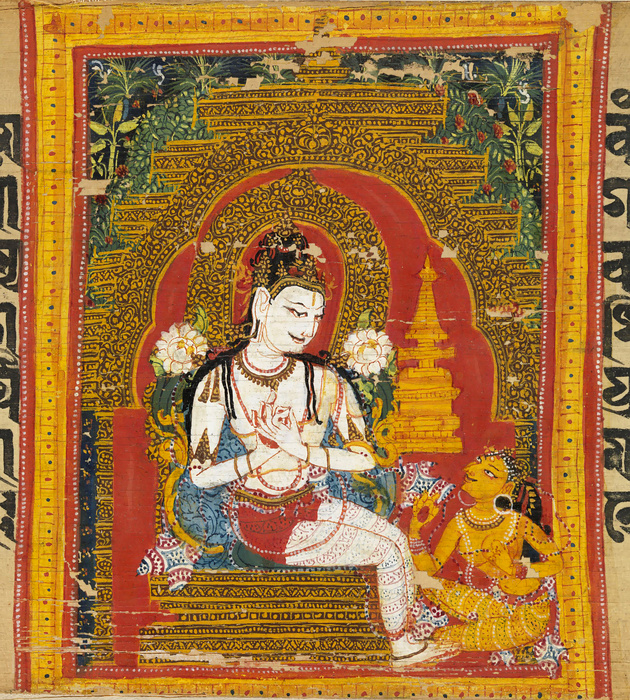
Painting depicting Maitreya, 12th century

== See also ==
- Baháʼu'lláh, similar eschatological figure in the Baháʼí Faith
- Budai, a traditional manifestation of Maitreya
- Christ, similar eschatological figure in Christianity
- History of Buddhism in India
  - Dalit Buddhist movement
  - Decline of Buddhism in the Indian subcontinent
  - Navayana
  - Spread of Buddhism
- Index of Buddhism-related articles
- Kalki
- Kalki Purana
- Leshan Giant Buddha
- Lord of Light
- Mahdi, similar eschatological and messianic figure in Islam.
- Maitreya (Benjamin Creme)
- Maitreya (Mahābhārata)
- Maitreya Project
- Maitreya (Theosophy)
- Messiah, similar eschatological figure in Christianity and Judaism
- Paraclete, similar eschatological figure in Christianity
- Saoshyant, similar eschatological figure in Zoroastrianism
- Secular Buddhism
