= Shedra =

Tibetan Buddhist religious college

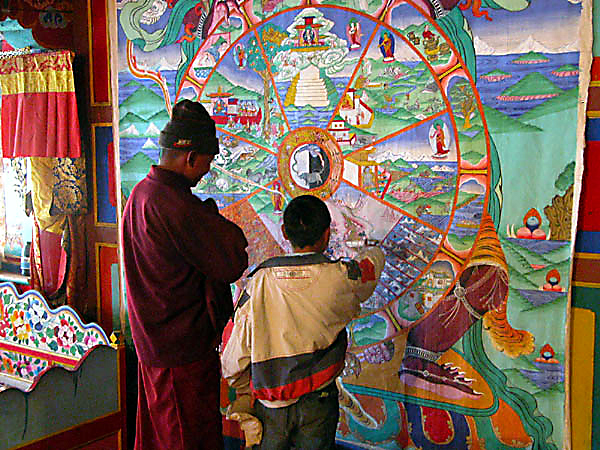
Monk teaching abhidharma

Shedra is a Tibetan word (Tibetan: བཤད་གྲྭ, Wylie: bshad grwa) meaning "place of teaching" but specifically refers to the educational program in Tibetan Buddhist monasteries and nunneries. It is usually attended by monks and nuns between their early teen years and early twenties. Not all young monastics enter a shedra; some study ritual practices instead. Shedra is variously described as a university, monastic college, or philosophy school. The age range of students typically corresponds to both secondary school and college. After completing a shedra, some monks continue with further scholastic training toward a Khenpo or Geshe degree, and other monks pursue training in ritual practices.

== Curriculum ==
The curriculum varies with the lineage and monastery but most cover the main foundational texts in the Tibetan Buddhist canon, such as the Mūlamadhyamakakārikā (The Fundamental Verses on the Middle Way) by Nagarjuna and the Madhyamakāvatāra (Entering the Middle Way) by Candrakīrti. Some non-Buddhist courses, such as grammar, poetry, history, and arts may be included. The initial years focus on the Buddhist sutras and the remaining years on tantras. Care is taken to introduce foundational topics first, building key concepts and vocabulary for later study.

Compared to western educational systems, the shedra places much greater emphasis on memorization by students. Some traditions require monks memorize complete texts before studying them. They may be required to recite in class the new sections they've memorized each day. In some lineages, debate becomes a major focus and practice for refining one's understanding. In those lineages students may spend a major portion of the day in debate with each other.

There are differing views on the importance of shedra. Gelug, Sakya and Jonang lineages consider the shedra training essential, whereas in the Nyingma and Kagyu lineages, this is less the case.

=== Five topics ===
Je Tsongkhapa, founder of the Gelug school, standardized the Tibetan Buddhist curriculum into five major topics, and this was later adopted by many other schools.

1. Pāramitās - study of Mahayana
2. Madhyamaka - philosophy
3. Pramana - logic and epistemology
4. Abhidharma - psychology
5. Vinaya - monastic rules

=== Nyingma lineage ===
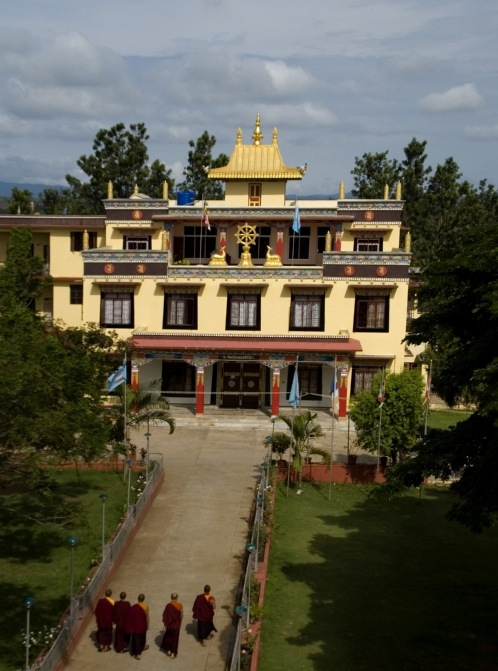
Monks entering the shedra at Namdroling

The shedra at Namdroling Monastery includes specific phases of study with particular texts used in each phase. Commentaries by Ju Mipham or Khenpo Shenga may be used with each text. The phases and texts include:

- First year
  - Training on the prātimokṣa, bodhisattva, and samaya vows using Treatise Ascertaining the Three Vows by Pema Wangyal
  - Bodhisattvacaryāvatāra by Shantideva
  - Grammar, Poetry, and History
- Second through fifth years
  - Psychology using Abhidharmakosha by Vasubandhu, Abhidharmasamuccaya by Asanga, and Pramanavarttika by Dharmakirti
  - Madhyamaka philosophy texts including Mūlamadhyamakakārikā, Chatuhshataka-shastrakarika (The Four Hundred Verses on the Middle Way) of Aryadeva, Madhyamakāvatāra, and Madhyamakalankara
- Upper phase
  - Yogacara philosophy using the five treatises of Maitreya via Asanga, including Gyulama (Mahayanottaratantrashastra or Ratnagotravibhāga), Abhisamayalankara, Mahāyāna-sūtrālamkāra-kārikā, Madhyānta-vibhāga-kārikā (Distinguishing the Middle from the Extremes) and Dharma-dharmatā-vibhāga (Distinguishing Phenomena and Pure Being)
  - Additional study on the vows and monastic discipline
- Tantra phase for two or three years
  - Specific tantras like the Guhyagarbha tantra
  - Dzogchen commentaries like Yonten Dzod by Jigme Lingpa, Rangdrol Korsum (Trilogy of Self Liberation), and Ngelso Korsum (Trilogy of Resting)
  - Additional study on the eight precepts of practice and related topics

=== Kagyu lineage ===
The following texts were recommended by the 16th Karmapa as the basis for study in the shedra at Rumtek Monastery:

- Vinaya, Abhidharma and Epistemology
  - Vinayamula Sutra by Gunaprabha with a commentary by Mikyö Dorje (8th Karmapa)
  - Abhidharmakosha by Vasubandhu with a commentary by Mikyö Dorje
  - Pramanavarttika by Dharmakirti with a commentary by Chödrak Gyatso (7th Karmapa)
- Madhyamaka
  - Madhyamakavatara by Chandrakirti with a commentary by Mikyö Dorje and another by Wangchuk Dorje (9th Karmapa)
  - Abhisamayalankara by Maitreya-Asanga with a commentary by Mikyö Dorje which includes commentary by Indian scholar Haribhadra.
- Tantra
  - Uttaratantra Shastra by Maitreya-Asanga with commentaries by Jamgon Kongtrul Lodro Thaye and another by Gölo Shönu Pal as a basis for studying buddha nature
  - Zabmo Nangdön by Rangjung Dorje (3rd Karmapa) with commentaries by Rangjung Dorje and Jamgon Kongtrul Lodro Thaye as a basis for tantra
  - Hevajra Tantra with commentaries by Jamgon Kongtrul Lodro Thaye and Dakpo Tashi Namgyal

=== Gelug lineage ===
The shedra system at Sera Monastery, now relocated to southern India from Tibet, has a twelve- to twenty-year curriculum organized in the five topics. The first five years are foundational and cover logic, epistemology, vinaya, and the terms and distinctions built upon in later philosophic study. The next four years are devoted to studying specific texts, including Candrakīrti's Madhyamakavatara, Maitreya's Abhisamayalankara, and Dharmakīrti's Pramanavarttika. The remaining four to eight years continue with Vasubandhu's Treasury of Manifest Knowledge and Gunaprabha's Vinayamula Sutra, and, for some students, study of Guhyasamāja tantra.

== History ==
Monastic education and a tradition of scholarship was not unique to Tibet, but was imported when Buddhism was brought from India initially by Shantarakshita. Major Buddhist universities such as Nalanda University existed as places for advanced studies in India up until the twelfth century.

== See also ==
- Bhiksu (disambiguation)
- Buddhist monasticism
- Greco-Buddhist monasticism
- Tibetan Buddhist canon
