= Bhūmi (Buddhism) =

Buddhist stages of enlightenment

In Mahayana Buddhism, bhūmi (Sanskrit; foundation, ground, level, stage, Chinese: 地) or bodhisattva-bhūmi refers to the progressive levels of spiritual development that a bodhisattva attains on the path to Buddhahood in Mahayana Buddhism. This idea is variously translated into English as "bodhisattva levels", "bodhisattva grounds", or "bodhisattva stages".

There are various schemas of bodhisattva bhūmis presented across the vast literature of Mahayana Buddhism. These bhūmi theories represent organized schemas for the bodhisattva path, each stage associated with specific virtues (like faith, merit, etc) and practices (like the pāramitās). Although the concept of bhūmi (as a stage of development) originates in earlier Buddhist traditions (for example, in the Śrāvakabhūmi it refers to the stages of Śrāvakas), Mahayana sutras like the Daśabhūmika Sūtra discuss it in the context of ten bodhisattva stages.

The ten bodhisattva stages are also called vihara ('dwelling') in some sources.

== Ten bhūmis ==
The Daśabhūmika Sūtra (as well as many other Mahayana sutras) refers to the following ten bhūmis.

1. The first bhūmi, the Very Joyous. (Skt. pramuditā), in which one rejoices at realizing a partial aspect of the truth;
2. The second bhūmi, the Stainless. (Skt. vimalā), in which one is free from all defilement;
3. The third bhūmi, the Light-Maker. (Skt. prabhākarī), in which one radiates the light of wisdom;
4. The fourth bhūmi, the Radiant Intellect. (Skt. arciṣmatī), in which the radiant flame of wisdom burns away earthly desires;
5. The fifth bhūmi, the Difficult to Master. (Skt. sudurjayā), in which one surmounts the illusions of darkness, or ignorance as the Middle Way;
6. The sixth bhūmi, the Manifest. (Skt. abhimukhī) in which supreme wisdom begins to manifest;
7. The seventh bhūmi, the Gone Afar. (Skt. dūraṃgamā), in which one rises above the states of the Two vehicles;
8. The eighth bhūmi, the Immovable. (Skt. acalā), in which one dwells firmly in the truth of the Middle Way and cannot be perturbed by anything;
9. The ninth bhūmi, the Good Intelligence. (Skt. sādhumatī), in which one preaches the Law freely and without restriction;
10. The tenth bhūmi, the Cloud of Doctrine. (Skt. dharmameghā), in which one benefits all sentient beings with the Law (Dharma), just as a cloud sends down rain impartially on all things.

=== The first bhūmi, the Very Joyous ===
The First bhūmi, called "Very Joyous", is attained with the first direct perception of emptiness (Śūnyatā) and is simultaneous with entry into the third of the five paths to awakening, the path of seeing. It is called "very joyous" because the bodhisattva works at the perfections of generosity and develops the ability to give away everything without regret and with no thought of praise or reward (for themselves). All phenomena are viewed as empty and as subject to decay, suffering, and death, and so bodhisattvas lose all attachment to them. According to Tsong Khapa, first level bodhisattvas directly understand that persons do not exist by way of their own nature. Due to this, they overcome the false idea that the five aggregates constitute a truly existent person. They also eliminate predispositions toward corrupted ethics so completely that they will not arise again.

As Candrakirti explains in his Madhyamakavatara, a bodhisattva who has entered the stages attains numerous amazing powers. On the first bhūmi, the bodhisattva is able to "(1) see one hundred buddhas, (2) be blessed by one hundred buddhas and understand their blessings, (3) live for one hundred eons, (4) see the past and future in those one hundred eons, (5) enter into and rise from one hundred samadhis, (6) vibrate one hundred worlds, (7) illuminate one hundred worlds, (8) bring one hundred beings to spiritual maturity using emanations, (9) go to one hundred buddhaksetras, (10), open one hundred doors of the doctrine (dharmaparyaya), (11) display one hundred versions of his body, and (12) surround each of those bodies with one hundred bodhisattvas."

Despite having directly and correctly perceived emptiness, bodhisattvas on the first level are primarily motivated by faith. They train in ethics in order to cleanse their minds of negativity and so they prepare themselves for the cultivation of mundane meditative absorption that comes on the second level.

=== The second bhūmi, the Stainless ===
Bodhisattvas on the second level, the "Stainless", perfect ethics and overcome all tendencies towards engagement in negative actions. Their control becomes so complete that even in dreams they have no immoral thoughts. According to Tsong Khapa for such a bodhisattva,

on all occasions of waking and dreaming his movements or activities of body, speech and mind are pure of even subtle infractions...he fulfills the three paths of virtuous actions-abandoning killing, stealing, and sexual misconduct-with his body; the middle four-abandons lying, divisive talk, harsh speech, and senseless chatter-with his speech; and the last three-abandoning covetousness, harmful intent, and wrong views-with his mind. Not only does he refrain from what is prohibited but he also fulfills all the positive achievements related to proper ethics.

And according to Nāgārjuna,

The second is called the Stainless
Because all ten [virtuous] actions
Of body, speech, and mind are stainless
And they naturally abide in those [deeds of ethics].
Through the maturation of those [good qualities]
The perfection of ethics becomes supreme.
They become Universal Monarchs helping beings,
Masters of the glorious four continents and of the seven precious objects.

Because of this, the bodhisattva's mind becomes purified and equanimous, which is a prerequisite for training in the four rūpadhyānas ("form" meditative absorptions i.e. those correlated with the form realm) and the four arūpadhyānas (formless absorptions).

=== The third bhūmi, the Light-Maker ===
Tsong Khapa states that the third bhūmi is called the "Light-Maker" because when it is attained "the fire of wisdom burning all the fuel of objects of knowledge arises along with a light which by nature is able to extinguish all elaborations of duality during meditative equipoise." Bodhisattvas on this level cultivate the perfection of patience. Their equanimity becomes so profound that

even if someone...cuts from the body of this bodhisattva not just flesh but also bone, not in large sections but bit by bit, not continually but pausing in between, and not finishing in a short time but cutting over a long period, the bodhisattva would not get angry at the mutilator.

The Bodhisattva realizes that his tormentor is motivated by afflicted thoughts and is sowing seeds of his own future suffering. As a result, the bodhisattva feels not anger, but a deep sadness and compassion for this cruel person, who is unaware of the operations of karma. Trainees on the third level overcome all tendencies toward anger, and never react with hatred (or even annoyance) to any harmful acts or words. Rather, their equanimity remains constant, and all sentient beings are viewed with love and compassion:

All anger and resentment rebound on the person who generates them, and they do nothing to eliminate harms that one has already experienced. They are counterproductive in that they destroy one's peace of mind and lead to unfavorable future situations. There is nothing to be gained through anger and resentment, revenge does nothing to change the past, and so the bodhisattva avoids them.

Bodhisattvas on this level also train in the four form meditations, the four formless meditations, and the four immeasurables, and the higher knowledges.

=== The fourth bhūmi, the Radiant Intellect ===
On the fourth level, the "Radiant Intellect", bodhisattvas cultivate the perfection of effort and eliminate afflictions. According to Wonch'uk, this level is so named because fourth bhumi bodhisattvas "constantly emit the radiance of exalted wisdom." He also cites Maitreya's Ornament for the Mahayana Sutras, which explains that bodhisattvas on this level burn up the afflictive obstructions and the obstructions to omniscience with the radiance of their wisdom. They enter into progressively deeper meditative absorptions and attain a powerful mental pliancy as a result. This eliminates laziness and increases their ability to practice meditation for extended periods of time. They destroy deeply rooted afflictions and cultivate the thirty-seven factors of awakening.

Through training in these thirty-seven practices, bodhisattvas develop great skill in meditative absorptions and cultivate wisdom, while weakening the artificial and innate conceptions of true existence.

=== The fifth bhūmi, Difficult to Master ===
The fifth level is called the "Difficult to Master" because it involves practices that are so arduous and require a great deal of effort to perfect. It is also called the "Difficult to Overcome" because when one has completed the training of this level one has profound wisdom and insight that are difficult to surpass or undermine. According to Nāgārjuna,

The fifth is called the Extremely Difficult to Overcome
Since all evil ones find it extremely hard to conquer him;
He becomes skilled in knowing the subtle
Meanings of the noble truths and so forth.

Bodhisattvas on this level cultivate the perfection of samadhi. They develop strong powers of meditative stabilization and overcome tendencies toward distraction. They achieve mental one-pointedness and they perfect calm abiding. They also fully penetrate the meanings of the Four Noble Truths and the two truths (conventional truths and ultimate truths) and perceive all phenomena as empty, transient and prone to suffering.

=== The sixth bhūmi, the Manifest ===
The sixth level is called the "Manifest" because the bodhisattva clearly perceives the workings of dependent arising and directly understands "the signless" (Mtshan ma med pa, Tibetan. Animitta, Sanskrit). The signless refers to the fact that phenomena seem to possess their apparent qualities by way of their own nature, but when one examines this appearance one realizes that all qualities are merely mentally imputed and not a part of the nature of the objects they appear to characterize.

As a result of these understandings bodhisattvas manifest meditative wisdom and avoid attachment to either cyclic existence or nirvana. Having overcome all attachments, bodhisattvas on this level can attain nirvana, but because of the force of the mind of awakening they decide to remain in the world in order to benefit other sentient beings. They cultivate the Perfection of Wisdom, through which they perceive all phenomena as lacking inherent existence, as being like dreams, illusions, reflections, or magically created objects. All notions of "I" and "other" are transcended, along with conceptions of "inherent existence" and "inherent nonexistence." These sixth-level bodhisattvas abide in contemplation of suchness, with minds that are undisturbed by false ideas.

=== The seventh bhūmi, the Gone Afar ===
Bodhisattvas on the seventh level develop the ability to contemplate signlessness uninterruptedly and enter into advanced meditative absorptions for extended periods of time, thus passing beyond both the mundane and supramundane paths of śrāvakas and Pratyekabuddhas (Hearers and solitary realizers). For this reason, this level is called the "Gone Afar." According to Nāgārjuna,

The seventh is the Gone Afar because
The number of his qualities has increased,
Moment by moment he can enter
The equipoise of cessation,

On this level bodhisattvas perfect their skill in means of meditation and practice (Thabs la mkhas pa, Tibetan; Upaya-Kausalya, Sanskrit), which is their ability to adapt their teaching tactics to the individual proclivities and needs of their audiences. They also develop the ability to know the thoughts of others, and in every moment are able to practice all the perfections. All thoughts and actions are free from afflictions, and they constantly act spontaneously and effectively for the benefit of others.

=== The eighth bhūmi, the Immovable ===
The eighth level is called the "Immovable" because bodhisattvas overcome all afflictions regarding signs and their minds are always completely absorbed in the dharma. At this level, a bodhisattva has achieved nirvana. According to Nāgārjuna,

The eighth is the Immovable, the youthful stage,
Through nonconceptuality he is immovable;
And the spheres of his body, speech and mind's
Activities are inconceivable.

Because they are fully acquainted with signlessness, their minds are not moved by ideas of signs. Eighth Bhumi bodhisattvas are said to be "irreversible", because there is no longer any possibility that they might waver on the path or backslide. They are destined for full buddhahood, and there are no longer any inclinations to seek a personal nirvana. They cultivate the "perfection of aspiration", which means that they undertake to fulfill various vows, due to which they accumulate the causes of further virtues. Although they resolve to work for the benefit of others and they pervade the universe with feelings of friendliness toward all sentient beings, these bodhisattvas have transcended any tendency to misunderstand anatta.

Their understanding of emptiness is so complete that it overturns innate delusions, and reality appears in a completely new light. They enter into meditation on emptiness with little effort. Bodhisattvas on this level are compared to people who have awakened from dreams, and all their perceptions are influenced by this new awareness. They attain the meditative state called "forbearance regarding non-arisen phenomena", due to which they no longer think in terms of inherent causes or inherent causelessness. They also develop the ability to manifest in various forms in order to instruct others. Compassion and skillful means are automatic and spontaneous. There is no need to plan or contemplate how best to benefit others, since bodhisattvas on the eighth level automatically react correctly to every situation.

=== The ninth bhūmi, the Good Intelligence ===
From this point on, bodhisattvas move quickly toward awakening. Before this stage, progress was comparatively slow, like that of a boat being towed through a harbour. On the eighth through tenth bhumi, however, bodhisattvas make huge strides toward buddhahood, like a ship that reaches the ocean and unfurls its sails. On the ninth level, they fully understand the three vehicles - hearers, solitary realizers, and bodhisattvas - and perfect the ability to teach the doctrine. According to the Sutra Explaining the Thought,

Because of attaining faultlessness and very extensive intelligence in terms of mastery of teaching the doctrine in all aspects, the ninth level is called the "Good Intelligence."

Ninth bhūmi bodhisattvas also acquire the "four analytical knowledges"-of fundamental concepts, meaning, grammar, and exposition. Due to this, they develop wondrous eloquence and skill in presenting doctrinal teachings. Their intelligence surpasses that of all humans and gods, and they comprehend all names, words, meanings, and languages. They can understand any question from any being. They also have the ability to answer them with a single sound, which is understood by each being according to its capacities. On this level they also cultivate the perfection of virya, which means that because of the strength of their mastery of the four analytical knowledges and their meditation they are able to develop paramitas energetically and to practice them continually without becoming fatigued.

=== The tenth bhūmi, the Cloud of Dharma ===
On the tenth bhūmi, bodhisattvas overcome the subtlest traces of the afflictions. Like a cloud that pours rain on the earth, these bodhisattvas spread the dharma in all directions, and each sentient being absorbs what it needs in order to grow spiritually. Thus Nāgārjuna states that

The tenth is the Cloud of Dharma because
The rain of excellent doctrine falls,
The Bodhisattva is consecrated
With light by the Buddhas.

At this stage bodhisattvas enter into progressively deeper meditative absorptions and develop limitless powers with regard to magical formulas. They cultivate the perfection of exalted wisdom, which, according to Asaṅga, enables them to increase their exalted wisdom. This in turn strengthens the other perfections. As a result, they become established in the joy of the doctrine.

They acquire perfect bodies, and their minds are cleansed of the subtlest traces of the afflictions. They manifest in limitless forms for the benefit of others and transcend the ordinary laws of time and space. They are able to place entire world systems in a single pore, without diminishing them or increasing the size of the pore. When they do this, the beings inhabiting the worlds feel no discomfort, and only those who are advanced bodhisattvas even notice.

Bodhisattvas on this level receive a form of empowerment from innumerable buddhas. This is called "great rays of light", because the radiance of these bodhisattvas shines in all directions. This empowerment helps them in removing the remaining obstructions to omniscience and gives them added confidence and strength. At the final moment of this stage they enter into a meditative state called the "vajralike meditative stabilization", in which the subtlest remaining obstacles to buddhahood are overcome. They arise from this concentration as Buddhas.

== Six bhūmis in the Yogācārabhūmi ==
The Yogacara compendium of yogic praxis, the Yogācārabhūmi, contains a subsection on the bodhisattva path (the Bodhisattvabhūmi), which lists a different set of six bhūmis:

1. The bhūmi of practicing with ascertainment (adhimukticaryābhūmi, shèngjiě xíng dì 勝解行地, mos pas spyod pa'i sa),
2. The bhūmi of pure exalted conviction (śuddhādhyāśayabhūmi, jìng shèngyìyào dì 淨勝意樂地, lhag pa'i bsam pa dag pa'i sa),
3. The bhūmi of accomplishing practices (caryāpratipattibhūmi, xíng zhèngxíng dì 行正行地, spyod la 'jug pa'i sa),
4. The bhūmi of certainty (niyatabhūmi, duò juédìng dì 墮決定 地, nges par gyur pa'i sa),
5. The bhūmi of practicing with certainty (niyatacaryābhūmi, juédìng xíng zhèngxíng dì 決定行正行地, nges pa'i spyod pa'i sa)
6. The bhūmi of reaching perfection (niṣṭhāgamanabhūmi, dào jiūjìng dì 到究竟地, mthar thug par 'gyur ba'i sa).

== Five paths and ten stages ==
In some Mahayana sources, the ten bodhisattva bhūmis are often categorized with or merged into, the separate schema of the "five paths". The main ideas of this schema were inherited by Yogacara from the Sarvāstivāda Vaibhāṣika Abhidharma texts as well as Vasubadhu's Abhidharmakośakārikā (AKBh). This schema continues to be developed in Yogacara texts like Asanga's Mahāyānasaṃgraha (MS), where it is given a more Mahayanist explanation and becomes tied to the bodhisattva path and the bhūmis.

The Five Paths (pañcamārga, Wylie Tibetan lam lnga), are:

1. Saṃbhāra-mārga (path of accumulation, tshogs lam), which includes two sub-divisions, Puṇya-bhāgīya and Mokṣa-bhāgīya (The state leading up to release). According to Vasubandhu's AKBh, in this path, one practices morality and contentment, learns and reflects on the teaching, keeps themselves free from unwholesome thinking, and practices the four foundations of mindfulness. In the Tibetan tradition, persons on the path are said to possess a strong desire to overcome suffering, either their own or others and renounce the worldly life.
2. Nirveda-bhāgīya (The state leading up to penetration) or Prayoga-mārga (The path of preparation, sbyor lam). According to the AKBh, in this stage, one observes the four noble truths in terms of its sixteen aspects. In the Tibetan tradition, this path is when one begins to practice meditation and gains analytical knowledge of emptiness.
3. Darśana-mārga (The path of seeing or insight, mthong lam). According to the AKBh, in this path one continues to observe the four noble truths until one realizes it and abandons eighty eight afflictions (kleshas). In Asanga's MS, this stage is when one realizes that all things are mere mental presentations (vijñapti matra), which leads to the first instance of the turning of the basis (āśraya-parāvṛtti). In the Tibetan tradition, this is when one practices samatha and realizes emptiness directly.
4. Bhāvanā-mārga, (The path of cultivation, sgom lam). According to the AKBh, in this stage, one continues to practice and abandons 10 further kleshas. In the MS, one practices in this stage by applying the antidotes (pratipakṣa) to all of the obstructions (sarvā varaṇa) and continues the process of the turning of the basis (āśraya-parāvṛtti).
5. Aśaikṣā-mārga (The path of no more learning or consummation, mi slob pa’i lam or thar phyin pa'i lam) also known as Niṣṭhā-mārga (in the MS). Persons on this path have completely freed themselves of all obstructions and afflictions and are thus perfected or fulfilled (niṣṭhā). According to the MS, one has achieved the bodies of a Buddha.

According to the Tibetan Buddhist explanation of this schema, passage through the grounds and paths begins with bodhicitta, the wish to reach Buddhahood so as to liberate all sentient beings. Aspiring Bodhicitta becomes Engaging Bodhicitta upon actual commitment to the bodhisattva vows. With these steps, the practitioner becomes a bodhisattva, and enters upon the paths.

Before attaining the ten stages, the bodhisattva traverses the first two of the five Mahayana paths (the path of accumulation and the path of preparation). The classic ten stages of the bodhisattva are grouped within the three subsequent paths:

1. The 1st Bhūmi corresponds to the path of seeing (darśana-mārga)
2. Bhūmis 2 to 7 correspond to the path of cultivation (bhāvanā-mārga)
3. Bhūmis 8 to 10 are within the path of no more learning (aśaikṣā-mārga)

Mahayana literature often features an enumeration of "two obstructions" (Wylie: sgrib gnyis):

1. The "obstructions of delusive emotions" (Sanskrit: kleśa-varaṇa, Wylie: nyon-mongs-pa'i sgrib-ma)
2. The "obstructions to knowledge" (Sanskrit: jñeyāvaraṇa, Wylie: shes-bya'i sgrib-ma).

According to one interpretation, the obstruction of delusive emotions is overcome at the attainment of the path of seeing, and the obstructions to knowledge are overcome over the course of the path of cultivation. However, this is not a statement agreed upon by all Buddhist schools, e.g. Korean Son's Kihwa states that the obstructions to knowledge are overcome by the 10th bhumi.

== East Asian system of fifty-two stages ==
The standard presentation of the bodhisattva path in East Asian Buddhism is the system of the fifty two bodhisattva stages. This schema of fifty two bodhisattva stages relies on sources like the Buddhāvataṃsaka Sūtra, the Benevolent Kings Sūtra and the Bodhisattvas’ Diadem Primary Activities Sūtra (Pusa yingluo benye jing 菩薩瓔珞本業經). This system is followed by the Huayan school and since it is also explained by Zhiyi, it was adopted into the Tiantai school. It is also mentioned by other East Asian traditions, like Pure Land and Chinese Mantrayana, even if they hold that one can skip these stages through their special methods.

A basic outline of these fifty two stages are as follows:

- the ten stages of faith (shixin 十信): 1. the stage of faith (xinxin 信心), 2. the stage of mindfulness (nianxin 念心), 3. the stage of endeavor (jingjin xin 精進心), 4. the stage of mental stability (dingxin 定心), 5. the stage of the wisdom of understanding emptiness (huixin 慧心), 6. the stage of pure self-restraint (jiexin 戒心), 7. the stage of the returning of merit (huixiang xin 廻向心), 8. the stage of maintaining the dharma within oneself (hufa xin 護法心), 9. the stage of detachment (shexin 捨心), and 10. the stage of aspiration (yuanxin 願心).
- the ten abodes (shizhu 十住): 1. arousing bodhicitta, 2. putting things in order, 3. practice, 4. nobility of spiritual rebirth, 5. perfection of expedient means, 6. rectification of the mind, 7. non-retrogression, 8. childlike goodness, 9. prince of truth, and 10. coronation (abhiseka).
- the ten practices (shixing 十行): 1. joyful, 2. beneficial, 3. unobstructed, 4. unwavering, 5. unconfused, 6. attractive, 7. unattached, 8. hard-won, 9. exemplary, and 10. true.
- the ten merit transferences (shihuixiang 十迴向): 1. saving all beings yet free from the form of all beings; 2. not destroying [phenomenal distinctions while realizing the non-substantiality of all distinctions]; 3. equality with all the buddhas; 4. reaching every corner of the universe [to pay homage to all the buddhas]; 5. a treasury of inexhaustible merit [accumulated from the above practices to be used for the salvation of others]; 6. entering into the “good root” of non-differentiation; 7. treating all beings as equally deserving; 8. the form of suchness [seen underlying all phenomenal distinctions]; 9. being liberated without restraints or attachments [though realizing that all things are one]; and 10. penetrating into the infinitude of every single thing.
- the ten bhūmis of the Daśabhūmika Sūtra (shidi 十地) as explained above.
- Preliminary Enlightenment (dengjue 等覺), a bodhisattva who has cut off one part of fundamental ignorance, also called the vajra mind
- Marvellous Enlightenment (miaojue 妙覺) or Supreme Enlightenment which has fully cut off all ignorance, i.e. Full Buddhahood

Huayan masters like Fazang do not understand this process in a linear manner, since each of these stages and practices are all said to be interfused with each other and with Buddhahood itself. As such, each stage contains all the other stages, including Buddhahood. In explaining this Huayan theory of the bodhisattva path, Imre Hamar writes:

The Buddhāvataṃsaka-sūtra is said to describe the religious practice in fifty two stages, starting from initial faith up to complete enlightenment. It provides a gradual path to enlightenment. However, one passage of the sūtra says that at the stage of initial faith the bodhisattva experiences complete enlightenment. This sudden enlightenment seems to be in contradiction with the gradual path of fifty two stages. Fazang and Chengguan solved this contradiction by explaining the stages from two aspects: gradual (cidi xingbu 次第行布) and mutual interfusion (yuanrong xiangshe 圓融相攝). Chengguan, influenced by Chan Buddhism, proposed four models of cultivation and enlightenment. He emphasised the importance of gradual cultivation even after the sudden enlightenment, which became the standard model for his disciple Zongmi. The famous Huayan lay hermit Li Tongxuan stressed the importance of faith in the identity of living beings with Buddha. His teaching had a great impact on the development of Chan Buddhism.

== In Vajrayana Buddhism ==
Various Vajrayana and Dzogchen lineages of tantra recognize either thirteen or sixteen bhumis.

The additional bhumis in one Vajrayana system include:

- eleventh bhumi of Universal Light
- twelfth bhumi of the Lotus of Nonattachment
- thirteenth bhumi of the Vajra Holder.

Another system of Dzogchen presents sixteen bhumis:

- eleventh bhumi of Universal Radiance/Light
- twelfth bhumi of the Lotus of Nonattachment
- thirteenth bhumi of the Gatherings of Rotating Syllables
- fourteenth bhumi of the Great Samadhi
- fifteenth bhumi of the Vajra Holder
- sixteenth bhumi of the Unexcelled Wisdom

== See also ==
- Buddhist paths to liberation
