= Buddhist Doctrinal Classification =

Classifications of Buddhist teachings in Mahayana

Buddhist Doctrinal Classification refers to various systems used by Mahāyāna Buddhist traditions to classify and organize the numerous texts and teachings that have developed over the history of Buddhism. According to buddhologist Peter Gregory, these classification systems fulfill three interwoven roles for Buddhist traditions: hermeneutical, sectarian, and soteriological. From an hermeneutical standpoint, they function as a method of organizing Buddhist texts both chronologically and hierarchically, thereby producing a doctrinal structure that is internally coherent and logically consistent. In its sectarian application, different Buddhist schools evaluate and order scriptures based on their own doctrinal priorities, using this to legitimize their specific traditions. From a soteriological perspective, classification schemas map out a graded path of spiritual development, wherein the practitioner's insight evolves from basic teachings toward the most advanced and profound realizations.

One of the earliest such systems was the "Three Turnings of the Wheel of Dharma" (Sanskrit: tridharmacakra-pravartana, Tibetan: chos kyi 'khor lo gsum), an Indian Mahāyāna Buddhist framework for classifying and understanding the teachings of the Buddhist Sūtras and the teachings of Buddha Śākyamuni. This classification system first appears in the Saṃdhinirmocana Sūtra and in the works of the Yogācāra school. According to the three turnings schema, the Buddha's first sermons, as recorded in the Tripiṭaka of early Buddhist schools, constitute the "first turning" (which include all śrāvakayāna texts). The sūtras which focus on the doctrine of emptiness (śūnyatā) like the Prajñāpāramitā Sūtra corpus, are considered to comprise the "second turning" (which in this schema is considered provisional), and the sūtras which teach Yogācāra themes (especially the three natures doctrine), like the Saṃdhinirmocana Sūtra, comprise the final and ultimate "third turning".

This and other similar classification systems later became prevalent in various modified forms in Tibetan Buddhism as well as in East Asian Buddhism. In East Asian Buddhism, doctrinal classification systems, called "panjiao" (判教), were developed in nearly all major Chinese Buddhist schools. Tibetan Buddhism generally uses the term "classification of tenets" (Sanskrit: siddhānta, Tibetan: grub mtha'), which is also a name for a whole genre of literature that focuses on this topic.

== Indian theories ==
The idea of classifying various doctrines and teachings has its antecedents in Early Buddhist texts such as the Tevijja sutta and the Brahmajala sutta. These early Buddhist sources discuss the various worldviews of brahmins, sramanas and ascetics during the Buddha's time, explaining why they are inadequate and why the Buddha's teaching is superior to them.

Earlier Mahayana Sutras mostly discuss the Buddha's teachings in two main categories: Hinayana ("Small" or "Lesser" vehicle) or Śrāvakayāna and the Mahayana or Vaipulya (Expansive) teachings. The schema of the three vehicles (yanas) is also another early classification scheme, which contains three main vehicles to awakening: Śrāvakayāna, Pratyekabuddhayāna and Mahayana. Some sutras complicate this classification however. Perhaps the most famous example is the Lotus Sutra, which teaches that the Buddha taught three vehicles only provisionally. In reality, they are ultimately a single teaching, the all inclusive One Vehicle (Skt.: ekayāna, Ch.:一乘; yīchéng).

=== The Three Turnings ===
The Saṃdhinirmocana Sūtra is the first work to introduce the "three turnings of the wheel of Dharma" schema, which became the normative classification system in the Yogācāra school.

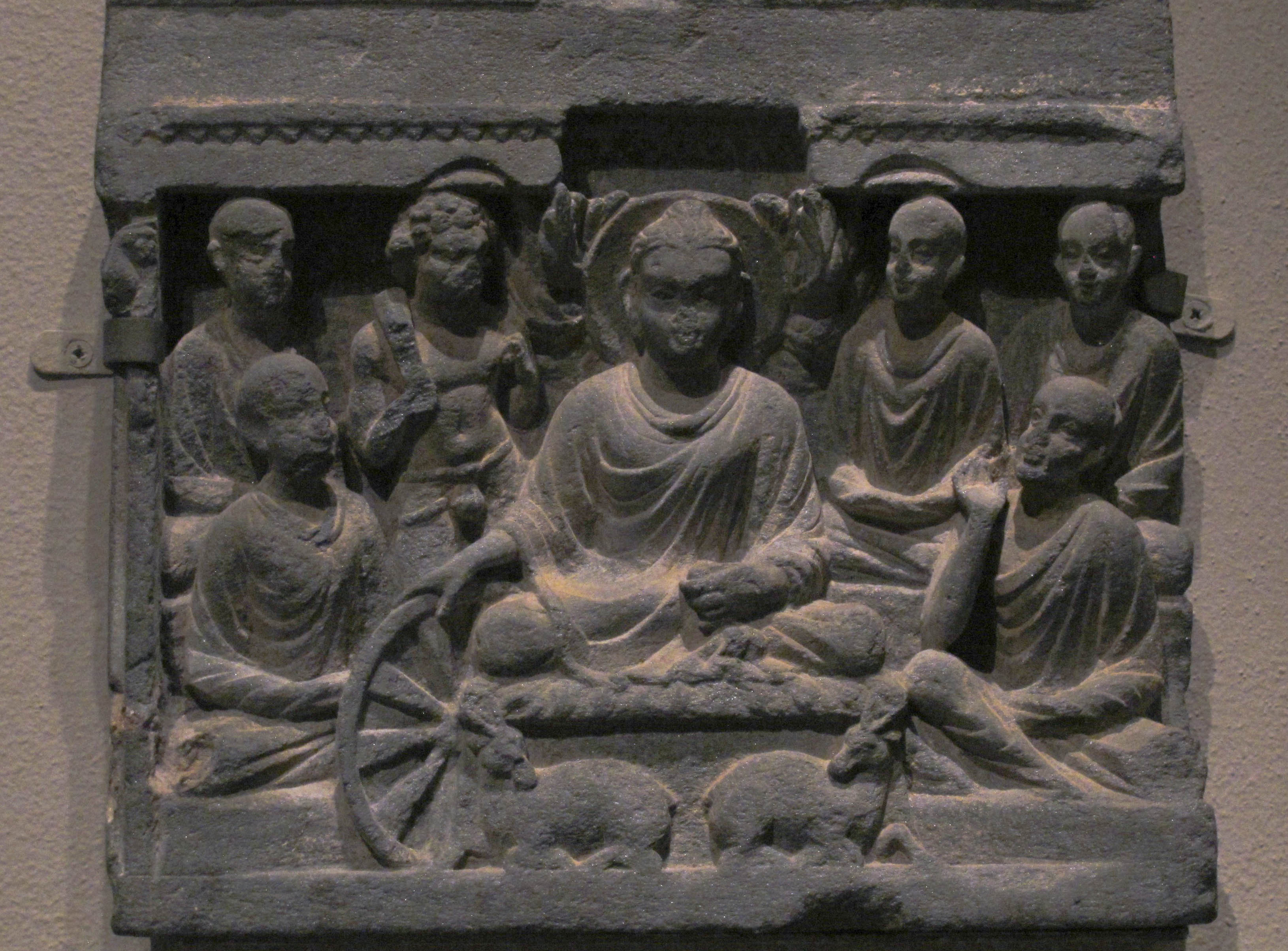
A second century Gandharan depiction of the Buddha's first sermon at Sarnath (in which he taught the Dharmacakrapravartana Sūtra).

==== First Turning ====
The first turning is traditionally said to have taken place at Deer Park in Sarnath near Varanasi in northern India. It consisted of the teaching of the four noble truths, dependent arising, the five aggregates, the sense fields, not-self, the thirty seven aids to awakening and all the basic Buddhist teachings common to all Buddhist traditions and found in the various Sutrapitaka and Vinaya collections. These teachings are known as the "Hinayana" teachings (lesser or small vehicle) in Mahayana. In East Asian Buddhism, it is called "the teaching of existence" (有相法輪) since it discusses reality from the point of view of phenomena (dharmas) which are explained as existing.

The Abhidharma teachings of the various śrāvakayāna (i.e. non-Mahayana) traditions (such as Vaibhasika and Theravada) are generally also placed into this category.

==== Second Turning ====
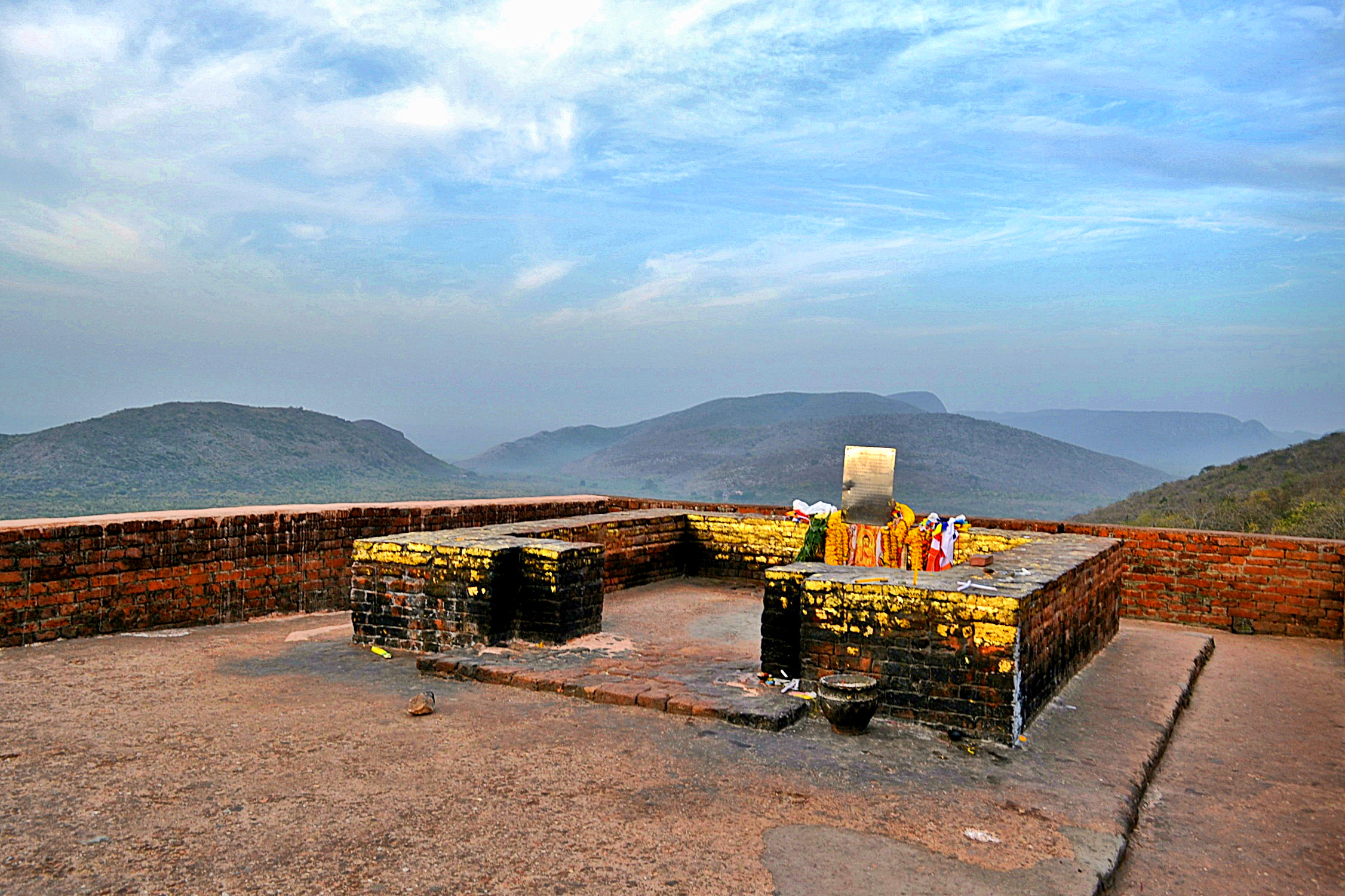
Vulture Peak (Gṛddhakūṭa) where some of the second turning sutras like the Prajñāpāramitā sutras are said to have been taught.

The second turning is said to have taken place at Vulture Peak Mountain in Rajagriha, in Bihar, India. The second turning emphasizes the teachings of emptiness (Skt: śūnyatā) and the bodhisattva path. The main sutras of this second turning are considered to be the Prajñāpāramitā sutras. In East Asian Buddhism, the second turning is referred to as "the teaching that the original nature of all things is empty, that signs are not ultimately real" (無相法輪).

The second turning is also associated with the bodhisattva Manjushri. The analytical texts of the Madhyamaka school of Nagarjuna are generally included under the second turning.

==== Yogācāra sources ====
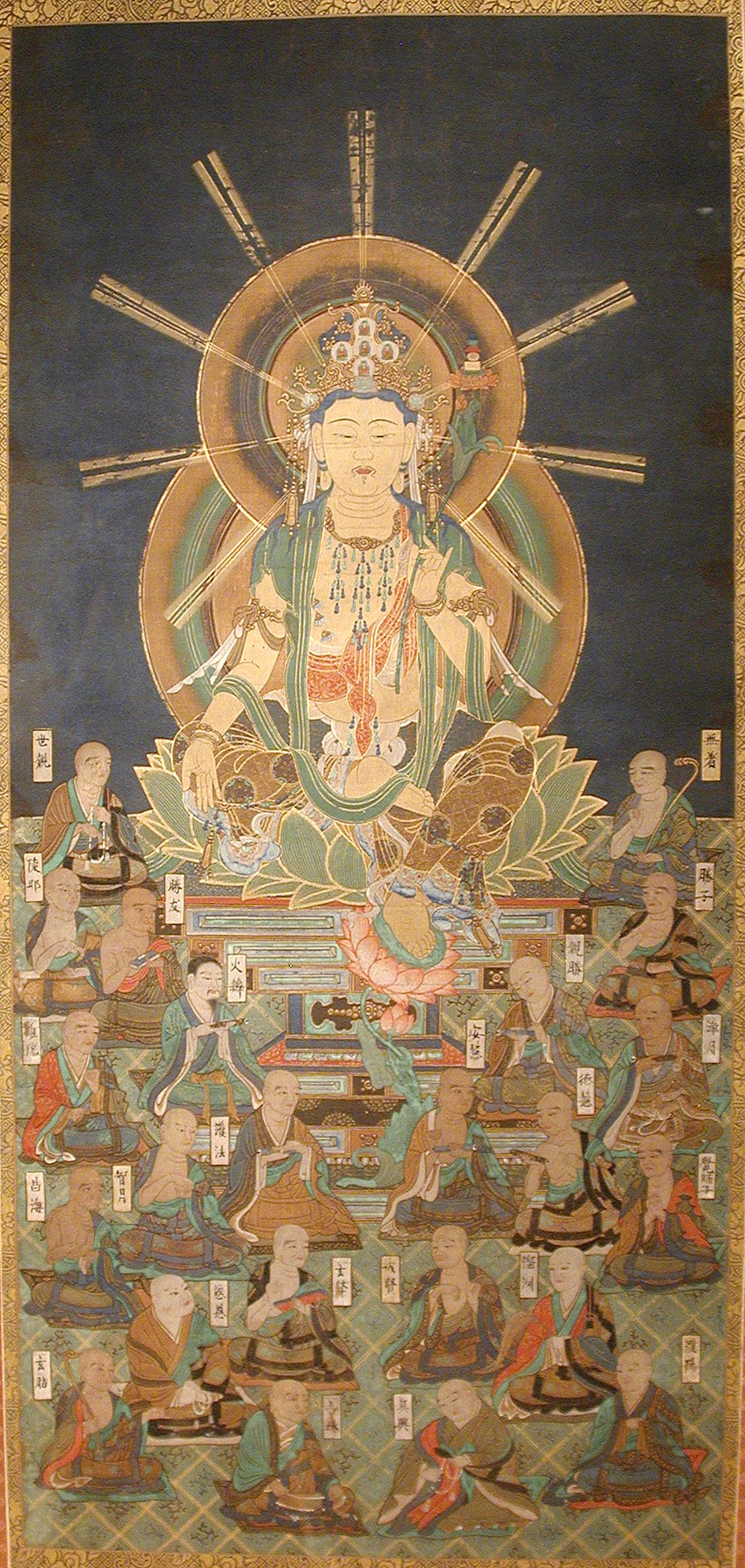
16th century Japanese scroll of bodhisattva Maitreya, who is considered to be an important source for the third turning teachings.

The first sutra source which mentions the "three turnings" is the Ārya-saṃdhi-nirmocana-sūtra (Noble sūtra of the Explanation of the Profound Secrets), the foundational sutra of the Yogācāra school. Major ideas in this text include the storehouse consciousness (ālayavijñāna), and the doctrine of cognition-only (vijñapti-mātra) and the "three natures" (trisvabhāva). The Saṃdhinirmocana affirms that the teachings of the earlier turnings authentic but are also incomplete and require further clarification and interpretation. According to the Saṃdhinirmocana, the previous two turnings all had an "underlying intent" which refers to the three natures (and their threefold lack of essence), the central doctrine of the third turning.

The Saṃdhinirmocana also claims that its teachings are the ultimate and most profound truth which cannot lead to a nihilistic interpretation of the Dharma which clings to non-existence (unlike the second wheel, which can be misinterpreted in a negative way) and is also incontrovertible and irrefutable (whereas the second wheel can be refuted). As such, the third turning is also called "the wheel of good differentiation" (suvibhakta), and "the wheel for ascertaining the ultimate" (paramartha-viniscaya). In East Asian Buddhism, the third turning is referred to as “ultimate turn of the Dharma wheel” (無上法輪).

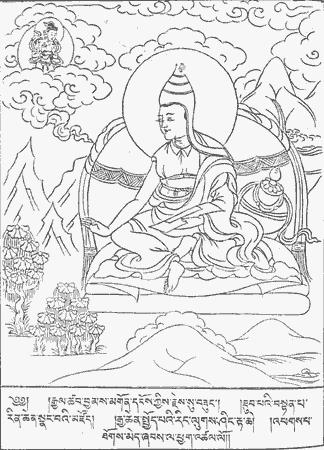
Tibetan depiction of Asanga receiving teachings from Maitreya.

Other Mahāyāna sutras are considered to be associated with the Yogācāra school, and thus, with the third turning (though these sutras themselves do not mention "three turnings"). These include the Laṅkāvatāra Sūtra and the Ghanavyūha Sūtra, both of which discuss Yogācāra topics like the ālayavijñāna, the three natures and mind-only idealism as well as tathāgatagarbha ideas.

The teachings of the third turning are further elaborated in the numerous works of Yogācāra school masters like Asaṅga, Vasubandhu, Sthiramati, Dharmapāla, Śīlabhadra, Xuanzang, Jñānaśrīmitra and Ratnākaraśānti.

In his Commentary on Distinguishing the Middle from the Extremes (Madhyāntavibhāga-bhāṣya), Vasubandhu comments on the three turnings and how they relate to the three natures. According to Vasubandhu, the first turning teaches the non-existence of the self (atman) through an analysis of the five aggregates. The second turning then establishes how the very (false) appearance of a (non-existent) self comes about from its aggregate parts through dependent arising. The third turning then, explains the fundamental nature of emptiness itself, which is how the non-existence of the self exists, i.e. the existence of the non-existent as explained by the three natures. In this sense, the ultimate truth in the third turning is said to be both existent and non-existent.

In his Commentary on the Cheng weishi lun (成唯識 論述記; Taishō no. 1830), Kuiji (a student of Xuanzang), lists the following as the most important sutras for the Yogācāra school:

1. Buddhāvataṃsaka Sūtra (華嚴)
2. Saṃdhinirmocana Sūtra (深密)
3. *Tathāgata-utpāda-guṇa-alaṃkāra-vyūha (如來出現功德莊嚴)
4. Mahayana-abhidharma-sutra (阿毘達磨)
5. Laṅkāvatāra Sūtra (楞迦)
6. Ghanavyūha Sūtra (厚嚴)

In Chinese Yogācāra, important treatises for the third turning included the Yogācārabhūmi-śastra, Xuanzang's Cheng Weishi Lun, and the Daśabhūmikasūtraśāstra (Shidi jing lun 十地經論, T.26.1522, also called Dilun), which is Vasubandhu's commentary on the Daśabhūmika-sūtra (Shidi jing 十地經).

=== Buddha-nature teachings ===
The Indian Yogācāra tradition eventually developed various works which synthesized Yogācāra with the tathāgatagarbha thought found in various Mahayana sutras. This synthesis merged the tathāgatagarbha teaching with the doctrine of the ālayavijñāna and the three natures doctrine. Some key sources of this Indian tendency are the Laṅkāvatāra Sūtra, Ghanavyūha Sūtra, and the Ratnagotravibhāga.

This Yogācāra-Tathāgatagarbha tradition became influential in East Asian Buddhism and in Tibet. The translator Paramārtha (499-569 CE) was known for promoting this syncretic Yogācāra and for defending the theory of the "stainless consciousness" (amala-vijñāna), which is revealed once the ālaya-vijñāna is purified.

As noted by Jan Westerhoff, the identification of buddha-nature teachings with the Yogācāra's third turning happened not only because several sutras (like the Laṅkāvatāra) explicitly synthesized the two doctrines, but also because:

the notion of the tathāgatagarbha lines up more naturally with the characterization of ultimate reality we find in Yogācāra than with what we find in Madhyamaka. The latter's characterization of ultimate reality in terms of emptiness is primarily a negative one, it describes it in terms of what is not there (a substantially existent core, svabhava), while the former's is more positive, postulating a foundational consciousness that is the source of all appearance.

Due to the influence of Yogācāra-Tathāgatagarbha thought, some Buddhist traditions also consider the tathāgatagarbha (also known as buddha-nature) teachings as part of the third turning. For example, the Jonang master Dölpopa Shérap Gyeltsen (1292–1361) held that the Tathāgatagarbha sutras contained the "final definitive statements on the nature of ultimate reality, the primordial ground or substratum beyond the chain of dependent origination."

For Dölpopa, some of the key “sutras of definitive meaning” included: the Śrīmālādevī Siṃhanāda Sūtra, Tathāgatagarbha Sūtra, Mahāyāna Mahāparinirvāṇa Sūtra, Aṅgulimālīya Sūtra, Ghanavyūha Sūtra, Buddhāvataṃsakasūtra, Laṅkāvatāra Sūtra, and the Saṃdhinirmocana Sūtra. Dölpopa's classification of Tathāgatagarbha sutras was influential on numerous later Tibetan authors. The Rime master Jamgon Kongtrul (1813–1899) also held that these buddha-nature sutras belonged to the definitive third turning.

The teachings found in several of the "treatises of Maitreya", such as the Madhyāntavibhāgakārikā, Ratnagotravibhāga and the Dharmadharmatāvibhāga are also considered to be part of the third turning by several schools of Tibetan Buddhism. Furthermore, in Tibetan Buddhism, Buddhist tantra and its associated scriptures are sometimes considered to also be part of the third turning.

=== Definitive and provisional ===
The schema of the three turnings found in Yogācāra texts identify Yogācāra teachings as the final and definitive interpretation of the Buddha's teaching. However, the schema was later adopted more widely, and different schools of Buddhism, as well as individual Buddhist thinkers, give different explanations as to whether the second or third turnings are "definitive" (Skt: nītārtha) or "provisional" or "implicit" (Skt: neyārtha, i.e. requiring interpretation). In the context of Buddhist hermeneutics, "definitive" refers to teachings which need no further explanation and are to be understood as is, while "implicit" or "provisional" refers to teachings which are expedient and useful but must be further interpreted and drawn out.

In the Tibetan tradition, some schools like Nyingma hold that the second and third turnings are both definitive. Nyingma works tend to emphasize the complementarity of the second and third turning teachings. Meanwhile, the Gelug school considers only the second turning as definitive. The Gelug founder Tsongkhapa rejected the definitive nature of the Yogācāra texts and instead argued that the definitive sutras are only those which teach emptiness as the ultimate meaning. On this, he relies on the Teachings of Akshayamati Sutra. The Jonang school on the other hand, see only the third turning sutras as definitive, and hold the texts of the second turning as provisional.

=== Other Indian sources ===
Other Mahāyāna sutras also mention a similar idea of the Buddha teaching in different phases, some which are provisional and others which are considered final. The Dhāraṇīśvararāja sūtra (also known as the Tathāgatamahākaruṇānirdeśa), mentions that it is part of the “irreversible turning” and uses the metaphor of the gradual process of refining beryl to describe the way the Buddha teaches in three phases of teaching: 1. "discourses on impermanence, suffering, no self, and unattractiveness, which provoke revulsion", 2. "discourses on emptiness, signlessness, and wishlessness" and finally 3. "discourses known as The Irreversible Wheel of the Dharma and The Purification of the Triple Sphere." Tibetan exegesis has generally seen this passage as referring to the three turnings (though the sutra itself does not use this terminology). The Dhāraṇīśvararāja is also important because it is a key source for the Ratnagotravibhāga, an influential buddha-nature focused treatise.

The Mahāyāna Mahāparinirvāṇa Sūtra states that its teachings are the highest and ultimate Dharma. It also states that teachings on not-self and emptiness are provisional skillful means. The Mahāparinirvāṇa Sūtra considers the highest teachings to be those of the "vaitulya" ("well-balanced", or "extensive") Mahāyāna sūtras (such as the Mahāparinirvāṇa itself) which teach the eternal nature of the Tathagata, and how "all living beings possess buddha-nature."

The sutra also contains a passage which outlines a rough system of teachings from coarse to subtle, comparing the teachings to the process of making ghee from milk. This passage was influential in East Asian Buddhist classification systems, entering mainstream Chinese Buddhist scholarship with work of Zhiyi. The passage states:

From the cow there comes milk, from milk comes cream, from cream come butter curds, from butter curds comes butter, and from butter comes ghee. . . . Oh sons of good family, it is also thus with the Buddha [and his teaching]. From the Buddha come the twelve divisions of scripture, from the twelve divisions of scripture come the sūtras, from the sūtras come the vaipulya [Mahāyāna] sūtras, from the vaipulya sūtras comes Perfection of Wisdom, and from Perfection of Wisdom comes Mahāparinirvāṇa, which is to be compared to ghee. Ghee is analogous to the Buddha-nature.

Buddhist scholastic literature also discusses and classifies numerous Buddhist and non-Buddhist views. Indian works which discuss and classify various competing doctrines include the Kathavatthu, the Mahavibhasa, Bhaviveka's Blaze of Reasoning and Shantaraksita's Tattvasamgraha.

== East Asian classification systems (panjiao) ==
The classification of Buddhist teachings or "doctrinal taxonomies" (Chinese: 判教 panjiao) became a central feature of East Asian Buddhist scholasticism and doctrinal debate. By 600 AD there were 10 main classifications. The term is a shortened form of jiāoxiāng pànshì 教相判釋, referring to the systematic classification of Buddhist teachings based on factors such as thematic content and historical period. This form of doctrinal organization was typically carried out by exegetes who aimed to reconcile the wide variety of Buddhist scriptures by integrating them into a unified doctrinal framework.

However, these classifications often reflected the exegete's own institutional affiliations, with commentators generally promoting the teachings of their own tradition as central or supreme. The practice of doctrinal classification was a central feature of scriptural interpretation among the scholastic Buddhist traditions in China during the 5th to 8th centuries, particularly within schools such as Faxiang (法相), Tiantai (天台), and Huayan (華嚴). Notable figures associated with this method include Huiyuan (慧遠), Zhiyi (智顗), Fazang (法藏), and Zongmi (宗密).

=== East Asian Madhyamaka school ===
The Sanlun (Madhyamaka) school divided the teaching into three turnings of the wheel of Dharma, but with different definitions for each. This system was outlined by Jizang and consists of the following schema:

1. The root wheel of the Avatamsaka sutra.
2. The branch wheel of Hinayana and Mahayana texts (the Āgama, Vaipulya, and Prajñāpramita sūtras)
3. The wheel that contracts all branches so as to bring them back to the root, the Lotus sutra.

=== Tiantai ===
The Chinese Tiantai school developed a doctrinal classification schema (panjiao) which organized the Buddhas teachings into five periods (五時) and Eight teachings:

==== Five periods ====
1. Flower Ornament period 華嚴時, The sudden teaching is delivered as the Avatamsaka sutra, containing the direct content of the Buddha's enlightenment experience. Few can understand it.
2. Deer Park period 鹿苑時 (represented by the Āgama sūtras 阿含經), represent a gradual and simpler teaching.
3. the Vaipulya period 方等時 (represented by the Vimalakīrti Sūtra 淨名經 and so forth); this and the next period represent gradually deeper teachings.
4. the Prajñā period 般若時 (represented by the Prajñāpāramitā sūtras 般若經).
5. Lotus-Nirvāṇa period 法華涅槃時, Lotus sutra and Mahāparinirvāṇa-sūtra, a teaching that is neither sudden nor gradual.

==== Eight teachings ====
The Fourfold Teachings:

1. Tripitaka Teaching (三藏教): the Sutra, Vinaya and Abhidharma
2. Shared Teaching (通教): the teaching of emptiness, which is shared by Mahayana and Hinayana.
3. Distinctive Teaching (別教): the teachings of the Bodhisattva path.
4. Complete (Round) Teaching (圓教) - the complete and perfect teaching found in the Lotus Sutra , Nirvana Sutra and the Avatamsaka Sutra.

The Fourfold Method classifies four different ways that the Buddha uses to guide sentient beings of different capacities:

1. Gradual Teaching (漸教): Teaches the truth in stages
2. Sudden Teaching (頓教): Reveals the ultimate truth directly and immediately
3. Secret Teaching (祕密教): A teaching which communicates in a secret manner in which the Buddha's intent remains hidden to most and is understood only by certain members of the assembly.
4. Variable Teaching (不定教): A method with no fixed teaching; the interpretation is not fixed but depends on the hearer's capacities.

=== Huayen ===
Likewise, the Huayen school had a five period panjiao of dharma teachings as taught by patriarch Fazang:

1. The Hinayana teachings
2. The Elementary Mahayana teachings, which includes the teachings of the Yogacara, and Madhyamaka schools
3. The "Final Teaching" of Mahayana, based on the Buddha-nature teachings, especially those of the Awakening of Faith
4. The Sudden Teaching, "which 'revealed' (hsien) rather than verbalised the teaching"
5. The Complete, or Perfect Teachings of the Avatamsaka-sutra and the Huayan school.

=== Zongmi ===
The Chan and Huayan master Zongmi developed his own panjiao in his Inquiry into the Origin of Humanity. One influential and innovative change to Zongmi's panjiao is the fact that he included non-buddhist religions in it. This schema is as follows:

1. Vehicle of humans and gods (人天教), which includes Confucianism and Daoism
2. Hinayana (小乘教)
3. The Mahayana teaching of phenomenal appearances (大乘法相教)
4. The Mahayana refutation of phenomenal appearances (大乘破相教)
5. The direct revelation of the Nature (顯性教)

=== Japanese Buddhism ===
Kukai in Japan wrote Himitsumandara jūjūshinron (祕密曼荼羅十住心論, Treatise on The Ten Stages of the Development of Mind) and Enchin also developed a Tendai classification system.

== Tibetan Buddhist tenet systems ==
Tibetan Vajrayana schools sometimes refer to Buddhist tantra as a "fourth turning", adding it to the classic Indian "three turnings model". As explained by Lama Surya Das, some traditions consider Dzogchen as a fourth turning.

The most common style of doctrinal classification system in Tibetan Buddhism however is found in a genre called "tenets" (Tibetan: grub mtha'), from the Sanskrit term Siddhānta (established doctrine, accepted conclusion). This genre of scholastic study and texts evolved from Indian doctrinal works, such as the Mahavibhasa, Bhaviveka's Blaze of Reasoning and Shantaraksita's Tattvasamgraha. These works categorized and discussed various Buddhist and non-Buddhist doctrines in a hierarchical fashion, refuting opposing doctrinal systems and culminating with the exposition of the proper correct "established doctrine" ("Siddhānta").

Tibetan Buddhists developed the genre further and numerous tenet works were written by figures such as Rongzompa, Chekawa Yeshe Dorje, Sakya Pandita, Longchenpa, Jamyang Shéba, and Changkya Rölpé Dorjé. The most common outline of basic tenets discussed in these works are four main schools of Indian Buddhist philosophy, which comprise two Hinayana schools: Vaibhāṣika, and Sautrāntika, and two Mahayana schools: Cittamātra (Mind-only), and Madhyamaka (which is sub-divided into the Prasaṅgika and Svatantrika camps).

When discussing Vajrayana Buddhism, Tibetan Buddhism also contains doctrinal classification systems for the various classes of Tantra. Vajrayana is thus considered to be a distinct esoteric category, apart from "exoteric" Mahayana Buddhism, also labeled "sutric" Mahayana.

The Nyingma school's Dzogchen tradition contains a unique classification system with nine types of teachings (or vehicles).

== See also ==
- Yana (Buddhism)
- Dhammacakkapavattana Sutta
- Dharmacakra
- Saṃdhinirmocana Sūtra

== Bibliography ==
- Gregory, Peter N. (1981). "The p'an-chiao system of the Hua-yen school". T'oung Pao. LXVII (1–2): 10–41.
- Kanno, Hiroshi (2000). A Comparison of Zhiji`s and Jizang`s Views of the Lotus Sutra:, Annual Report of The International Research Institute for Advanced Buddhology at Soka University, vol III, 125–147
- Liu, Ming-Wood (1993). The Chinese Madhyamaka Practice of "p'an-chiao": The Case of Chi-Tsang, Bulletin of the School of Oriental and African Studies, University of London 56 (1), 96–118
- Mun, Chanju (2006). The History of Doctrinal Classification in Chinese Buddhism: A Study of the Panjiao Systems. Lanham, MD: University Press of America. ISBN 0761833528
