= Abhisamayalankara =

One of five Sanskrit-language Mahayana śastras

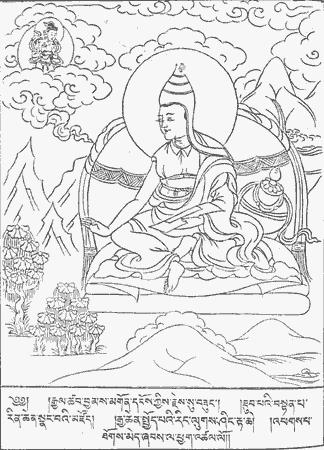
Tibetan illustration of Asaṅga receiving the AA from Maitreya in the Tuṣita heaven.

The Abhisamayālaṅkāra "Ornament of/for Realization[s]", abbreviated AA, is one of five Sanskrit-language Mahayana śastras which, according to Tibetan tradition, Maitreya revealed to Asaṅga in northwest India circa the 4th century AD. (Chinese tradition recognizes a different list of Maitreya texts which does not include the AA.) Those who doubt the claim of supernatural revelation disagree (or are unsure) whether the text was composed by Asaṅga himself, or by someone else, perhaps a human teacher of his.

The AA is never mentioned by Xuanzang, who spent several years at Nalanda in India during the early 7th century, and became a savant in the Maitreya-Asaṅga tradition. One possible explanation is that the text is late and attributed to Maitreya-Asaṅga for purposes of legitimacy. The question then hinges on the dating of the earliest extant AA commentaries, those of Arya Vimuktisena (usually given as 6th century, following possibly unreliable information from Taranatha) and Haribhadra (late 8th century).

The AA contains eight chapters and 273 verses. Its pithy contents summarize—in the form of eight categories and seventy topics—the Prajñāpāramitā sūtras which the Madhyamaka philosophical school regards as presenting the ultimate truth. Gareth Sparham and John Makransky believe the text to be commenting on the version in 25,000 lines, although it does not explicitly say so. Haribhadra, whose commentary is based on the 8,000-line PP Sūtra, held that the AA is commenting on all PP versions at once (i.e. the 100,000-line, 25,000-line, and 8,000-line versions), and this interpretation has generally prevailed within the commentarial tradition.

Several scholars liken the AA to a "table of contents" for the PP. Edward Conze admits that the correspondence between these numbered topics, and the contents of the PP is "not always easy to see..."; and that the fit is accomplished "not without some violence" to the text. The AA is widely held to reflect the hidden meaning (sbas don) of the PP, with the implication being that its details are not found there explicitly. (Sparham traces this tradition to Haribhadra's student Dharmamitra.) One noteworthy effect is to recast PP texts as path literature. Philosophical differences may also be identified. Conze and Makransky see the AA as an attempt to reinterpret the PP, associated with Mādhyamaka tenets, in the direction of Yogacara.

The AA is studied by all lineages of Tibetan Buddhism, and is one of five principal works studied in the geshe curriculum of the major Gelug monasteries. Alexander Berzin has suggested that the text's prominence in the Tibetan tradition, but not elsewhere, may be due to the existence of the aforementioned commentary by Haribhadra, who was the disciple of Śāntarakṣita, an influential early Indian missionary to Tibet. Je Tsongkhapa's writings name the AA as the root text of the lamrim tradition founded by Atiśa.

Georges Dreyfus reports that "Gelug monastic universities... take the Ornament as the central text for the study of the path; they treat it as a kind of Buddhist encyclopedia, read in the light of commentaries by Je Dzong-ka-ba, Gyel-tsap Je, and the authors of manuals [monastic textbooks]. Sometimes these commentaries spin out elaborate digressions from a single word of the Ornament." Dreyfus adds that non-Gelug schools give less emphasis to the AA, but study a somewhat larger number of works (including the other texts of the Maitreya-Asanga corpus) in correspondingly less detail.

== Title of the work ==
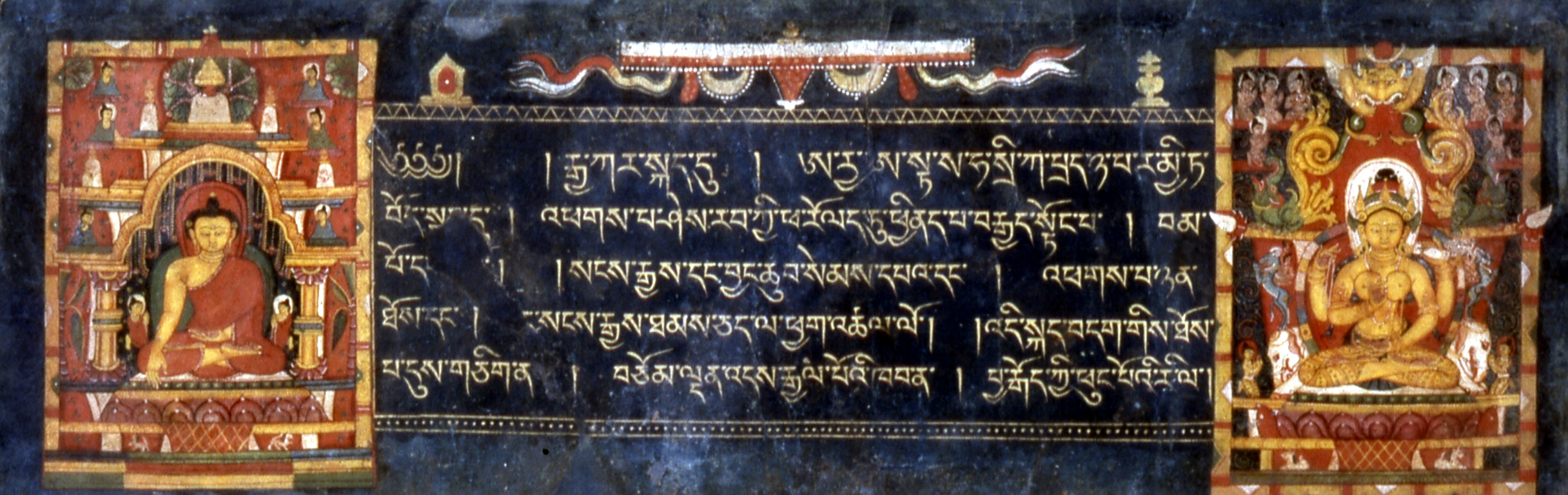
13th century Tibetan PP manuscript with images of Shakyamuni Buddha and the goddess Prajñāpāramita. Photo: Walters Art Museum (2001)

The text's full title is:

- Sanskrit: Abhisamayālaṅkāranāmaprajñāpāramitopadeśaśāstra
- Tibetan: Shes rap kyi pha rol tu phyin pa'i man ngag gi bstan bcos mngon par rtogs pa'i rgyan ces bya ba

Which means:

- abhisamaya (mngon par rtogs pa) - "Realization(s)"
- alaṅkāra (rgyan) -- "Ornament" (Berzin prefers "Filigree")
- nāma (zhes bya ba) -- "called"
- prajñāpāramitā (shes rap kyi pha rol tu phyin ba) - "Perfection of Wisdom"
- upadeśa (man ngag) -- "Instructions" (literally, "an up-close look")
- śāstra (bstan bcos)-- "Treatise"

Thus, a "Treatise [of] Instructions [on the] Perfection of Wisdom, called [the] Ornament [of / for] Realization[s]."

Sparham explains:

"The word abhisamaya is made up of the prefix abhi ("toward, over"), the prefix sam ("together with"), and the root i, a verb of motion with the secondary meaning "to understand." Generally speaking, abhisamaya means a coming together, a "re-union," particularly of a knower with something to be known, hence a "clear realization." In a title abhisamaya may just mean "chapter," hence the title Abhisamayālaṅkāra means Ornament for the Clear Realizations or Ornament for the Chapters.

Conze adds some details about the term's origins:

In the Pali scriptures the term is used to designate the stage when we comprehend the four holy truths. In the Abhidharmakośa (VI 122) it is interpreted as the correct (sam = samyak) knowledge (aya) which is turned toward (abhi) Nirvāṅa. In the Prajñāpāramitā Sūtra itself it is invariably coupled with prāpti, "attainment," and in one place...it is a synonymn for sāksātkriya (realization).

As to whether we are speaking of one realization, or of eight, Sparham offers the following explanation by rGyal tshab rJe, a 14th-15th century Tibetan commentator:

An admirer views a naturally beautiful woman adorned with golden ornaments reflected in a mirror. The Perfection of Wisdom Sūtras are the naturally beautiful woman. The systematization of the contents of the Sūtras into eight subjects and seventy topics are the golden ornaments, and the Ornament the mirror through which they view her.

Elaborating on the metaphor, Geshe Jampa Gyatso distinguishes between a "natural ornament" (the beautiful woman, the Perfection of Wisdom), "beautifying ornament" (her jewelry, the eight categories and seventy topics), "clarifying ornament" (the mirror, the AA), and "joyful ornament" (the joy of the beholder or AA devotee).

== Philosophical perspective ==
The PP Sūtras form the basis for the Mādhyamika ("Middle Way") school of Indian Buddhist philosophy, which Tibetan consensus acknowledges as the "highest" (truest, best) tenet system. Other writings by Maitreya and Asaṅga, however, form the basis for the rival Yogācāra ("Yoga Adepts") or Cittamātra ("Mind Only" or "Consciousness Only") school. It is therefore perhaps understandable that the AA, as Sparham writes, "straddles the ground between Indian Middle Way and Mind Only..." Conze concurs, ascribing to the AA "an intermediate position between Mādhyamikas and Yogācārins..."

Conze discovers in the AA "some affinities with other Yogācārin works" and suggests a number of precise correspondences. At the same time, he notes, "Two of the specific doctrines of the Yogācārins, i.e. the 'storeconsciousness' and the three kinds of own-being (svabhāva) are quite ignored." Eugène Obermiller on the other hand writes that "The main philosophical view expressed in the Abhisamayalaṅkāra is that of strictest Monism and of the Non-substantiality and Relativity (śūnyatā) of all separate elements of existence, i.e. the standpoint of the Mādhyamikas." Obermiller sees the AA as the product of interaction between Mahāyāna Buddhism and the Hindu Vedānta philosophy.

Gelugpa writers, following Bu ston, affirm Maitreya's text to represent the Prāsaṅgika viewpoint, but consider Haribhadra and later commentators to have taught something called "Yogācāra Svātantrika Madhyamaka." The category is often criticized as artificial, even by the standards of Tibetan doxography. Nyingma and Sakya writers agree that the AA contains Madhyamaka teachings, without necessarily endorsing the subdivisions proposed by Gelugpas.

In an aside, Ian Charles Harris finds it "curious" that

"...Maitreya is generally considered to be the mythical instructor of Asaṅga, and therefore for those who see Māhāyana Buddhism in terms of schools [as Harris does not], to be the founder of the Yogācāra-Vijñānanavāda. One wonders why someone seeking to establish a rival school to Nāgārjuna should wish to write a treatise on the Prajñāpāramitā if, as many authors believe, it is amenable only to an interpretation from the standpoint of the Prāsaṅgika-Madhyamaka."

Harris goes on to note the "strange fact" that Tsongkhapa would be a self-avowed Prasangika, despite his system's assignment of "all the great Madhyamaka authorities on the Prajñāpāramitā" to Yogācāra Svātantrika Madhyamaka.

According to Makransky, the AA was designed to impose a Yogācāra framework and vocabulary onto the PP. AA commentator Arya Vimuktisena preserves this Yogācāra reading; however, Makransky sees Haribhadra's reading as an attempt to "Mādhyamika-ize" the AA. Later Tibetan commentators broadly follow Haribhadra.

== The Eight Categories and Seventy Topics ==
The AA is divided into eight categories, which correspond to the eight chapters of the work, and (with one technical exception in chapter eight) to the eight "realizations" said to be necessary for full enlightenment. (Conze remarks that these eight are "not attested elsewhere.")

This division into eight appears thus at the beginning of the AA itself:

[The Buddhas] proclaim the Perfection of Wisdom [Sūtra] by way of eight subjects. These eight are the knowledge of all aspects, knowledge of paths, and all knowledge. Then there is the awakening to all aspects, when culmination is attained, serial, awakening in an instant, and the Truth Body. [AA verses 1.4 and 1.5, Sparham translation]

These eight categories naturally fall into three groups, as shown below. The seventy topics (here enumerated but not shown) are their subdivisions. Obermiller traces this list to a manual attributed to 'Jam dbyangs Bzhad pa, who also created the various definitions and category-boundaries familiar to Tibetan debaters. The text may be subdivided further still, into 1,200 items.

Unless otherwise indicated, the English terms below follow Sparham's translation (which revises Conze's).

=== The Three Knowledges ===
The first three categories represent the objects or goals of practice, whose attainment leads to peace for the four classes of Buddhist practitioner. Obermiller calls them "the 3 Kinds of Omniscience," while Toh prefers "the Three Exalted Knowers" and Berzin, "the Three Sets of Realized Awareness."

1. Knowledge of all aspects

(Sarvākārajñatā, rnam pa tham cad mkhyen pa).............................10 topics
(Wisdom attained by Buddhas; inclusive of categories two and three below)

2. Knowledge of paths

(Mārgākārajñatā, lam shes pa)....................................................11 topics
(Wisdom attained by bodhisattvas; inclusive of category three below)

3. All-knowledge

(Sarvajñatā, gzhi shes pa)...........................................................9 topics
(Wisdom attained by sravakas and pratyekabuddhas, i.e., Hinayana practitioners)

Berzin explains these categories as

"...groupings of realizations gained by the three sets of aryas ('phags-pa, highly realized beings), those who have gained nonconceptual cognition of the sixteen aspects of the four noble truths. The three are organized into basis, pathway, and resultant stages and thus, in a complex manner, are cumulative. They are studied, however, in reverse order to their attainment, in order to inspire interest in developing them."

Sravakas and Pratyekabuddhas, in order to discern the truths of anitya (impermanence), anatman (selflessness), and dukha (suffering), must acquire knowledge of the fundamental constituents of reality (vastu)--namely the skandhas, ayatanas, and dhatus which are the subjects of Abhidharma. This is the "all-knowledge" of chapter three. A bodhisattva, in order to benefit all sentient beings, must additionally cognize the various possible paths by which others may progress, so that he may, for example, teach in different ways in accordance with their various situations and capacities. This is the "knowledge of paths" of chapter two. According to the Mahayana understanding, only a fully enlightened Buddha has eliminated obstacles to omniscience (jneyavaranaheya) as well as obstacles to liberation (kleshavaranaheya). "Knowledge of all aspects" in the first chapter refers to this ultimate state. The AA begins with this as the most impressive of the three, and the ultimate goal of the Mahayana practitioner.

=== The Four Practices ===
Categories four through seven (in this order) represent progressive stages of spiritual practice en route to enlightenment. Conze calls them four "understandings"; Obermiller, "practical methods"; Toh, "applications"; and Berzin (who notes the close connection to "yoga," ngal sbyor), "applied realizations."

4. Full awakening to all aspects

(Sarvākārābhisambodha, rnam rzdogs sbyor ba)..........................11 topics

5. Culmination clear realization

(Murdhābhisamaya, rtse mor phyin pa'i sbyor ba)..........................8 topics

6. Serial clear realization

(Anupurvābhisamaya, mthar gyis pa'i sbyor ba)............................13 topics

7. Clear realization in a single instant

(Ekaksanābhisamaya, skad cig ma'i sbyor ba)..............................4 topics

Referring to the above, Dreyfus explains that

"...the Ornament presents the four practices or realizations [chapters 4-7], emphasizing particularly 'the practice of all the aspects' (rnam rzdogs sbyor ba), which is treated in the fourth chapter. In fact, that practice is the central topic of the text and may have been an actual practice in which all the aspects of the three wisdoms [chapters 1-3] are brought together... But--and this point is crucial--no teacher I have ever met seems to have practiced this meditation, or even to have been clear on how to do so... Clearly the work's central themes are not practiced in the Tibetan scholastic traditions."

Tibetan tradition lays special emphasis on chapter four, perhaps because it is the longest and most complex, and therefore best suited to commentary and debate. This fourth chapter enumerates, and extensively describes, (in Obermiller's words) "173 forms of the Bodhisattva's yoga as realizing respectively the 173 aspects (of the 3 forms of Omniscience)."

=== The Resultant Truth Body ===
The last Category concerns the result of spiritual practice:

8. The Resultant Truth Body

(Dharmakāyābhisambodha, chos sku)........................................4 topics

--------------
70 topics

By this is meant the Dharmakāya, one of several glorified spiritual bodies (Makransky prefers "embodiments") which a Buddha is said to possess. A commentarial tradition beginning with Arya Vimuktisena interprets the AA as teaching the existence of three such bodies (the trikaya doctrine); a rival tradition follows Haribhadra in identifying four such bodies, with the fourth, disputed kāya being the Svabhāvikakāya (Tib. ngo bo nyid kyi sku) or "Nature / Essence Body". (Other writers interpret this last term as a synonym for Dharmakaya, or else as symbolizing the unity of the three.) Makransky, whose Buddhism Embodied focuses on this eighth chapter of the AA, writes that

"Haribhadra had read AA 8 as a systematic treatise whose purpose was to present a logically coherent model of Buddhahood. His perspective owed much to Buddhist logic and Abhidharma traditions that had sought such systematic coherence. Ratnākarāśānti, basing himself instead on the perspective on nondual yogic traditions, specifically understood the terms svābhāvikakāya and dharmakāya in AA 8 (and throughout Mahāyana literature) to refer to a Buddha's own perspective on the nature of his attainment, not to a human perspective on it. [...] Tsong kha pa, influenced by the logico-epistemological approach expressed in Haribhadra's work, supported his interpretation of AA 8. Go ram pa, drawing from a perspective framed by nondual yogic praxis, supported Ratnākorāśānti's call to return to Arya Vimuktisena's previous interpretation. Tsong kha pa and Go ram pa's interpretations are closely related to their differing perspectives on a Buddha's awareness, which was an explicit topic of discussion in Candrakirti's Mādhyamikāvatāra, upon which they both commented."

For Makransky, the controversy reflects a fundamental tension between immanent and transcendent aspects of Buddhism, which is also reflected in debate over the Three Turnings of the Wheel of Dharma, or gradual vs. sudden enlightenment (as at Samye). In his view, all these controversies stem from a fundamental difficulty in reconciling the transcendent nature of Buddhahood with the immanent nature of bodhicitta.

== Ancillary Topics ==
Obermiller, describing the curriculum of Drepung's (’Bras spungs) Go mang college, reports that the monks studied the AA in a four-year sequence (after certain preliminary subjects); and that each class also studied a prescribed "secondary subject" (zur-bkol) for that year:

First class: Introduction to the AA as well as the special topic, the "Twenty Sangha."

Second class: Finished through the seventh topic of the first AA chapter; the supplementary topic was dependent origination (pratītyasamutpāda)

Third class: Finished the first AA chapter and continued; also studied the Yogacara theory of the storehouse consciousness (ālāyavijñāna), and the difference between definitive and interpretable scripture as taught by Mādhyamaka and Yogācāra.

Fourth class: Focused on the fourth chapter of the AA ("which is regarded as the most difficult"), supplemented with "the teaching about the four degrees of trance in the sphere of Etherial Bodies...and the four degrees of mystic absorption in the Immaterial Sphere." The fourth-year students would conclude with a celebratory feast.

Obermiller adds that "All these studies are conducted in the form of lectures which are accompanied by controversies between the different groups of students according to the method of 'sequence and reason' (thal-phyir)."

=== Twenty Sangha ===
The subject of "Twenty Sangha" (vimsatiprabhedasamgha, dge 'dun nyi shu) aims at schematizing the various spiritual levels through which one might pass on the way to enlightenment. Here "Sangha" refers not so much to actual monks and nuns (the term's most common meaning), but to an idealized, gradated schema of all the types of accomplished Buddhist. The AA explains that it is the latter sense of "Sangha" which constitutes the object of Buddhist Refuge, and in an especially cryptic verse, offers the following subdivision into twenty types:

There are Twenty [categories]: those with dull and sharp faculties, those who have attained faith and vision, those who are born from family to family, those born with one interval, those who are born in the intermediate state, those who are born, with effort and effortlessly, those who go to Akanistha, three who leap, those who go to the upper limit of the world, those who destroy attachment to the form [realm], those who pacify visual phenomena, the bodily witness, and the rhinoceros. [AA verses 1.23-24, James Apple translation]

What does this mean? "Akanistha" is the name of the highest Buddha-field in the Form Realm, inhabited by pious gods and tenth-ground bodhisattvas. The solitary nature of the rhinoceros made that animal a traditional symbol for pratyekabuddhas ("solitary Buddhas"). Beyond that, the list is quite difficult to decipher.

The basic project seems to have been inspired by an earlier typology of four (Stream-Enterer, Once-Returner, Non-Returner, Arhat), which may be expanded to eight by distinguishing between approachers to (zhugs pa), or abiders at ('bras gnas), each level. Unfortunately the list of twenty does not correspond very well with this earlier one. Furthermore, Tibetan exegetical tradition estimates the actual number of types of Sangha (including combinations and subdivisions) to approach the tens of thousands. Such difficulties seem to account for much of the subject's popularity in debate.(See Apple's monograph on the subject.)

=== Definitive and Interpretable Scriptures ===
Tibetan tradition accepts the common Mahayana view that Sakyamuni Buddha (the historical Buddha) taught various kinds of teachings that do not seem to agree—hence the various discrepancies between nikaya Buddhism and the Mahayana scriptures—and following the Sandhinirmocana Sutra, hold that the Buddha taught three grand cycles called "Turnings of the Wheel of Dharma." According to the sutra, the first of these consists of Hinayana teachings; the second, of Mahdyamaka teachings; and the third, of Yogacara teachings. The sutra seems to assume the third cycle to consist of the "highest" teachings. However, Tibetan tradition generally sides with Madhyamaka, and therefore must read the sutra in this light.

The issue becomes more pressing since Tibetan Buddhist doctrine in fact combines elements from all three cycles, and is therefore faced with the task of defending its authorities while simultaneously minimizing contradictions between them.

== Commentarial literature ==
=== In India ===
The oldest extant commentary is that of Ārya Vimuktisena (Grol sde), called Illuminating the Twenty Thousand: A Commentary on the Ornament (Pañcavimsatisāhasrikāprajñāparamitopadesasāstrabhisamāyalaṅkāravrtti, nyi khri snang ba). Written in a different style from its successors, it makes frequent reference to Vasubandhu's Abhidharmakośaśāstra.

Even more influential have been the commentaries of Haribadra (Seng ge Bzang Po), especially his Blossomed Meaning (Sphuṭārthā, 'grel pa don gsal) and Light for the Ornament. (Abhisamāyalaṅkāralokāprajñāpāramitāvyākhyā, rgyan snang). Haribhadra also edited an abridgment of this work, called the "Short Commentary" (Sphuṭārtha, 'grel pa don gsal/'grel chung).

Altogether, 21 ancient Indian AA commentaries are said to have been translated into Tibetan, although it is possible to doubt the existence of some of the titles listed. For example, an ambiguous reference at the beginning of Haribhadra's prefatory homage is sometimes interpreted to mean that Asanga wrote an AA commentary. If so, the work is no longer extant. Haribhadra also mentions an AA commentary by Vasubandhu entitled Padhati ("The Well-Trodden Path"), and one by Bhadanta Vimuktisena ("the Intelligent" Vimuktisena—not to be confused with Ārya, "the Noble" Vimuktisena) called Excellent Explanation of the Twenty Thousand (Abhisamayālaṅkāra-vārttika, tshig le'ur byas pa'i rnam par 'drel pa). However, the commentaries by Ārya Vimuktisena and Haribhadra are most fundamental to the subsequent commentarial tradition. Sparham writes that

...practically speaking, the Light [Haribhadra's commentary] is the more readable explanation. It has fewer words to explain [since it is based on the 8,000-line PP rather than the 25,000-line version]. Ārya may well be the more profound thinker, but Hari's is the better book. This perhaps explains why Hari, not Ārya, became the most influential Indian figure in the study of the Perfection of Wisdom in Tibet, even though Ārya is more admired. It also perhaps explains why Hari's own abridgement of his Light is the basis of nearly every Tibetan Perfection of Wisdom commentary.

Makransky, on the other hand, feels that Arya Vimuktasena's commentary better captures the AA's Yogācāra assumptions.

=== In Tibet ===
The AA was extremely influential in Tibet, resulting in the production of numerous commentaries. The first were those of "Ngok Lotsawa" or "Ngok the Translator" (Rngog Lo tsa ba Bal ldan Shes rab, 1059–1109): Mngon rtogs rgyan gyi don bsdus pa (a summary), Shes rab kyi pha rol tu phyin pa'i man ngag mngon par rtogs pa'i rgyan gi tik chung (a "small" commentary), and an 8000-line Prajnaparamita summary called Yum brgyad stong pa'i 'grel pa'i don bsdus (possibly a sub-commentary to Haribhadra's Short Commentary).

Well known Nyingma commentaries on the AA include the sher phyin mngon rtogs rgyan gyi spyi don by Dza Patrul Rinpoche, Orgyen Jikmé Chökyi Wangpo which forms the whole of the sixth volume of his Collected Works; and The Words of the Invincible Maitreya, (ma pham zhal lung) by Pöpa Tulku Dongak Tenpé Nyima.

Sakya commentators on the AA include 'Go rams pa bsod nams seng ge (four commentaries), Sakya Chokden, Shes ba Kun rig (seven commentaries and treatises), and G.Yag ston (Sangs gyas dpal, g.yag phrug pa, 1350–1414). The latter's work is King of Wish-Fulfilling Jewels (Mngon rtogs rgyan 'grel pa rin chen bsam 'phel dbang rgyal), in eight volumes.

Kagyu commentaries on the AA include Padma Karpo's "The Words of Jetsun Maitreya"; the "Short and Clear" commentary mngon rtogs rgyan gyi ‘grel pa nyung ngu rnam gsal by Shamar Konchok Yenlag; "Introducing the Lamp of the Three Worlds: A commentary on the Ornament of Realization" (mngon rtogs rgyan rtsa ‘grel gyi sbyor tika ‘jig rten gsum sgron la ‘jugs pa) by Karma Thinleypa

Tsongkhapa's teacher Don grub Rin chen encouraged him to study the five texts of Maitreya, especially the AA. One of Tsongkhapa's major works, Golden Garland (gSer-phreng), is an AA commentary. His disciple Gyaltsab (rGyal tshab Dar ma Rin chen) also wrote an AA subcommentary, called Ornament of the Essence (mngon rtongs rgyan gyi grel pa dor gsal rnam bshad snying po'i rgyan).

=== In East Asia ===
The AA seems not to have been translated into Chinese until the 1930s. At this time the Chinese monk Fazun (法尊), an associate of Taixu (太虛), produced a translation entitled 現觀莊嚴論, for use by the Sino-Tibetan Buddhist Institute (漢藏教理院) in Sichuan. The institute's leaders sought to harmonize the Buddhisms of China and Tibet, and improve relations between the Khampas and Han Chinese immigrants to Eastern Tibet. Fazun had studied in the geshe program of the Drepung ('Bras spungs) college (grwa tshang) of Loseling (Blo gsal gling), near Lhasa, and possibly even obtained the degree. The institute failed to survive the Chinese Civil War.

=== In the West ===
The AA seems not to have attracted the attention of Western scholars until the 1930s, when Eugène Obermiller and Theodore Stcherbatsky produced an edition of the Sanskrit / Tibetan text. Obermiller, a specialist in Yogacara and Tathagatagarbha literature, also wrote a lengthy article on the AA ("The Doctrine of PP...") and was in the process of composing Analysis of the AA when he died. While Obermiller approached the AA from the perspective of "Monism," which he associated with Vedanta, his studies in the Buryat Mongolian monastery of Dgah ldan dar rgyas gling (Chilutai) exposed him to a more traditional hermeneutic framework. Along with a translation of the AA (or the three-fifths of it which he finished), he also provided a summary of Haribhadra's commentary for each section.

Edward Conze, who was active from the 1950s to the 1970s, devoted his career to PP translations and commentaries, his AA translation being an early example. An especially significant work was his translation of the PP Sutra in 25,000-lines, which he organized according to the AA topics. This required a certain amount of creative editing on his part—for example, his translation does not strictly follow the 25,000-line AA, but incorporates text from other PP Sutras. Like Obermiller, Conze's writings betray a certain German idealistic influence, hence his references to "Union with the Absolute."

During the 2000s, several Western scholars with experience as Buddhist monks living among the Tibetan exile community in Dharamsala, who had participated in traditional geshe studies, published articles and books related to the AA. Their ranks included Gareth Sparham (who translated the AA anew, along with the commentaries of Arya Vimuktisena, Haribhadra, and Tsongkhapa) and Geshe Georges Dreyfus (whose writings describe the contemporary social context of AA study). In addition, studies and translations by Karl Brunnhölzl and the Padmakara Translation Group have focused on non-Gelug readings of this text, which the earlier literature had neglected. The AA has also received attention from several Western dharma centers (notably those associated with the Foundation for the Preservation of the Mahayana Tradition, whose FPMT Masters Program devotes several years to its study), with the result that the AA has now been transmitted to the West not only as a text, but as a living spiritual tradition.

== Bibliography ==
Amano, Hirofusa. "A Fragment from the Abhisamayālaṅkāra-namaprajñaparamitopadesa-sastravṛtti, alias 'Sphuṭartha' of Haribhadra. Annual Report of the Tôhoku Research Institute of Buddhist Culture, vol. 3 (1961), pp. 1-25 (in Japanese).

Amano, Hirofusa. A Study on the Abhisamaya-Alaṅkara-Karika-Sastra-Vṛtti. Tokyo, 1975.

Amano, Hirofusa. "On the Composite Purpose of the Abhisamayālaṅkāra-karika-sastra: Haribhadra's Way of Explaining. Journal of Indian and Buddhist Studies, vol. 17, no. 2 (1969), pp. 59-69 (in Japanese).

Amano, Hirofusa. Sanskrit Manuscript of the Abhisamayalaṅkara-vṛtti (in six parts). Bulletin of the Hijiyama Women's Junior College, vol. 7 (1983), pp. 1-15; Bulletin of the Faculty of Education of Shimane University, vol. 19 (1985), pp. 124-138; vol. 20 (1986), pp. 67-86; vol. 21 (1987), pp. 39-51; vol. 22 (1988), pp. 10-25; vol. 23 (1989), pp. 1-7.

Apple, James B. Stairway to Nirvana: A Study of the Twenty-Samghas base on the works of Tsong Kha Pa. SUNY Press, 2008.

Apple, James B. "Twenty Varieties of the Samgha: A Typology of Noble Beings (Arya) in Indo-Tibetan Scholasticism" (in two parts, Parts I and Part II). Journal of Indian Philosophy 31 (2003), 503–592; and 32 (2004), 211–279. These are chapters of Apple's doctoral dissertation for the University of Wisconsin (Madison), which later evolved into the monograph Stairway to Nirvana (see above).

Brunnhölzl, Karl (translator). Gone Beyond: The Prajnaparamita Sutras, The Ornament of Clear Realization, and Its Commentaries in the Tibetan Kagyu Tradition (in two volumes). Ithaca: Snow Lion, 2011 and 2012.

Conze, Edward. The Prajñāpāramitā Literature. Delhi: Munshiram Manoharlal Publishers, 2000 (1978). See pp. 101–120.

Conze, Edward (translator and editor). The Large Sutra on Perfect Wisdom: With the Divisions of the Abhisamayālankāra. Univ. of California Press: 1985.

Conze, Edward (translator). Abhisamayālankāra: Introduction and Translation from Original Text, With Sanskrit-Tibetan Index. Serie Orienta: Rome, [n.d.; actually 1954].

Dreyfus, Georges. The Sound of Two Hands Clapping: The Education of a Tibetan Buddhist Monk. University of California Press: 2003. Ch. 8 (pp. 174–182 of this edition) discusses the role of the Abhisamayalankara in the Tibetan monastic curriculum.

Dreyfus, Georges. "Tibetan scholastic education and the role of soteriology." In Paul Williams (ed.), Buddhism: Critical Concepts in Religious Studies, vol. VI, pp. 32–57. Originally published in the Journal of the International Association of Buddhist Studies vol. 20, no. 1 (1997), pp. 31–62. This is an early (and extended) version of material later incorporated into The Sound of Two Hands Clapping. Dreyfus's discussion of the Abisamayalankara begins on pp. 46, and continues to the end of the article.

Jackson, David P. (ed.), Rong-ston on the Prajñāpāramitā Philosophy of the Abhisamayālaṃkāra: His Sub-commentary on Haribhadra's "Sphuṭārthā: A Facsimile Reproduction of the Earliest Known Blockprint Edition, from an Exemplar Preserved in the Tibet House, New Delhi. Nagata Bunshodo: Kyoto, 1988.

Makransky, John J. Buddhism Embodied: Sources of Controversy in India and Tibet. SUNY Press, 1997. Focuses on the eighth chapter of the AA. Instead of three or four "bodies" (kāya), Makransky prefers to speak of "embodiments."

Obermiller, E[ugène]. Analysis of the Abhisamayalamkara. Asian Humanities Press: 2003. Original publication London: Luzac & Co., 1936.

Obermiller, E. The Doctrine of Prajñā-Pāramitā as Exposed in the Abhisamayalamkara of Maitreya. Canon Publications: 1984. Originally published in Acta Orientalia 11 (1932–33), pp. 1–133, 334-354.

Obermiller, E. & T[heodore] I. Shcherbatskoi. Abhisamahalankara-Prajnaparamita-Upadesa-Sastra: The Work of Bodhisattva Maitreya. Sri Satguru Publications, 1992.

Sparham, Gareth (translator). Abhisamayalamkara with Vrtti and Aloka (in four volumes). Jain Publishing Company, 2006 (vol. 1) and 2008 (vol. 2).

Sparham, Gareth (editor). Golden Garland of Eloquence, vols. 1 and 2. Jain Publishing Company. 2008. Translation of an AA commentary by Tsongkhapa.

Toh Sze Gee (translator). The Explanation Ornament of the Essence along with (i) the Root Text of the Treatise of Quintessential Instructions of the Perfection of Wisdom: Ornament for Clear Realization and (ii) the Commentary Clear Meaning, by Gyaltsab Darma Rinchen. FPMT Masters Program Translation, 2009. Available from FPMT Education Services.

== Sources ==
- Conze, Edward (1954). Abhisamayālankāra: Introduction and Translation from Original Text, With Sanskrit-Tibetan Index (PDF). Rome: Istituto italiano per il Medio ed Estremo Oriente. Archived from the original (PDF) on 2006-09-24.
- Maitreyanātha; Sparham, Gareth (trans) (2006). Abhisamayalamkara with Vrtti and Aloka - Vol. 1. Jain Publishing. ISBN 0-89581-991-0. — (First Abhisamaya - with the Vrtti of Arya Vimuktisena and the Aloka of Haribhadra)
- Maitreyanātha; Sparham, Gareth (trans) (2008). Abhisamayalamkara with Vrtti and Aloka - Vol. 2. Jain Publishing. ISBN 978-0-89581-992-5. — (Second and Third Abhisamayas- with the Vrtti of Arya Vimuktisena and the Aloka of Haribhadra)
- Maitreyanātha; Obermiller, E.; Stcherbatsky, Th. (1992). Abhisamayalankara-Prajnaparamita-Upadesa-Sastra : The Work of Bodhisattva Maitreya. Sri Satguru Publications (reprint). ISBN 81-7030-304-4.
- Makransky, John J. (1997). Buddhahood Embodied: Sources of Controversy in India and Tibet. SUNY. ISBN 0-7914-3431-1. — a study of interpretations of the Abhisamayalankara.
- Obermiller, Eugene (2001). Analysis of the Abhisamayalamkara. Asian Humanities Press. ISBN 0-89581-940-6. - reprint edition of 1936 publication
- Thrangu Rinpoche (1999). The Ornament of Clear Realization: A Commentary on the Prajnaparamita of the Maitreya Buddha. Namo Buddha Seminar. ASIN B000OZ6VC2.
- Tsong kha pa; Sparham, Gareth (trans) (2008). Golden Garland of Eloquence - Vol. 1. Jain Publishing. ISBN 978-0-89581-865-2. — (First Abhisamaya) — the first part of Tsongkhapa's legs-bshad gser-phreng commentary on the AA.
- Tsong kha pa; Sparham, Gareth (trans) (2008). Golden Garland of Eloquence - Vol. 2. Jain Publishing. ISBN 978-0-89581-865-2. — (Second and Third Abhisamaya)
