= Maitreya-nātha =

4th-century Buddhist philosopher

Maitreya-nātha (c. 270–350 CE) is a name whose use was pioneered by Buddhist scholars Erich Frauwallner, Giuseppe Tucci, and Hakuju Ui to distinguish one of the three founders of the Yogācāra school of Buddhist philosophy, along with Asanga and Vasubandhu. Some scholars believe this Maitreya to be a historical person in India who authored various Yogācāra texts known as the Maitreya corpus. The traditions themselves have held that it is referring to the bodhisattva Maitreya, the future buddha.

== Academic views ==
Scholars are divided in opinion whether the name refers to a historical Buddhist author, possibly even a teacher of Asaṅga, or to the bodhisattva Maitreya (the future Buddha). Frauwallner, Tucci and Ui proposed that "Maitreya" referred to a historical figure, while Eric Obermiller and Fyodor Shcherbatskoy doubted this theory.

=== Three Yogācāra texts as possibly the works of a single author ===
Modern scholars argue that many of the various texts traditionally attributed to Maitreya (and supposedly revealed to Asanga) like the Abhisamayalankara and the Ratnagotravibhaga are actually later post-Asanga texts. However, some scholars like Gareth Sparham use the name Maitreya to refer to the author of "three Maitreya texts", all which seem to be by the same author. This Maitreya Corpus comprises the following texts:

- the Mahāyānasūtrālamkārakarika (Verses on the Ornament of the Mahāyāna Sūtras) and its commentary,
- the Dharmadharmatāvibhāga (Distinguishing Dharmata from the dharmas)
- the Madhyāntavibhāga (Distinguishing the Middle from the Extremes)

Paul Williams writes that "it is quite possible that these other three [texts] do have a single author" and cites Frauwallner who also thought these three texts were similar.

Mario D'amato, who also agrees that these texts likely share a single author, dates these three "Maitreya" texts to a phase after the completion of the Bodhisattvabhumi but before the composition of Asanga's Mahāyānasaṃgraha (which quotes the Mahāyānasūtrālamkāra as an authoritative text).

== Traditional view ==
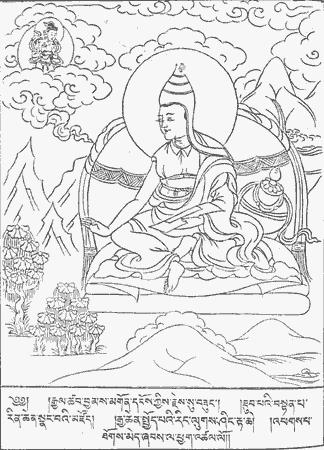
Tibetan depiction of Asanga receiving teachings from Maitreya in the Tushita heaven.

The Buddhist traditions themselves have always held that Asaṅga received the "Maitreya" texts from the bodhisattva Maitreya directly. Asaṅga is said to have spent many years in intense meditation, during which time tradition says that he often visited Tuṣita to receive teachings from the Maitreya. Heavens such as Tuṣita are said to be accessible through meditation. Xuanzang tells the account of these events:

In the great mango grove five or six li to the southwest of the city (Ayodhyā), there is an old monastery where Asaṅga Bodhisattva received instructions and guided the common people. At night he went up to the place of Maitreya Bodhisattva in Tuṣita Heaven to learn the Yogācārabhūmi-śāstra, the Mahāyāna-sūtra-alaṃkāra-śāstra, the Madhyānta-vibhāga-śāstra, etc.; in the daytime, he lectured on the marvelous principles to a great audience.

Confusion over the idea of "supernaturally" visiting heavens may be due to the unfamiliarity of scholars with the Indian concept of heavens as being accessible through samādhi. Other advanced meditators recorded similar experiences of visiting Tuṣita Heaven at night. One such example of this is Hanshan Deqing during the Ming dynasty. In his autobiography, Hanshan describes the palace of Maitreya in Tuṣita, and hearing a lecture given by Bodhisattva Maitreya to a large group of his disciples.

=== Attributed works ===
The number of works attributed to him vary in the traditions of Tibetan Buddhism and Chinese Buddhism. In the Tibetan tradition the "five Dharmas of Maitreya" are:

- the Yogācārabhūmi śāstra, the encyclopedic and definitive text of the Yogacara school
- the Mahāyānasūtrālamkārakārikā, which presents the Mahāyāna path from the Yogācāra perspective
- the Dharmadharmatāvibhāga, a short Yogācāra work discussing the distinction and correlation (vibhāga) between phenomena (dharma) and reality (dharmatā)
- the Madhyāntavibhāgakārikā, 112 verses that are a key work in Yogācāra philosophy
- the Abhisamayalankara, which summarizes the Prajnaparamita sūtras, which the Mādhyamaka school regards as presenting the ultimate truth
- the Ratnagotravibhāga, also known as the Uttāratantra śāstra, a compendium of the Buddha-nature literature

The Chinese tradition meanwhile maintains that the five revealed scriptures are: the Yogācārabhūmi, *Yogavibhāga [now lost], Mahāyānasūtrālamkārakā, Madhyāntavibhāga and the Vajracchedikākāvyākhyā.
