= Asanga =

4th-century Mahayana Buddhist scholar

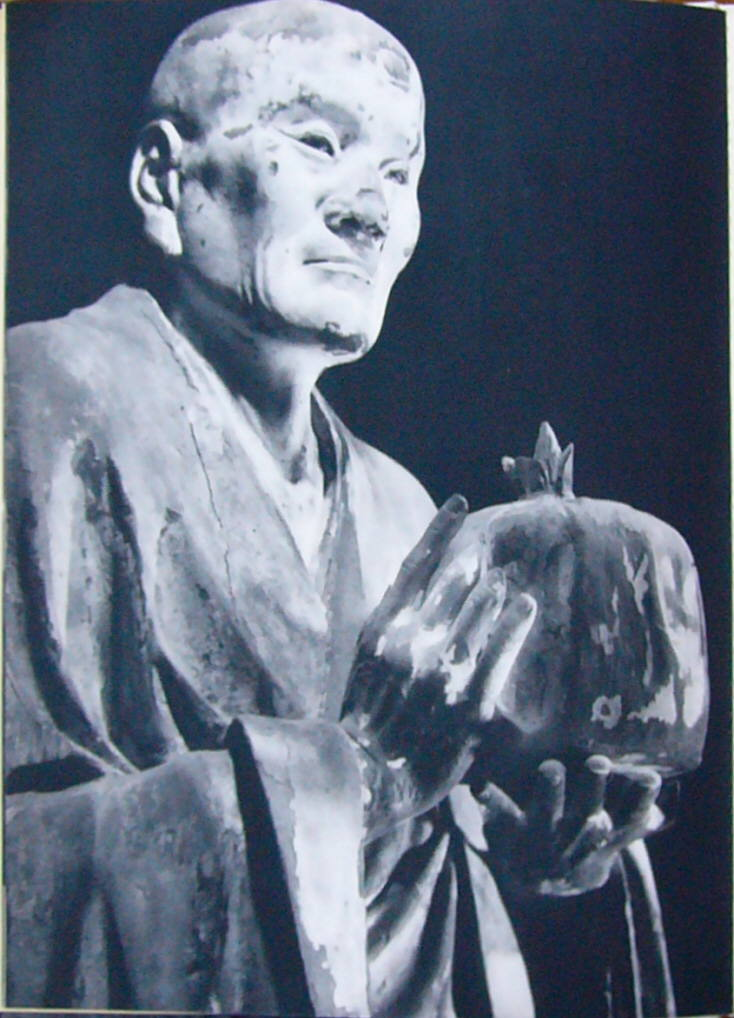
Japanese wood statue of Asaṅga from 1208 CE

Asaṅga (Sanskrit: असंग, Tibetan: ཐོགས་མེད།, Wylie: thogs med, traditional Chinese: 無著; ; pinyin: Wúzhuó; Romaji: Mujaku) (fl. 4th century C.E.) was one of the most important spiritual figures of Mahayana Buddhism and the founder of the Yogachara school. Traditionally, he and his half-brother Vasubandhu are regarded as the major classical Indian Sanskrit exponents of Mahayana Abhidharma, Vijñanavada (awareness only; also called Vijñaptivāda, the doctrine of ideas or percepts, and Vijñaptimātratā-vāda, the doctrine of 'mere representation) thought and Mahayana teachings on the bodhisattva path. He is also traditionally considered as one of the seventeen Nalanda masters who taught at the monastery which is located in modern-day Bihar.

== Biography ==
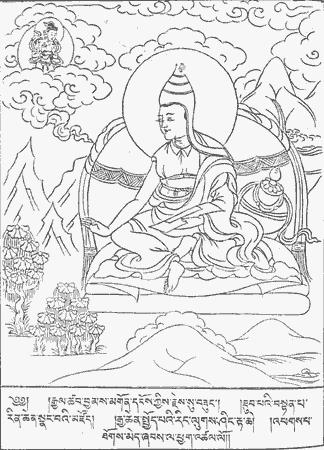
Tibetan depiction of Asaṅga and Maitreya

There are differing views as to Asaṅga's birthplace. Some sources record that he was born in Puruṣapura (present day Peshawar in Pakistan) in a Brahmin family, which at that time was part of the ancient kingdom of Gandhāra. However the writings of Buton Rinchen Drub state that Asanga and his brother, Vasubandhu, were born in Central India. Current scholarship places him in the fourth century CE. He was perhaps originally a member of the Mahīśāsaka school or the Mūlasarvāstivāda school but later converted to Mahāyāna. According to some scholars, Asaṅga's frameworks for Abhidharma writings retained many underlying Mahīśāsaka traits, but other scholars argue that there is insufficient data to determine which school he originally belonged to.

In the record of his journeys through the kingdoms of India, Xuanzang wrote that Asaṅga was initially a Mahīśāsaka monk, but soon turned toward the Mahāyāna teachings. Asaṅga had a half-brother, Vasubandhu, who was a monk from the Sarvāstivāda school. Vasubandhu is said to have taken up Mahāyāna Buddhism after meeting with Asaṅga and one of Asaṅga's disciples.

Asaṅga spent many years in serious meditation and study under various teachers but the narrative of the 6th century monk Paramārtha states that he was unsatisfied with his understanding. Paramārtha then recounts how he used his meditative powers (siddhis) to travel to Tuṣita Heaven to receive teachings from Maitreya Bodhisattva on emptiness, and how he continued to travel to receive teachings from Maitreya on the Mahayana sutras.

Xuanzang (fl. c. 602 – 664), a Chinese monk who traveled to India to study in the Yogacara tradition tells a similar account of these events:

In the great mango grove five or six li to the southwest of the city (Ayodhya), there is an old monastery where Asaṅga Bodhisattva received instructions and guided the common people. At night he went up to the place of Maitreya Bodhisattva in Tuṣita Heaven to learn the Yogācārabhūmi-śāstra, the Mahāyāna-sūtra-alaṃkāra-śāstra, the Madhyānta-vibhāga-śāstra, etc.; in the daytime, he lectured on the marvelous principles to a great audience.

Modern scholars disagree on whether the figure of Maitreya in this story is to be considered as Asaṅga's human teacher or as a visionary experience in meditation. Scholars such as Frauwallner held that this figure, sometimes termed Maitreya-nātha, was an actual historical person and teacher. Other scholars argue that this figure was the tutelary deity of Asaṅga (Iṣṭa-devatā) as well as numerous other Yogacara masters, a point noted by the 6th century Indian monk Sthiramati. Whatever the case, Asaṅga's experiences led him to travel around India and propagate the Mahayana teachings. According to Taranatha's History of Buddhism in India, he founded 25 Mahayana monasteries in India.

Among the most famed monasteries that he established was Veluvana in Magadha region of what is now Bihar. It was here that he hand-picked eight chosen disciples who would all become famed in their own right and spread the Mahayana.

== Works ==
Asaṅga went on to write some key treatises (shastras) of the Yogācāra school. Over time, many different works were attributed to him (or to Maitreya, with Asaṅga as transmitter), although there are discrepancies between the Chinese and Tibetan traditions concerning which works are attributed to him. Modern scholars have also problematized and questioned these attributions after critical textual study of the sources. The many works attributed to this figure can be divided into the three following groups.

The first are three works which are widely agreed by ancient and modern scholars to be by Asaṅga:

- Mahāyānasaṃgraha (Summary of the Great Vehicle), a systematic exposition of the major tenets of the Yogacara school in ten chapters. Considered his magnum opus, survives in one Tibetan and four Chinese translations.
- Abhidharma-samuccaya, a short summary of the main Mahayana Abhidharma doctrines, in a traditional Buddhist Abhidharma style similar to non-Mahayana expositions. According to Walpola Rahula, the thought of this work is closer to that of the Pali Nikāyas than is that of the Theravadin Abhidhamma.
- Xianyang shengjiao lun, variously retranslated into Sanskrit as Āryadeśanāvikhyāpana, Āryapravacanabhāṣya, Prakaraṇāryaśāsanaśāstra, Śāsanodbhāvana, and Śāsanasphūrti. A work strongly based on the Yogācārabhūmi. Only available in Xuanzang's Chinese translation, but parallel Sanskrit passages can be found in the Yogācārabhūmi.

=== The Maitreya Corpus ===
The next group of texts are those that Tibetan hagiographies state were taught to Asaṅga by Maitreya and are thus known as the "Five Dharmas of Maitreya" in Tibetan Buddhist scholasticism. According to D.S. Ruegg, the "five works of Maitreya" are mentioned in Sanskrit sources from only the 11th century onwards. As noted by S.K. Hookham, their attribution to a single author has been questioned by modern scholars.

According to the Tibetan tradition, the so-called Asanga-Maitreya is:

- Mahāyānasūtrālamkāra-kārikā, ("The Adornment of Mahayana sutras", Tib. theg-pa chen-po'i mdo-sde'i rgyan), which presents the Mahāyāna path from the Yogācāra perspective and shows structural similarities with the Bodhisattvabhumi. There is a closely related commentary on this text, the Mahāyānasūtrālamkāra-bhāṣya. Some scholars, like Mario D'amato, have questioned the attribution of this text to Asanga-Maitreya. Instead, D'amato places this text (together with the commentary, which he considers the work of one author) after the Bodhisattvabhumi, but before the composition of Asanga's Mahāyānasaṃgraha (which quotes the Mahāyānasūtrālamkāra as an authoritative text).
- Madhyāntavibhāga-kārikā ("Distinguishing the Middle and the Extremes", Tib. dbus-dang mtha' rnam-par 'byed-pa), 112 verses that are a key work in Yogācāra philosophy. D'amato also places this text in the second phase of Yogacara scholarship, i.e. after the Bodhisattvabhumi, but before the classic works of Asanga and Vasubandhu.
- Dharmadharmatāvibhāga ("Distinguishing Phenomena and Pure Being", Tib. chos-dang chos-nyid rnam-par 'byed-pa), a short Yogācāra work discussing the distinction and correlation (vibhāga) between phenomena (dharma) and reality (dharmatā).
- Abhisamayalankara ( "Ornament for clear realization", Tib. mngon-par rtogs-pa'i rgyan), a verse text which attempts a synthesis of Prajñaparamita doctrine and Yogacara thought. There are differing scholarly opinions on authorship, John Makransky writes that it is possible the author was actually Arya Vimuktisena, the 6th century author of the first surviving commentary on this work. Makransky also notes that it is only the later 8th century commentator Haribhadra who attributes this text to Maitreya, but that this may have been a means to ascribe greater authority to the text. As Brunnhölzl notes, this text is also completely unknown in the Chinese Buddhist tradition.
- Ratnagotravibhaga (Exposition of the Jeweled lineage, Tib. theg-pa chen-po rgyud bla-ma'i bstan, a.k.a. Uttāratantra śāstra), a compendium on Buddha-nature attributed to Maitreya via Asaṅga by the Tibetan tradition. The Chinese tradition attributes it to a certain Sāramati (3rd-4th century CE), according to the Huayan patriarch Fazang. According to S.K. Hookham, modern scholarship favors Sāramati as the author of the RGV. She also notes there is no evidence for the attribution to Maitreya before the time of Maitripa (11th century). Peter Harvey concurs, finding the Tibetan attribution less plausible.

According to Karl Brunnhölzl, the Chinese tradition also speaks of five Maitreya-Asanga texts (first mentioned in Dunlun's Yujia lunji), "but considers them as consisting of the Yogācārabhūmi, *Yogavibhāga [now lost], Mahāyānasūtrālamkārakā, Madhyāntavibhāga and the Vajracchedikākāvyākhyā."

While the Yogācārabhūmi śāstra ("Treatise on the Levels of Spiritual Practitioners"), a massive and encyclopaedic work on yogic praxis, has traditionally been attributed to Asaṅga or Maitreya in toto, but most modern scholars now consider the text to be a compilation of various works by numerous authors, and different textual strata can be discerned within its contents. However, Asaṅga may still have participated in the compilation of this work.

The third group of texts associated with Asaṅga comprises two commentaries: the Kārikāsaptati, a work on the Vajracchedikā, and the Āryasaṃdhinirmocana-bhāṣya (Commentary on the Saṃdhinirmocana). The attribution of both of these to Asaṅga is not widely accepted by modern scholars.

== Bibliography ==
- Keenan, John P. (1989). Asaṅga's Understanding of Mādhyamika: Notes on the Shung-chung-lun, Journal of the International Association of Buddhist Studies 12 (1), 93–108
