= Bhiksu =

Bhiksu can refer to:

- Bhikṣu, Sanskrit for Bhikkhu, a Buddhist monk
- A monk who accepted Sannyasa, a Hindu renunciate
- Bhikshu (Jain monk) (1726–1803), founder of the Svetambar Terapanth sect of Jainism
- Bhiksu University of Sri Lanka, in Anuradhapura, Sri Lanka
