= Madhyanta-vibhaga-karika =

Key work in Buddhist philosophy of the Yogacara school

The Madhyāntavibhāgakārikā (Chinese: 辯中邊論頌; pinyin: Biàn zhōng biān lùn sòng), or Verses Distinguishing the Middle and the Extremes is a key work in Buddhist philosophy of the Yogacara school attributed in the Tibetan tradition to Maitreya-nātha and in other traditions to Asanga.

== Text ==
The Madhyānta-vibhāga-kārikā consists of 112 verses (kārikā) which delineate the distinctions (vibhāga) and relationship between the middle (madhya) view and the extremes (anta); it contains five chapters: Attributes (laksana), Obscurations (āvarana), Reality (tattva), Cultivation of Antidotes (pratipakṣa-bhāvanā) and the Supreme Way (yānānuttarya). Along with Chinese, Tibetan and Mongolian translations, the text survives in a single Sanskrit manuscript discovered in Tibet by the Indian Buddhologist and explorer, Rahul Sankrityayan. The Sanskrit version also included a commentary (bhāsya) by Vasubandhu. An important sub-commentary (tīkā) by Sthiramati also survives in Sanskrit as well as a Tibetan version.

== Editions and translations ==
A Sanskrit edition was prepared by Gadjin M. Nagao in 1964. The Madhyāntavibhāga-kārikā has been translated into English at least nine times, often with the Indian commentaries, in the following volumes:

- Mathyanta-Vibhanga, "Discource on Discrimination between Middle and Extremes" ascribed to Bodhisattva Maitreya and commented by Vasubhandu and Sthiramathi, translated from the sanscrit by Theodore Stcherbatsky, Bibliotheca Buddhica XXX, Academy of Sciences USSR Press, Moscow/Leningrad 1936.
- Madhyāntavibhāga-ṭikā: An Analysis of the Middle Path and the Extremes by David Lasar Friedmann. Rijksuniversiteit te Leiden. 1937
- A Buddhist Doctrine of Experience: A New Translation and Interpretation of the Works of Vasubandhu the Yogacarin by Thomas Kochumuttom. Motilal Banarsidass. Delhi: 1982.
- Seven Works of Vasubandhu by Stefan Anacker. Motilal Banarsidass, Delhi: 1984
- The Principles of Buddhist Psychology by David J. Kalupahana. State University of New York Press. Albany: 1987
- A Study of the Madhyāntavibhāga-bhāṣya-ṭikā by Richard Stanley. Doctoral dissertation, Australian National University, April, 1988
- Mind Only: A Philosophical and Doctrinal Analysis of the Vijnanavada by Thomas E. Wood. University of Hawaii Press. 1991
- Middle Beyond Extremes: Maitreya's Madhyantavibhaga with Commentaries by Khenpo Shenga and Ju Mipham by the Dharmachakra Translation Committee. Snow Lion Publications. Ithaca: 2007. ISBN 1-55939-270-3
- Distinguishing the Middle and the Extremes by Asaṅga, Commentary by Vasubandhu: Draft Translation with brief annotations. by John D. Dunne. Unpublished.
- Maitreya's Distinguishing the Middle from the Extremes (Madhyāntavibhāga): Along with Vasubandhu's Commentary (Madhyāntavibhāga-Bhāṣya): A Study and Annotated Translation by D'Amato, Mario. New York, American Institute of Buddhist Studies 2012. ISBN 9781935011057
