= Mahayana-sutra-alamkara-karika =

Buddhist philosophy

Mahāyāna-sūtrālamkāra-kārikā (transl. 'Verses on the Ornament of the Mahāyāna Sūtras') is a major work of Buddhist philosophy attributed to Maitreya-nātha which is said to have transmitted it to Asanga (ca. 320 to ca. 390 CE). The Mahāyāna-sūtrālamkāra, written in verse, presents the Mahayana path from the Yogacara perspective. It comprises twenty-two chapters with a total of 800 verses and shows considerable similarity in arrangement and content to the Bodhisattvabhūmiśāstra, although the interesting first chapter proving the validity and authenticity of Mahāyāna is unique to this work. Associated with it is a prose commentary (bhāṣya) by Vasubandhu and several sub-commentaries by Sthiramati and others; the portions by Maitreya-nātha and Vasubandhu both survive in Sanskrit as well as Tibetan, Chinese, and Mongolian translations.

== Overview ==
According to Richard K. Payne, the Mahāyāna-sūtrālamkāra is structured as follows:

The text is organized into five unequal parts, and it is the progress of topics through these five that constitutes the author’s discursive intent. The first step is to convince readers of the text that the Mahāyāna teachings are valid, that they are buddhadharma (Part One: Chapters 1 and 2). Next, the intent is to convince readers of the superiority of the Mahāyāna, so as to instill enthusiasm for it (Part Two: Chapters 3, 4, 5 and 6). The authors explain the meaning of the key concepts as part of the intellectual grounding of the Mahāyāna (Part Three: chapters 7, 8 and 9). Then the result of practice, the goal of perfected full awakening, is described (Part Four: Chapter 10). And finally, the path of practice is described in full (Part Five: Chapters 11 through 21).

== In English translation ==
The Mahayanasutralamkara has been translated into English three times.

1. In 2004 as Universal Vehicle Discourse Literature by Lobsang Jamspal, Robert Thurman and the American Institute of Buddhist Studies translation committee.
2. In 2014 as The Ornament of the Great Vehicle Sutras by the Dharmachakra Translation Committee, in particular Thomas Doctor. This includes the Tibetan Nyingma scholar Mipham Rinpoche's commentary as well as Khenpo Shenga's annotations.
3. In 2018 as The Feast of the Nectar of the Supreme Vehicles by the Padmakara Translation Group. It includes the commentary of Mipham Rinpoche as well as extensive footnotes.

== Bibliography ==
- Sylvain Lévi, transl. (1911). Mahāyāna-Sūtrālaṃkāra : exposé de la doctrine du Grand Véhicule selon le système Yogācāra / Asaṅga. Éd. et trad. d'après un manuscrit rapporté du Népal - Tome 2: Traduction, introduction, index. - Paris : Librairie Honoré Champion
- Buswell, Robert Jr; Lopez, Donald S. Jr., eds. (2013). Princeton Dictionary of Buddhism (Mahāyānasūtrālamkāra). Princeton, NJ: Princeton University Press. pp. 514–515. ISBN 9780691157863.
