= Erich Frauwallner =

Austrian Indologist

Erich Frauwallner (December 28, 1898 – July 5, 1974) was an Austrian professor and a pioneer in the field of Buddhist studies.

== Career and life ==
Frauwallner studied classical philology and Sanskrit philology in Vienna. He taught Indology from 1928-29 at the University of Vienna. His primary interest was Buddhist logic and epistemology, and later Indian Brahmanic philosophy, with close attention to primary source texts.

In 1938 Frauwallner joined the Department of Indian and Iranian philosophy at the Oriental Institute after its Jewish director, Bernhard Geiger, was forced out; Frauwallner became director in 1942. He was called up for military service in 1943 but did not serve, continuing to teach until 1945 when he lost his position due to his Nazi Party membership (dating to 1932). In 1951, after a review, he was reinstated. In 1955 he founded the Institute for Indology and acted as its chairperson. He became a full professor in 1960.

Donald S. Lopez, Jr., a professor of Buddhist and Tibetan studies at the University of Michigan, called Frauwallner "one of the great Buddhist scholars of this [the twentieth] century."

== Influence of his Nazi views on his scholarship ==
Frauwallner was a willing Nazi party member in Vienna, from 1932 onwards. He benefited professionally and personally from his Nazi party membership. He was only ousted from his university position after the downfall of Nazi Germany in 1945. Questions have been raised concerning the appropriateness of his later reinstatement at Vienna University, which form part of the larger and ongoing question of Austria's cultural processing of the Nazi elements of its past. The question for the history of scholarship is, to what extent did his Nazi beliefs impact on his indological scholarship and his views about the history of Indian philosophy? This question has been taken up by Professors Karin Preisendanz and Eli Franco and others. The general conclusion is that there are aspects of Frauwallner's history of philosophy that are untrustworthy because of his racist presuppositions, and especially his tendency to consider that thinkers may never change their minds, and to see philosophical viewpoints as arising out of "soil and blood" in an essentialist manner. Frauwallner also tended to construct historical narratives using the nineteenth-century concept of degeneration to argue that simple, original, pure forms of philosophy gradually changed into more complex, degenerate forms, identifying complexity with decadence. Such interpretative schemes are no longer acceptable in the contemporary academy.

Other parts of his work are still useful today, such as his work on reconstructing the text of the Vādavidhi.

== Works ==
- On the date of the Buddhist master of the law, Vasubandhu, Rome, Istituto italiano per il Medio ed Estremo Oriente (Is.M.E.O.) 1951.
- The Earliest Vinaya and the Beginnings of Buddhist Literature, Rome, Is.M.E.O., 1956.
- Geschichte der indischen Philosophie, I, Salzburg, Otto Müller, 1953. ISBN 3832210768 (History of Indian Philosophy, Vol. I, translated by V. M. Bedekar, Delhi, Motilal Barnasiddas, 1973).
- Geschichte der indischen Philosophie, II, Salzburg, Otto Müller, 1956. ISBN 383222226X (History of Indian Philosophy, Vol. II, translated by V. M. Bedekar, Delhi, Motilal Barnasiddas, 1973).
- "Landmarks in the History of Indian Logic", in Wiener Zeitschrift für die Kunde Süd- und Ostasiens und Archiv für indische Philosophie für das indologische Institut der Universität Wien,, 5, 1961, pp. 125-148.
- Die Philosophie des Buddhismus, Frankfurt, Akademie Verlag, 1969.
- Erich Frauwallner's Posthumous Essays, translated from the German by Jayandra Soni, New Delhi, Aditya Prakashan, 1994.
- Studies in Abhidharma Literature and the Origins of Buddhist Philosophical Systems, Albany, State University of New York Press, 1995.
