= Vasubandhu =

4th/5th century Buddhist monk

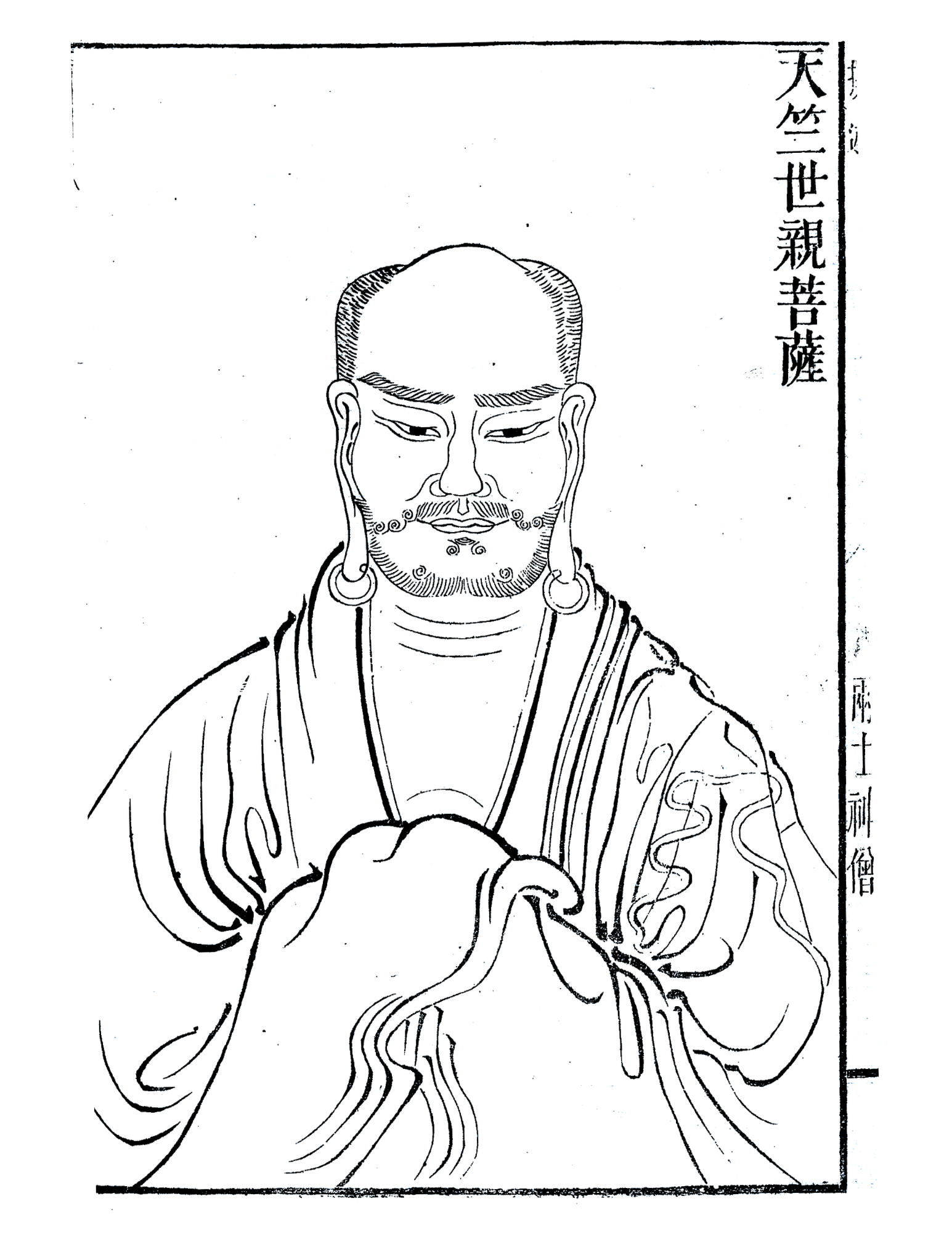
- Vasubandhu as a founding master of the Yogācāra school in a Chinese woodblock print collection "Portraits of the Buddha and Ancestral Masters" 佛祖正宗道影 (1880) by the Chinese monk Shouyi 守一.

Personal life
- Born: c. 4/5th century CE
- Died: c. 4/5th century CE Saketa
- Education: Nalanda

Religious life
- Religion: Buddhism
- School: Mahayana

Vasubandhu (traditional Chinese: 世親; ; pinyin: Shìqīn; Tibetan: དབྱིག་གཉེན་ Wylie: dbyig gnyen; fl. 4th to 5th century CE) was an influential Indian Buddhist monk and scholar. He was a philosopher who wrote commentary on the Abhidharma, from the perspectives of the Sarvastivada and Sautrāntika schools. After his conversion to Mahayana Buddhism, along with his half-brother, Asanga, he was also one of the main founders of the Yogacara school.

Vasubandhu's Abhidharmakośakārikā ("Commentary on the Treasury of the Abhidharma") is widely used in Tibetan and East Asian Buddhism, as the major source for non-Mahayana Abhidharma philosophy. His philosophical verse works set forth the standard for the Indian Yogacara metaphysics of "appearance only" (vijñapti-mātra), which has been described as a form of "epistemological idealism", phenomenology and close to Immanuel Kant's transcendental idealism. Apart from this, he wrote several commentaries, works on logic, argumentation and devotional poetry.

Vasubandhu is one of the most influential thinkers in the Indian Buddhist philosophical tradition. Because of their association with Nalanda university, Vasubandhu and Asanga are amongst the so-called Seventeen Nalanda Masters. In Jōdo Shinshū, he is considered the Second Patriarch; in Chan Buddhism, he is the 21st Patriarch.

== Life and works ==
Different sources provide different places for Vasubandhu's birthplace. Xuanzang states that Vasubandhu was born in Gandhara however Buton Rinchen Drup places Vasubandhu in Central India. Vasubandhu's name means "the Kinsman of Abundance." Tibetan Buddhism sees the two brothers as part of the six great Indian commentators called the "Six Ornaments". He was contemporaneous with Chandragupta I, father of Samudragupta. This information temporally places this Vasubandhu in the 4th century CE. The earliest biography of Vasubandhu was translated into Chinese by Paramärtha (499-569).

Vasubandhu initially studied with the Buddhist Sarvāstivāda (also called Vaibhāṣika, who upheld the Mahavibhasa commentary) school which was dominant in Gandhara, and later moved to Kashmir to study with the heads of the orthodox Sarvastivada branch there. After returning home, he lectured on Abhidharma and composed the Abhidharmakośakārikā (Verses on the Treasury of the Abhidharma), a verse distillation of Sarvastivada Abhidharma teachings, which was an analysis of all factors of experience into its constituent dharmas (phenomenal events). However Vasubandhu had also begun to question Sarvāstivāda-Vaibhāṣika view for some time, and had studied with the Sautrāntika teacher, Manoratha. Thus, his auto-commentary to his Abhidharma verses sometimes criticize the Vaibhāṣika system from a Sautrāntika viewpoint. However, the work is not always critical of Vaibhāṣika, and in some cases, it also defends the orthodox Vaibhasika position. The Abhidharmakośa remains the main source for Abhidharma studies in both Tibetan Buddhism and East Asian Buddhism.

Vasubandhu is later said to have converted to Mahayana beliefs under the influence of his brother Asanga, whereupon he composed a number of Yogacara treatises and Mahayana sutra commentaries. Some of his most influential Mahayana works have been the Twenty Verses on Consciousness Only (Vimśatikāvijñaptimātratāsiddhi), with its commentary (Viṃśatikāvṛtti), the Thirty Verses on Consciousness-only (Triṃśikā-vijñaptimātratā) and his Discourse on the Pure Land (Jìngtǔ lùn 浄土論). The Thirty Verses is the basis for Xuanzang's Cheng Wei Shi Lun, one of the most important sources in East Asian Yogacara Buddhism. His Pure Land treatise was also very influential on East Asian Pure Land Buddhism.

In India, Vasubandhu became known as a major Mahayana master, scholar and debater. He is reported to have defeated Samkhya philosophers in debate in front of the Gupta king "Vikramaditya" (variously identified as Chandragupta II or Skandagupta) at Ayodhya, who is said to have rewarded him with 300,000 pieces of gold. Vasubandhu used the money he made from royal patronage and debating victories to build Buddhist monasteries and hospitals.

As per traditional accounts, Vasubandhu died while visiting Ayodhya at the age of 100.

=== Attributed works ===
Vasubandhu was prolific author of Buddhist treatises and commentaries. A list of his key works includes:

==== Treatises ====
- Viṃśatikā-vijñaptimātratāsiddhi (Twenty Verses Demonstrating Consciousness Only)
- Triṃśikā-vijñaptimātratā (Thirty Verses on Consciousness Only
- Pañcaskandhaprakaraṇa (Explanation of the Five Aggregates)
- Karmasiddhiprakarana (A Treatise on Establishing Karma)
- Vyākhyāyukti (Proper Mode of Exposition), a text on Buddhist Hermeneutics,
- Vādavidhi (Rules for Debate), a text of formal epistemology (pramana) theory and debate
- *Mahāyāna śatadharmā-prakāśamukha śāstra (Baifa mingmen lun 百法明門論, Lucid Introduction to the One Hundred Dharmas, T 1614)
- Trisvabhāva-nirdeśa (Exposition on the Three Natures) - some scholars question the attribution of this text to Vasubandhu (or at least argue that this is a late work of his which differs in various respects from other works).
- Paramārthasaptati, a critique of Samkhya philosophy

==== Commentaries ====
- Catuhśataka-śāstra (A commentary on Aryadeva's Four Hundred Verses)
- Mahāyānasaṃgraha-bhāṣya (Commentary to the Summary of the Great Vehicle of Asanga)
- Dharmadharmatāvibhāga-vṛtti (Commentary on Distinguishing Elements from Reality)
- Madhyāntavibhāga-bhāṣya (Commentary on Distinguishing the Middle from the Extremes)
- Mahāyānasūtrālaṃkāra-bhāṣya (Commentary on the Ornament to the Great Vehicle Discourses), this attribution has been questioned by some scholars.
- Amitayus sutropadeśa (Instruction on the Sukhāvatīvyūha Sūtra), also called "Discourse on the Pure Land" (Jìngtǔ lùn 浄土論).
- Dasabhūmika-bhāsya (Commentary on the Ten Stages Sutra)
- Commentary on the Aksayamatinirdesa-sutra
- Commentary on the Diamond Sutra
- Commentary on the Lotus Sutra
- Treatise on the Nirvana Sutra (Nirvāṇaśāstra, Ch: Niepan Lun 涅槃論 T1527), translated by Dharmabodhi

=== Two Vasubandhus theory ===
Erich Frauwallner, a mid-20th-century Buddhologist, sought to distinguish two Vasubandhus, one the Yogācārin and the other a Sautrāntika, but this view has largely fallen from favour in part on the basis of the anonymous Abhidharma-dīpa, a critique of the Abhidharmakośakārikā which clearly identifies Vasubandhu as the sole author of both groups of writings. According to Dan Lusthaus, "Since the progression and development of his thought ... is so strikingly evident in these works, and the similarity of vocabulary and style of argument so apparent across the texts, the theory of Two Vasubandhus has little merit." Scholarly consensus on this question has generally moved away from Frauwallner's "two-authors" position.

== Philosophy ==
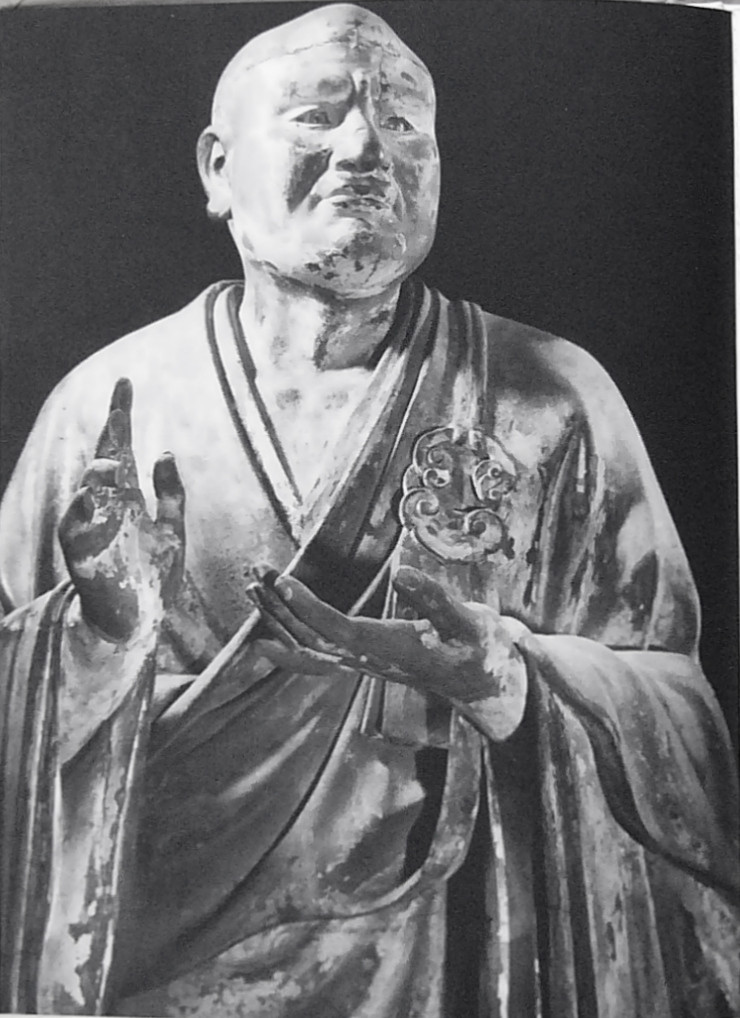
Vasubandhu: Wood, 186 cm height, about 1208, Kofukuji Temple, Nara, Japan

=== Abhidharma ===
Vasubandhu's Verses on the Treasury of the Abhidharma contains a description of all 75 dharmas (phenomenal events), and then outlines the entire Sarvastivada doctrine including "meditation practices, cosmology, theories of perception, causal theories, the causes and elimination of moral problems, the theory of rebirth, and the qualities of a Buddha." The Treasury and its commentary also expound all kinds of arguments relating to the Sarvastivada Abhidharma and critique those arguments from a Sautantrika perspective in the commentary. Major arguments include an extensive critique of the Self (Atman and Pudgala) and a critique of the Sarvastivada theory of "the existence of the dharmas of the three time periods [past, present and future]". In the Treasury, Vasubadhu also argued against a Creator God (Ishvara) and against the Sarvastivada theory of avijñaptirūpa ("unperceived physicality" or "invisible physicality").

=== Critique of the self ===
Vasubandhu's critique of the self is a defence of Buddhist Anatman doctrine, and also a critique of the Buddhist Personalist School and Hindu view of the soul. It is intended to show the unreality of the self or person as over and above the five skandhas (heaps, aggregates which make up an individual). Vasubandhu begins by outlining the soteriological motive for his argument, writing that any view which sees the self as having independent reality (e.g. the Hindu view) is not conducive to Nirvana.

Vasubandhu then evaluates the idea of the Self from epistemic grounds (Pramana). Vasubandhu states that what is real can only be known from perception (Pratyakṣa) or inference (Anumāṇa). Perception allows one to observe directly the objects of the six sense spheres. Inference allows one to infer the existence of sense organs. However, there is no such inference for a solid real Self apart from the stream of constantly changing sense perceptions and mental activity of the sense spheres.

Vasubandhu also argues that because the Self is not causally efficient, it is mere convention (prajñapti) and a "conceptual construction" (parikalpita). This argument is mainly against the Buddhist Pudgalavada school who held a view of a 'person' that was dependent on the five aggregates, yet was also distinct, in order to account for the continuity of personality. Vasubandhu sees this as illogical: for him, the Self is made up of constantly changing sensory organs, sense impressions, ideas and mental processes. Any imagined unity of self-hood is a false projection.

Vasubandhu also uses this analysis of the stream of consciousness to attack non-Buddhist Hindu views of the Atman. Vasubandhu shows that the Hindu view of the Self as 'controller' is refuted by an analysis of the flux and disorder of mental events and the inability of the supposed Self to control our minds and thoughts in any way we would like. If the Self is truly an eternal un-caused agent, it should be unaffected by mere physical and mental causes, and it also seems difficult to explain how such a force existing independently outside of the mind could causally interact with it. Vasubandhu also answers several common objections to the Buddhist not-self view such as how karma works without a Self and what exactly undergoes rebirth. Vasubandhu points to the causal continuum of aggregates/processes which undergoes various changes leading to future karmic events and rebirth.

=== Momentariness ===
During Vasubandhu's era, the philosophy of space and time was an important issue in Buddhist philosophy. The Sarvāstivādin tradition which Vasubandhu studied held the view of the existence of dharmas (phenomenal events) in all three times (past, present, future). This was said to be their defining theoretical position, hence their name Sarvāstivāda is Sanskrit for "theory of all exists". In contrast to this eternalist view, the Sautrāntika, a rival offshoot, held the doctrine of "extreme momentariness", a form of presentism (only the present moment exists).

In the Abhidharmakośakārikā, Vasubandhu puts forth the Sarvāstivādin theory, and then in his commentary (bhasya) he critiques this theory and argues for the 'momentariness' of the Sautrāntika. He also later wrote the Karma-siddhi-prakaraṇa ("Exposition Establishing Karma") which also expounded the momentariness view (kṣanikavāda). Vasubandhu's view here is that each dharma comes into existence only for a moment in which it discharges its causal efficacy and then self-destructs, the stream of experience is then a causal series of momentary dharmas. The issue of continuity and transference of karma is explained in the latter text by an exposition of the "storehouse consciousness" (ālayavijñāna), which stores karmic seeds (bīja) and survives rebirth.

=== Yogacara theories ===
According to Dan Lusthaus, Vasubandhu's major ideas are:

- "Whatever we are aware of, think about, experience, or conceptualize, occurs to us nowhere else than within consciousness."
- "External objects do not exist."
- "Karma is collective and consciousness is intersubjective."
- "All factors of experience (dharmas) can be catalogued and analyzed."
- "Buddhism is a method for purifying the stream of consciousness from 'contaminations' and 'defilements.'"
- "Each individual has eight types of consciousness, but Enlightenment (or Awakening) requires overturning their basis, such that consciousness (vijñaana) is 'turned' into unmediated cognition (jñaana)."

=== Appearance only ===
Vasubandhu's main Yogacara works (Viṃśatikā and Triṃśikā) put forth the theory of "vijñaptimātra" which has been rendered variously as 'representation-only', 'consciousness-only' and 'appearance-only'. While some scholars such as Lusthaus see Vasubandhu as expounding a phenomenology of experience, others (Sean Butler) see him as expounding some form of Idealism similar to Kant or George Berkeley.

The Twenty verses begins by stating:

In Mahayana philosophy...[reality is] viewed as being consciousness-only...Mind (citta), thought (manas), consciousness (chit), and perception (pratyaksa) are synonyms. The word "mind" (citta) includes mental states and mental activities in its meaning. The word "only" is intended to deny the existence of any external objects of consciousness. We recognize, of course, that "mental representations seem to be correlated with external (non-mental) objects; but this may be no different from situations in which people with vision disorders 'see' hairs, moons, and other things that are 'not there.'"

One of Vasubandhu's main arguments in the Twenty verses is the Dream argument, which he uses to show that it is possible for mental representations to appear to be restricted by space and time. He uses the example of mass hallucinations (in Buddhist hell) to defend against those who would doubt that mental appearances can be shared. To counter the argument that mere mental events have no causal efficacy, he uses the example of a wet dream. Vasubandhu then turns to a mereological critique of physical theories, such as Buddhist atomism and Hindu Monism, showing that his appearance only view is much more parsimonious and rational.

The Thirty verses also outlines the Yogacara theory of the Eight Consciousnesses and how each one can be overcome by the stages of enlightenment, turning consciousness (vijnana) into unmediated cognition (jnana) by cleansing the stream of consciousness from ‘contaminations' and ‘defilements.’ The Treatise on Buddha Nature was extremely influential in East Asian Buddhism by propounding the concept of tathagatagarbha (Buddha Nature).

=== Three natures and non-duality ===
The Thirty verses and the "Three Natures Exposition" (Trisvabhavanirdesha) does not, like the Twenty verses, argue for appearance only, but assumes it and uses it to explain the nature of experience which is of "three natures" or "three modes". These are the fabricated nature (parikalpitasvabhāva), the dependent (paratantrasvabhāva) and the absolute (pariniṣpannasvabhāva). The fabricated nature is the world of everyday experience and mental appearances. Dependent nature is the causal process of the arising of the fabricated nature while the absolute nature is things as they are in themselves, with no subject object distinction.

According to Vasubandhu, the absolute, reality itself (dharmatā) is non-dual, and the dichotomy of perception into perceiver and perceived is actually a conceptual fabrication. For Vasubandhu, to say that something is non-dual is that it is both conceptually non-dual and perceptually non-dual. To say that "I" exist is to conceptually divide the causal flux of the world into self and other, a false construct. Just the same, to say that an observed object is separate from the observer is also to impute a false conception into the world as it really is - perception only. Vasubandhu uses the analogy of a magician who uses a magic spell (dependent nature, conceptual construction) to make a piece of wood (the absolute, non-duality) look like an elephant (fabricated nature, duality). The basic problem for living beings who suffer is that they are fooled by the illusion into thinking that it is real, that self and duality exists, true wisdom is seeing through this illusion.

=== Logic ===
Vasubandhu contributed to Buddhist logic and is held to have been the origin of formal logic in the Indian logico-epistemological tradition. He was particularly interested in formal logic to fortify his contributions to the traditions of dialectical contestability and debate. Anacker (2005: p. 31) holds that:

A Method for Argumentation (Vāda-vidhi) is the only work on logic by Vasabandhu which has to any extent survived. It is the earliest of the treatises known to have been written by him on the subject. This is all the more interesting because Vāda-vidhi marks the dawn of Indian formal logic. The title, "Method for Argumentation", indicates that Vasabandhu's concern with logic was primarily motivated by the wish to mould formally flawless arguments, and is thus a result of his interest in philosophical debate.

This text also paved the way for the later developments of Dignaga and Dharmakirti in the field of logic.

== Works ==
- Abhidharma Kosha Bhashyam 4 vols, Vasubandhu, translated into English by Leo Pruden (based on Louis de La Vallée-Poussin’s French translation), Asian Humanities Press, Berkeley, 1988-90.
- L’Abhidharmakosa de Vasubandhu, traduit et annoté par Louis de La Vallée-Poussin, Paul Geuthner, Paris, 1923-1931 vol.1 vol.2 vol.3 vol.4 vol.5 vol.6 Internet Archive (PDF)
- Stefan Anacker, Seven Works of Vasubandhu Motilal Banarsidass, Delhi, 1984, 1998
- Ernst Steinkellner and Xuezhu Li (eds), Vasubandhu's Pañcaskandhaka (Wien, Verlag der Österreichischen Akademie der Wissenschaften, 2008) (Sanskrit Texts from the Tibetan Autonomous Region, 4).
- Dharmamitra, trans.; Vasubandhu's Treatise on the Bodhisattva Vow, Kalavinka Press 2009, ISBN 978-1-935413-09-7
