= Dharma-dharmata-vibhaga =

Dharma-dharmatā-vibhāga (Chinese: 辨法法性論; pinyin: Biàn fǎ fǎ xìng lùn; Distinguishing Dharmas and Dharmata) is a short Yogācāra work, attributed to Maitreya-nātha, which discusses the distinction and correlation (vibhāga) between phenomena (dharma) and reality (dharmatā); the work exists in both a prose and a verse version and survives only in Tibetan translation. However, the Sanskrit original was reported to exist in Tibet during the 1930s by the Indian Buddhologist and explorer, Rahul Sankrityayan.

== In English translation ==
The Dharmadharmata-vibhaga was translated into English by Jim Scott in 2004 It was also translated by Klaus Dieter Mathes (1996, into German), by Cha (1996), by the Dharmachakra Translation Committee (2013), by Karl Brunnholzl (2014), Raymond Robertson (2014) and more recently Diane Denis (2022, into French).
