= Lotsawa =

Title to refer to the native Tibetan translators

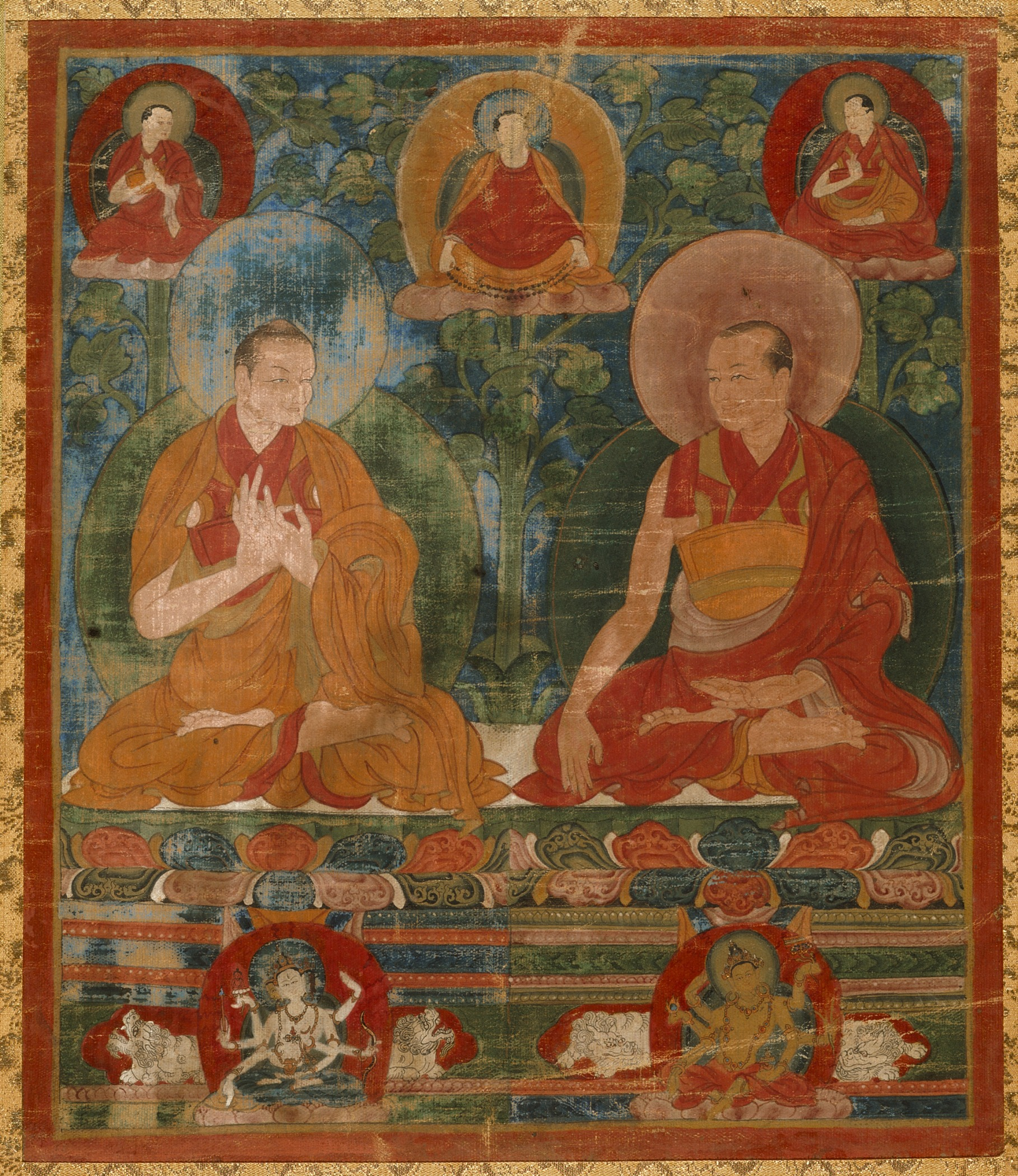
Sakyasri and Thropu Lotsawa of the Trophu Kagyu

Lotsawa (Tibetan: ལོ་ཙཱ་བ་, Wylie: lo tsA ba) is a Tibetan title used to refer to the Nyingma's Ancient Translation School of 108 Tibetan translators, which include Vairotsana, Rinchen Zangpo, Marpa Lotsawa, Tropu Lotsawa Jampa Pel and many others. They worked alongside Indian scholars, or panditas, to prepare the first translation into the Tibetan language of the Kangyur and Tengyur of the Buddhist Canon, from original texts written in Pali, Sanskrit, Classical Chinese, Buddihist Hybrid Sanskrit and other Asian languages. Working under the direction of Padmasambhava and Shantarakshita in the 8th century, their patron was King Trisong Detsen. The term is also used to refer to modern-day translators of Tibetan Buddhist texts.

Lotsawa is thought to derive from the Sanskrit word licchavi, a privileged ancient and medieval Indo-Aryan tribe and dynasty. TAnother theory has it that the term is a transliteration of the Sanskrit compound lokacakṣu, literally "eye of the world" or more symbolically, "the Sun".

Jnanasutra, a Nyingma, was the principal lotsawa of the first wave of translations from Sanskrit to Tibetan.

Yudra Nyingpo, one of the chief disciples of Vairotsana, was also a principal lotsawa of the first translation stage of texts into Tibetan.

== See also ==
- Rinchen Zangpo
- Marpa Lotsawa
