= Tibetan Buddhist canon =

Defined list of sacred texts recognized by various schools of Tibetan Buddhism

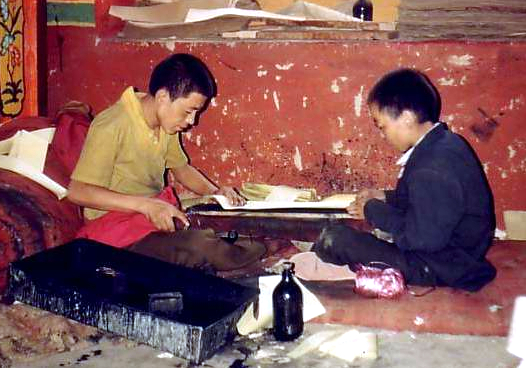
Young monks printing scriptures. Sera Monastery, Tibet. 1993

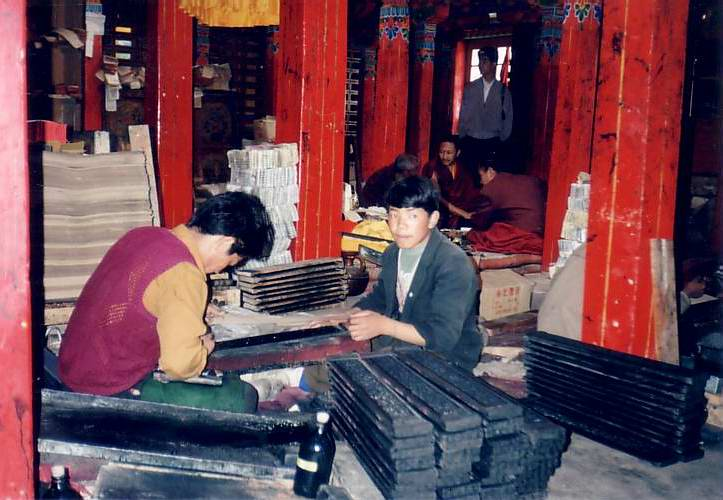
Printing the scriptures, Sera Monastery

The Tibetan Buddhist canon is a compilation of the Buddhist sacred texts recognized by various schools of Tibetan Buddhism. The Canon includes the Kangyur, which is the Buddha's recorded teachings, and the Tengyur, which is commentaries by great masters on the Buddha's recorded teachings. The first translation into Tibetan of these manuscripts occurred in the 8th century and is referred to as the Ancient Translation School of the Nyingmas.

The Tibetan Canon underwent another compilation in the 14th century by Buton Rinchen Drub (1290–1364). Again, the Tibetans divided the Buddhist texts into two broad categories:

- Kangyur (Wylie: bka'-'gyur) or "Translated Words or Vacana", consists of works to have been said by the Buddha himself. All texts presumably have a Sanskrit original, although in many cases the Tibetan text was translated from Pali, Chinese, or other languages.
- Tengyur (Wylie: bstan-'gyur) or "Translated Treatises or Shastras", is the section to which were assigned commentaries, treatises and abhidharma works (both Mahayana and non-Mahayana). The Tengyur contains 3626 texts in 224 Volumes.

The Canon includes all of the Buddha's teachings and the commentaries on all three Buddhist vehicles (yānas): Early Buddhism (nikāya/āgama sūtras), Mahāyāna (sūtras), and Vajrayāna (tantric texts).

In addition to sutrayana texts from Early Buddhist schools (mostly Sarvastivada) and Mahayana sources, the Tibetan canon includes tantric texts.

Famous scholars who have researched on the Tibetan Buddhist Canon include Helmut Eimer, Paul Harrison, Peter Skilling and Helmut Tauscher.

== Kangyur ==
The Kangyur is divided into sections on Vinaya, Perfection of Wisdom Sutras, Avatamsaka, Ratnakuta and other sutras (75% Mahayana, 25% Nikaya/Agama or Hinayana), and tantras. When exactly the term Kangyur was first used is not known. Collections of canonical Buddhist texts already existed in the time of Trisong Detsen, the sixth king of Tibet.

The exact number of texts in the Kangyur is not fixed. Each editor takes responsibility for removing texts he considers spurious or adding new translations. Currently there are about 12 available Kangyurs. These include the Derge, Lhasa, Narthang, Cone, Peking, Urga, Phudrak and Stog Palace versions, each named after the physical location of its printing (or copying in the case of manuscripts editions). In addition, some canonical texts have been found in Tabo and Dunhuang which provide earlier exemplars to texts found in the Kangyur. The majority of extant Kangyur editions appear to stem from the so-called Old Narthang Kangyur, though the Phukdrak and Tawang editions are thought to lie outside of that textual lineage. The stemma of the Kangyur have been well researched in particular by Helmut Eimer and Paul Harrison.

=== History ===
==== Origin ====
From the seventh century onward, existing literature were compiled and catalogued from time to time which later extended, upgraded, classified, reorganized and put in different sets of different collections. A separate set of translation works was re-grouped into two major collections popularly known as bka'-'gyur and bstan-'gyur, translation of Buddha's discourses and translation of commentarial works respectively. The very first Tibetan catalogue was introduced during the period of the 39th Tibetan King khri-lde srong-btsen, also known as sad-na legs-mjing-gyon (776–815), who issued decrees "requiring all translation works that were extant in Tibetan from their Indian original to be catalogued and subjected to be recurrently reviewed and to set guidelines of terminology in order to standardize all translation works". A team of Indian and Tibetan scholars was assigned for the purpose.

As a major step in this remarkable attempt at literary standardization, the bi-lingual glossary known as the Mahavyutpatti (sgra-sbyor bam-po gnyis-pa) was successfully accomplished in the Tibetan horse year (814 CE). Another great achievement was the cataloguing of the collections then available in royal libraries of the three famous Tibetan palaces under the supervision of the famous translator Bande sKa-ba dpal-brtsegs with help from his colleagues, Bande chos-kyi snying-po, Lo-tsa-wa Bande debendhara, Bande lhun-po and Bande klu'-dbang-po etc. The earliest catalogue compilation was recorded from the manuscript of the royal collection housed in the palace- pho-brang 'phang-thang ka-med kyi gtsug-lag-kang in the Tibetan dog year (818 CE). This cataloguing work became famous by the name of the palace and known as dkar-chag phang-thang-ma. Soon afterwards two further catalogues of collections available in two other royal libraries- pho-brang bsam-yas mchims-phu-ma and pho-brang stong-thang ldan-dkar were compiled and came to be known as dkar-chag mchims-phu-ma and dkar-chag ldan-dkar-ma respectively. dkar-chag ldan-dkar-ma was compiled in the dragon year (824 CE).

Among these three catalogues, ldan-dkar-ma, included in the volume Jo of sna-tsogs in sde-ge bka'-bstan, is generally believed to be the only surviving so far. But recently a manuscript of dkar-chag phang-thang-ma is discovered and published from Tibet. It contains 961 titles listed under 34 subject headings with additional information of numbers of verses (soloka and bampo) that contains in each text. The ldan-dkar-ma catalogue comprises 735 titles and listed under a category of 27 subject headings. An interesting unique feature of Tibetan catalogue is that, alongside information about the source material of translation and the bibliographical details, it gives in physical descriptions, such as the nos. of words, verses, canto (bampo) and folios-pages in each of textual contents. Thus today we have a record of 73 million words contained in the bka'-'gyur & bstan-'gyur collection. According to the latest edition of Dharma Publication, the bKa'-'gyur contains 1,115 texts, spread over 65,420 Tibetan folios amounting to 450,000 lines or 25 million words. Likewise, the bsTan-'gyur contains 3,387 texts using 127,000 folios amounting to 850,000 lines and 48 million words. The sum total of both these collections is 4,502 texts in 73 million words. By fixing bampo to verses and to words of each of the textual contents, the individual works are interpolation and alteration. This further strengthened the authenticity of Tibetan Buddhist literature. These are the first Tibetan catalogues in three versions that were compiled and published in the beginning of the ninth century by the great sgra-sgyur gyi lo-tsa-wa Bande sKa-ba dpal-brtsegs and his team. Tibet, thus, becomes the earliest to accomplish catalogue as inventory in the history of evolution of catalogue. Bande sKa-ba dpal-brtsegs is thus, honored as the pioneer of the Tibetan system. All the later compilers of the Tibetan Canon based their works extensively on sKa-ba dpal-brtsegs creation.

After the period of suppression during the reign of King glang-dar-ma's (803–842) which brought the first chapter of the history of Tibetan literature to an abrupt end, the second phase in its development is reactivated. Since the beginning of 11th century onward Tibetan translators together with Indian panditas once again resumed their literary activity to bring about a new chapter to be known as "the era of new translation" and also "revival or later promulgation of Buddhism in Tibet". In addition to the previous works Tibet has produced a huge literary wealth both in terms of volume and range of coverage by the 13th century and this growth imposed to carry a fresh comprehensive bibliographical record and control existing literature.

==== Later period ====
In the mid-13th century a student of bcom-ldan rigs-ral (1200?), 'Jam-gag pak-shi, also known as mchims 'jam-dpal dbyangs (?–1267), who was the state priest of the Mongol emperor Ching Tsung, had managed to collect some amount of writing material and sent to his master with request for organizing and preparing catalogue of literature that were scattered all over Tibet. bcom-ldan rigs-ral with the help of his pupils dbu-pa blo-gsal byang-chub ye-shes, lo tsa-wa bsod-nams 'od-zer and rgyang-ro byang-chub 'bum, surveyed various parts mostly covering central and western Tibet. Authenticating and rectifying, they carefully scrutinize all the manuscripts of old and new translations and arranged them in order, compiling a comprehensive catalogue of a proto-bka'-'gyur & bstan-'gyur. The catalogue was prepared into two sets of collections, entitled the dkar-chag bstan-pa rgyas-pa and dka-'gyur gyi dkar-chag nyi-ma'i 'od-zer respectively. Classification of Tibetan Buddhist canon or translation works into two main classes as bka'-'gyur & bstan-'gyur is basically derived from this catalogue.

'Jam-gag pak-shi was once again able to gather some good amount of writing materials and sent to Tibet with the requesting to re-inscribe all manuscripts and set in separate volumes. dbu-pa blo-gsal byang-chub ye-shes, who was the disciple of both bcom-ldan rigs-ral and 'jam-gag pak-shi, was entrusted for this new task. He with colleagues, dutifully accomplished the work and published for the first time a complete and new set of volumes of - bka'-'gyur & bstan-'gyur and placed at a temple, 'jam-lha-khang of the snar thang monastery, which later became famous as snar thang edition. Both the catalogues and volumes of this hand-written oldest edition of the bka'-'gyur & bstan-'gyur are no longer available.

=== Catalogues of Buddhist collections in Royal Palaces ===
- lhan dkar ma/ldan dkar ma (found in later Kanjurs)
- 'phang thang ma (recently rediscovered)
- mchims bu ma (lost)

=== Later catalogues ===
- Grags pa rgyal mtshan (1147–1216)
- Bcom ldan rig dral (13th century)
- 'Phags pa blo gros rgyal mtshan (1235–1280)

The Tibetan part of the Chinese tripitaka Zhonghua da zang jing (中華大藏經) was published in 2008.

=== Kangyur versions ===
- Old Narthang Kangyur (thought to have been a ms collection with multiple copies of texts) Not surviving. The versions Yongle (永乐版), Wangli (万历版), Lithang (理塘版/丽江版), Kangxi (康熙版/北京版), Zhuoli (卓尼版), Derge (德格版), Narthang (那塘版), Urga (拉加版), Kulun (库仑版), Lhasa (拉萨版), Wala (瓦拉版) and Chamdo (昌都版) are in printed forms.

=== Tshal-pa Lineage ===
These are all woodcut editions:

- Yongle Kanjur (1410) (largely lost)
- Wanli Kanjur (1606) (largely lost, but available via 1680 Berlin ms copy)
- Lithang Kanjur (1608–1621)
- Kangxi Kanjur (1684–1692) (with several corrected reprints)
- Cone Kanjur (1721–1731)
- Narthang (1730–1732) (with contamination from Them-spangs-ma line)
- Derge Kanjur (1733) (with contamination from Them-spangs-ma line)
- Qianlong Kanjur (1737)
- Urga Kanjur (with multiple contaminations)
- Lhasa Kanjur (with multiple contaminations)

=== Them-spangs-ma Lineage ===
These are all manuscript editions:

- Shel-dkar (available via London ms copy 1712)
- Tokyo Ms Kanjur (1858–1878)
- sTog Palace Kanjur manuscript (c. 1700–1750)
- Ulan Batur Ms Kanjur

=== Local Kangyurs ===
- Bathang Kangyur ms
- Mustang Kangyur ms
- Phug-drak Kangyur ms (1696–1706)
- Tabo Ms Fragments (individual texts, not apparently a complete Kanjur)
- Tawang Kangyurs (two copies extant)

=== Proto Kangyurs ===
- Gondhla
- Tholing
- Tabo
- Phukthar

=== Mongolian version ===
- Collection of Buddhist Texts in Mongolia - MPIWG Berlin
- Mongolia Preservation Challenges Confront Trove of Buddhist Texts - Eurasianet
- Organisation Selection Natalia Yampolskaya, Canonicity in translation: the Mongolian versions of the "Perfection of Wisdom in 8,000 lines" sutra.]
- Natalia Yampolskaya, Buddhist Scriptures in 17th Century Mongolia: Eight Translations of the Aṣṭasāhasrikā Prajñāpāramitā, ASIA 2015; 69(3): 747–772
- Christopher P. Atwood, Buddhism and Popular Ritual in Mongolian Religion: A Reexamination of the Fire Cult, Department of East Asian Languages and Civilizations, 12: History of Religions, 1969, 112–139.

=== Sigla ===
The following sigla are regularly used in scholarly editions of Kanjur texts.

- Tshal pa group
  - B Berlin Kanjur
  - C Cone Kanjur
  - D Derge Kanjur
  - J Lithang Kanjur
  - Q Peking Kanjur
  - R Ragya Kanjur
  - U Urga Kanjur
- Them spangs ma group
  - L London Kanjur
  - S Stog Kanjur
  - T Tokyo Kanjur
  - V Ulaanbaatar Kanjur
  - Z Shey Kanjur

== Tengyur ==
- Derge
- Cone
- Narthang
- Peking
- Golden

=== Publication and issues of the Tibetan Buddhist canon ===
A number of catalogues have been published.

- Beckh, Hermann (1914). Verzeichnis der Tibetischen Handschriften der Königlichen Bibliothek zu Berlin. Berlin: Behrend.
- Bethlenfalvy, Geza (1980). A Catalogue of the Urga Kanjur in the Prof. Raghuvira Collection. New York: Institute for Advanced Studies of World Religions.
- Chandra, Lokesh (1983). Catalogue of the Lhasa Kanjur. New Delhi: International Academy of Indian Culture.
- Chandra, Lokesh (1983). Catalogue of the Narthang Kanjur. New Delhi: International Academy of Indian Culture.
- Eimer, Helmut (1992). Location List for the Texts in the Microfiche Edition of the Phug Brag Kanjur: Compiled from the Microfiche Edition and Jampa Samten's Descriptive Catalogue. Tokyo: International Institute for Buddhist Studies.
- Eimer, Helmut (1999). The Early Mustang Catalogue. Vienna: Arbeitskreis für Tibetische und Buddhistische Studien Universität Wien.
- Eimer, Helmut (2012). A Catalogue of the Kanjur Fragment from Bathang Kept in the Newark Museum. Vienna: Arbeitskreis Für Tibetische und Buddhistische Studien Universität Wien.
- Imaeda, Yoshiro 今枝由郎 (1982/1984). Catalogue du Kanjur Tibetain de l'Edition de 'Jang sa-tham (2 vols). Tokyo: International Institute for Buddhist Studies.
- Members of Staff, Indo-Tibetan Section of the Indologisches Seminar, Universität Bonn (1998). The Brief Catalogues to the Narthang and the Lhasa Kanjurs. Vienna: Arbeitskreis Für Tibetische und Buddhistische Studien Universität Wien.
- Pagel, Ulrich and Gaffney, Säan (1996). Location List to the Texts in the Microfiche Edition of the ‘Sel Dkar (London) Manuscript Bka’ ‘gyur. London: British Library.
- Samten, Jampa, Niisaku, Hiroaki 新作博明 and Tahuwa, Kelsang (2012). Catalogue of the Ulan Bator Rgyal Rtse Them Spangs Ma Manuscript Kangyur. Tokyo: Sankibo Press.
- Skorupski, Tadeusz (1985). A Catalogue of the Stog Palace Kanjur. Tokyo: International Institute for Buddhist Studies.
- Tauscher, Helmut (2008). Catalogue of the Gondhla Proto- Kanjur. Vienna: Universität Wien.
- Tohoku University (1934). A Complete Catalogue of the Tibetan Buddhist Canons, Sde-dge Edition, Tohoku University.
- Viehbeck, Markus, and Lainé, Bruno (2022). The Manuscript Kanjur from Shey Palace, Ladakh: Introduction and Catalogue. Vienna: Arbeitskreis für Tibetische und Buddhistische Studien Universität Wien.

== Non-collected works ==
- Dunhuang Tibetan manuscripts
- Dongcang canon (东仓五百部)
- Nyingma Gyubum
- the Treasury of Precious Termas (rin chen gter mdzod) or Rinchen Terdzö (舊譯十萬續部集) is a collection of secret Nyingma buddhism texts gathered under Rime movement published in 63 volumes by Dilgo Khyentse Rinpoche, New Delhi, India, with the addition of several more volumes of termas and commentaries. It has since been online at Tsadra Foundation and Lotsawa House's websites.
- Dudjom Tersar (not included into Rinchen Terdzö)
- Bon Kangyur

== Generic classification of canonical texts ==
=== Exoteric or Sutra tradition ===
In the Tibetan tradition, some collections of teachings and practices are held in greater secrecy than others. The sutra tradition comprises works said to be derived from the public teachings of the Buddha, and is taught widely and publicly. The esoteric tradition of tantra (below) is generally only shared in more intimate settings with those students who the teacher feels have the capacity to utilize it well.

=== Esoteric or Tantra tradition ===
==== Tantra categorization by the Ancient Translation School ====
The collection of the tantras of the Nyingma is known as the Nyingma Gyubum. The division used by the Nyingma or Ancient school:

- Three Outer Tantras:
  - Kriyayoga
  - Charyayoga
  - Yogatantra
- Three Inner Tantras, which correspond to the Anuttarayogatantra:
  - Mahayoga
  - Anuyoga
  - Atiyoga (Tib. Dzogchen), further divided into three classes:
    - Mental Semde
    - Spatial Longdé
    - Esoteric Instructional Mengagde

==== Tantra categorization by the New Translation School ====
The Sarma or New Translation schools of Tibetan Buddhism (Gelug, Sakya, and Kagyu) divide the Tantras into four hierarchical categories, namely,

- Kriyayoga
- Charyayoga
- Yogatantra
- Anuttarayogatantra
  - further divided into "mother", "father" and "non-dual" tantras.

===== Mother Tantra =====
"The Yoginī Tantras correspond to what later Tibetan commentators termed the "Mother Tantras" (ma rgyud)" (CST, p. 5).

===== Father Tantra =====
In the earlier scheme of classification, the "class ... "Yoga Tantras," ... includes tantras such as the Guhyasamāja", later "classified as "Father Tantras" (pha rgyud) ... placed in the ultimate class ... "Unexcelled Yoga tanras" (rnal 'byor bla med kyi rgyud)" (CST, p. 5).

===== Nondual Tantra or Advaya Class =====
- Manjushri-nama-samgiti
- Kalachakra Laghutantra

== Authors of the Canon ==
In addition to texts attributed to Shakyamuni Buddha and other Buddhas, the Tibetan Buddhist canon (specifically the Tenjur) contains a number of commentaries composed by Indian authors. Below are the authors the tradition holds to be of paramount importance.

=== Important Indian scholars ===
==== Two Supremes ====
- Asanga, founder of the Yogacara philosophical school
- Nagarjuna, founder of the Madhyamaka philosophical school

==== Six Scholarly Ornaments ====
- Aryadeva, foremost disciple of Nagarjuna who continued his Madhyamaka philosophical school
- Dharmakirti, famed logician, author of the Seven Treatises; student of Dignāga's student Iśvarasena; said to have debated famed Hindu scholar Adi Shankara
- Dignāga, famed logician
- Vasubandhu, Asanga's brother
- Gunaprabha, foremost student of Vasubandhu, known for his work the Vinayasutra
- Sakyaprabha, prominent exponent of the Vinaya

==== Seventeen Great Panditas ====
References are sometimes made to the Seventeen Great Panditas. This formulation groups the eight listed above with the following nine scholars.

- Atiśa, holder of the lojong teachings
- Bhāviveka, early expositor of the Svātantrika interpretation of Madhyamaka
- Buddhapālita, early expositor of the Prasaṅgika interpretation of Madhyamaka
- Candrakīrti, considered the greatest exponent of the Prasaṅgika interpretation
- Haribhadra, commentator on Asanga's Ornament of Clear Realization
- Kamalaśīla, 8th-century author of important texts on meditation
- Śāntarakṣita, abbot of Nalanda, founder of the Yogācāra-Svatantrika-Mādhyamaka interpretation who reputedly helped Padmasambhava establish Buddhism in Tibet
- Shantideva, 8th-century Indian author of the Bodhisattvacaryāvatāra
- Vimuktisena, commentator on Asanga's Ornament of Clear Realization

== Five traditional topics of study ==
Study of the Tibetan Buddhist canon is a focal point of the monastic curriculum. All four schools of Tibetan Buddhism generally follow a similar curriculum, using the same Indian root texts and commentaries. The further Tibetan commentaries they use differ by school, although since the 19th-century appearance of the Rimé movement scholars Jamgon Kongtrul, Jamgon Ju Mipham Gyatso and Khenpo Shenga, Kagyupas and Nyingmapas use many of the same Tibetan commentaries as well. Different schools, however, place emphasis and concentrate attention on different areas.

The exoteric study of Buddhism is generally organized into "Five Topics," listed as follows with the primary Indian source texts for each:

1. Abhidharma
  - Asanga's Abhidharma-samuccaya
  - Vasubandhu's Abhidharma-kośa
2. Prajnaparamita
  - Abhisamayalankara
  - Shantideva's Bodhisattvacaryāvatāra
3. Madhyamaka
  - Nagarjuna's Mūlamadhyamakakārikā
  - Four Hundred Verses on the Yogic Deeds of Bodhisattvas (Catuhsataka) by Aryadeva
  - Candrakīrti's Madhyamakāvatāra
  - Śāntarakṣita's Madhyamākalaṃkāra
  - Shantideva's Bodhisattvacaryāvatāra
4. Pramana
  - Dharmakirti's Pramāṇavarttika
  - Dignāga's Pramāṇa-samuccaya
5. Vinaya
  - Gunaprabha's Vinayamula Sutra

=== Five treatises attributed to Maitreya ===
Also of great importance are the "Five Treatises of Maitreya." These texts are said to have been taught to Asanga by Maitreya (according to the Buddhist tradition, he is the future Buddha who currently resides in Tushita-Heaven; some scholars, for example, Frauwallner and Tucci believe Maitreya was a historical person who had to be Asangas teacher), and comprise the heart of the Shentong-Madhyamaka, as well as Yogacara school of philosophical thought in which all Tibetan Buddhist scholars are well-versed. They are as follows:

- Abhisamayalankara
- Mahayanasutralankara
- Ratnagotravibhāga
- Dharmadharmatavibhanga
- Madhyantavibhanga

A commentary on the Ornament for Clear Realization called Clarifying the Meaning by the Indian scholar Haribhadra is often used, as is one by Vimuktisena.

== See also ==
- Chinese Buddhist canon
- Sanskrit Buddhist literature
- Karchag Phangthangma, imperial catalogue
- Sutra
- Pali Canon
- Tripitaka Koreana
- Tripitaka
