= Chandragomin =

Indian Buddhist lay scholar and poet

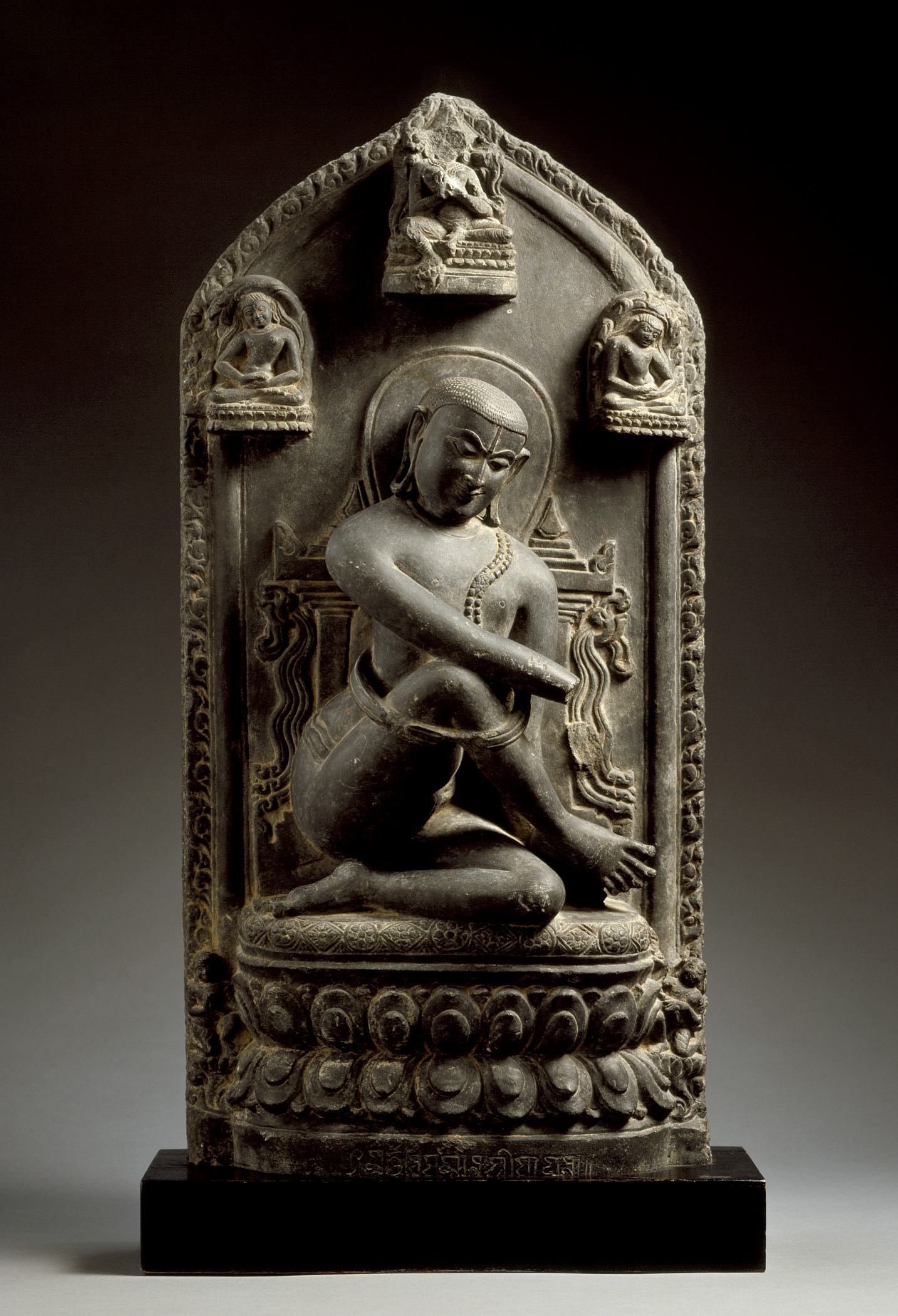
Mahasiddha Chandragomin, Black Schist, Bangladesh, 12th century

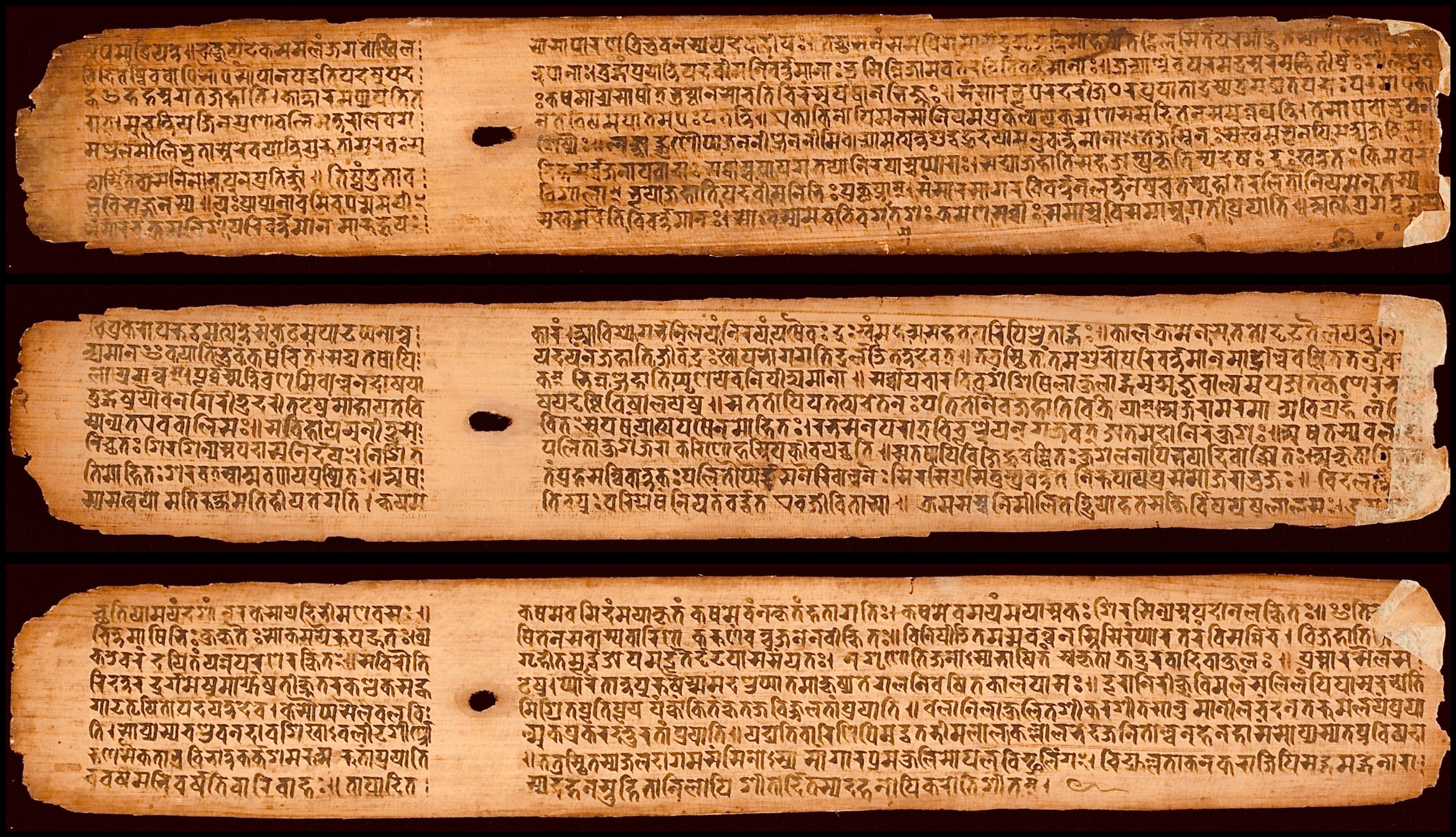
An 11th-century Shisyalekha manuscript, originally authored in 5th-century CE by Chandragomin. It is a Buddhist Sanskrit text in the Devanagari script discovered in Nepal. Chandragomin's composition is an ornate epistolary genre Buddhist poetry about a monk who falls in love and breaks his celibacy vow.

Chandragomin (Skt. Candragomin) was an Indian Buddhist lay scholar and poet. The Tibetan tradition believes he challenged Chandrakirti. Chandragomin was a teacher at Nalanda Monastic University during the 5th century.

== Life ==
It is unclear when Chandragomin lived, with estimates ranging between 5th to 6th-century CE, but his position at Nalanda signifies he lived during the 5th century. Taranatha states that Chandragomin was from the Varendra region of Eastern Bengal however in the prologue of his composition, the Lokānanda, Chandragomin merely states that he was “born in the Jātukarṇa lineage in the east of India". He further states that he was the son of a Jayādevi although he doesn't add anything further to this.

The Tibetan tradition details many stories of miraculous incidents that occurred in Chandragomin's life. In one story told by Taranatha, it was said that Chandragomin defeated a Charvaka by proving the doctrine of rebirth to be true:

In order to prove the doctrine of rebirth, Candragomin fixed on the middle of his forehead a mark of vermillion which entered deep into the flesh, placed a pearl in his mouth and died instantly. His corpse was put in a sealed copper vessel. In accordance with his prophecy he was reborn as the son of a Paṇḍita Viśeṣaka among the Kṣatriyas. Immediately after his birth a mark of vermillion came to light on his forehead and a pearl appeared in his mouth. The corpse in the vessel was examined, but the mark and the pearl had disappeared, which convinced the Lokāyata teacher that the doctrine of rebirth is true.

The hagiographical and legendary tales however cannot be taken as historical fact. Different writers also attempted to fit Chandragomin within their narratives for example Taranatha wanted to depict Chandragomin as someone who is learned and cultured while Buton Rinchen Drub emphasised his work on grammar.

== Major works ==
Candragomin was one of the most important Buddhist poets of India. He wrote a play called Lokānanda, which focuses on the bodhisattva king Manicūda. This is the oldest Sanskrit Buddhist play in existence and was quite popular in India.

Chadragomin's other surviving Sanskrit writings include:

- Letter to a Disciple (Śiṣyalekha) - published by Dharma Publishing as 'Invitation to Enlightenment' ISBN 0-89800-298-2)
- Twenty Verses on the Bodhisattva Percepts (Bodhisattvasaṃvaraviṃśaka).
- Confessional Praise (Deśanāstava)

Candragomin was also a devotee of Tara and composed several praises of the goddess, whilst in Chandradwip (present-day Barisal Division, Bangladesh).

Translated from the original Buddhist Hybrid Sanskrit into Tibetan is Chandragomin's 'Shurangama Mantra Sadhana (Tibetan canon Tengyur Karchag Phangthangma Toh 3096, Toh 593/2/1). It is titled Sarvatathāgataoṣṇīṣaśitātapatrā-nāmāparājitā-mahāpratyangirā-mahāvidyārājñī-nāma-dhāraṇī; Tibetan name is ['phags pa] De bshin gshegs pa'i gtsug tor nas byung ba'i gdugs dkar po can gshan gyi mi thub pa phir bzlog pa chen mo mchog tu grub pa shes bya ba'i gzungs.

== See also ==
- Chandrakirti
- Nagarjuna
- Shurangama Mantra
