= Vairotsana =

Lotsawa living during the reign of King Trisong Detsen

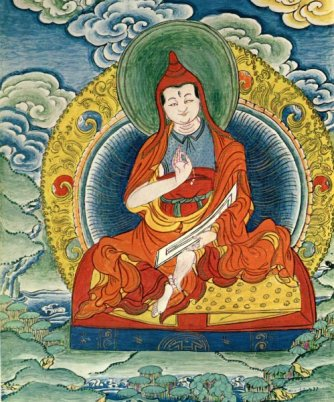

Vairotsana (Tibetan: བཻ་རོ་ཙ་ན་, Wylie: ba gor bai ro tsa na) was a lotsawa or "translator" living during the reign of King Trisong Detsen, who ruled 755-97 CE. Vairotsana, one of the 25 main disciples of Padmasambhava, was recognized by the latter as a reincarnation of an Indian pandita. He was among the first seven monks ordained by Śāntarakṣita, and was sent to Dhahena in India to study with Śrī Siṅgha, who taught him in complete secrecy. Śrī Siṅgha in turn entrusted Vairotsana with the task of propagating the semde and longdé sections of Dzogchen in Tibet. He is one of the three main masters to bring the Dzogchen teachings to Tibet, the two others being Padmasambhava and Vimalamitra, and was also a significant lineage holder of trul khor.

Shechen Gyaltsab mentions in his Pond of White Lotus Flowers that before meeting Śrī Siṅgha, Vairotsana had met the wisdom forms of the two vidyadharas Garab Dorje and Mañjuśrīmitra in a miraculous pagoda at Dhahena. After he had presented a huge offering of gold, they conferred empowerment upon him and bestowed their blessings, with the prediction that he would receive the complete teachings from Shri Singha.

He is named after Vairocana, the central dhyani Buddha.

== Disciples ==
Vairotsana's chief disciples were Yudra Nyingpo, Sangtön Yeshe Lama, Pang Gen Sangye Gönpo, Jnana Kumara of Nyag (Wylie: nyag ye she gzhon nu), and Lady Yeshe Drönma (Wylie: jo mo ye shes sgron). An especially renowned disciple was the old Pang Gen Mipham Gönpo whose disciples attained the rainbow body for seven generations by means of the oral instructions of Longdé entitled 'Dorje Zampa' (Wylie: rdo rje zam pa) also known as the 'Vajra Bridge'. Tsele Natsok Rangdröl, Terdag Lingpa Gyurmey Dorje, and Jamgon Kongtrul are regarded as reincarnations of Vairotsana.

== Travels ==
Born in Pagor, (Note: Another source says Vairotsana was born in Nyêmo Chekar near Uyuk in Nyêmo County.) Vairotsana was sent to India by Trisong Detsen to learn the Dharma with Indian panditas. Vairotsana also travelled widely in China, Khotan, Nepal, Zhangzhung, amongst other places. In China, Vairotsana received teachings from nineteen teachers. Amongst these were: Kusula Bhitigarbha, Dharmabodhi, Vajra Sukha Deva, Pandita Barma, Tsenda Ritropa, Mahabodhi, Shri Ani, Moheyan, Surya Ghirti and Satipa.

== Publications ==
- Eye of the Storm: Vairotsana's Five Original Transmissions (Snga 'gyur lnga)—translation and commentary by Keith Dowman; Vajra Publications, Nepal.
