= Neither one nor many =

Neither one nor many is a spiritual and philosophical argument that truly existing entities are not merely singular (since they always comprise multiple parts), nor are they plural (since a plural is simply an abstract grouping of already-debunked singular entities); therefore reality or existence is neither singular nor plural in its composition. The argument is employed by different philosophers and spiritual traditions for various reasons. Its formulation, permutations, and antecedents, particularly the "problem of the One and the Many" as charted by philologist Thomas McEvilley (2002: pp. 23–66), has an ancient pedigree in the lineages of both Indian philosophy (namely, Buddhist philosophy) and Greek philosophy. McEvilley (2002) also provides arguments inferring the mutual influence and mutual iteration of the ancient Indian and Greek philosophical traditions.

In its Buddhist usage, the argument is one of a suite of arguments within the purview of Pramana and Indian logic to demonstrate and test various doctrines. The argument is a factor in the algorithmic function of the Buddhist logical system of Catuskoti. Different authorities and sources provide different enumerations of these said arguments. One exploration of the Madhyamākalaṃkāra of Śāntarakṣita in Buddhist literature conveys its uniqueness in its focused, dedicated, and protracted usage of the "neither one nor many" argument:

The Madhyamakalankara invokes the argument of "neither one nor many" more intensively (throughout sixty-two of its ninety-seven stanzas) than any other text in Buddhist literature. This argument is one of a series of proofs used to demonstrate that phenomena are without real existence.
