= Changlei Monastery =

Religious site in Tibet

- Chinese transcription(s); Traditional: 昌列寺; Simplified: 昌列寺; Pinyin: Chānglièsì
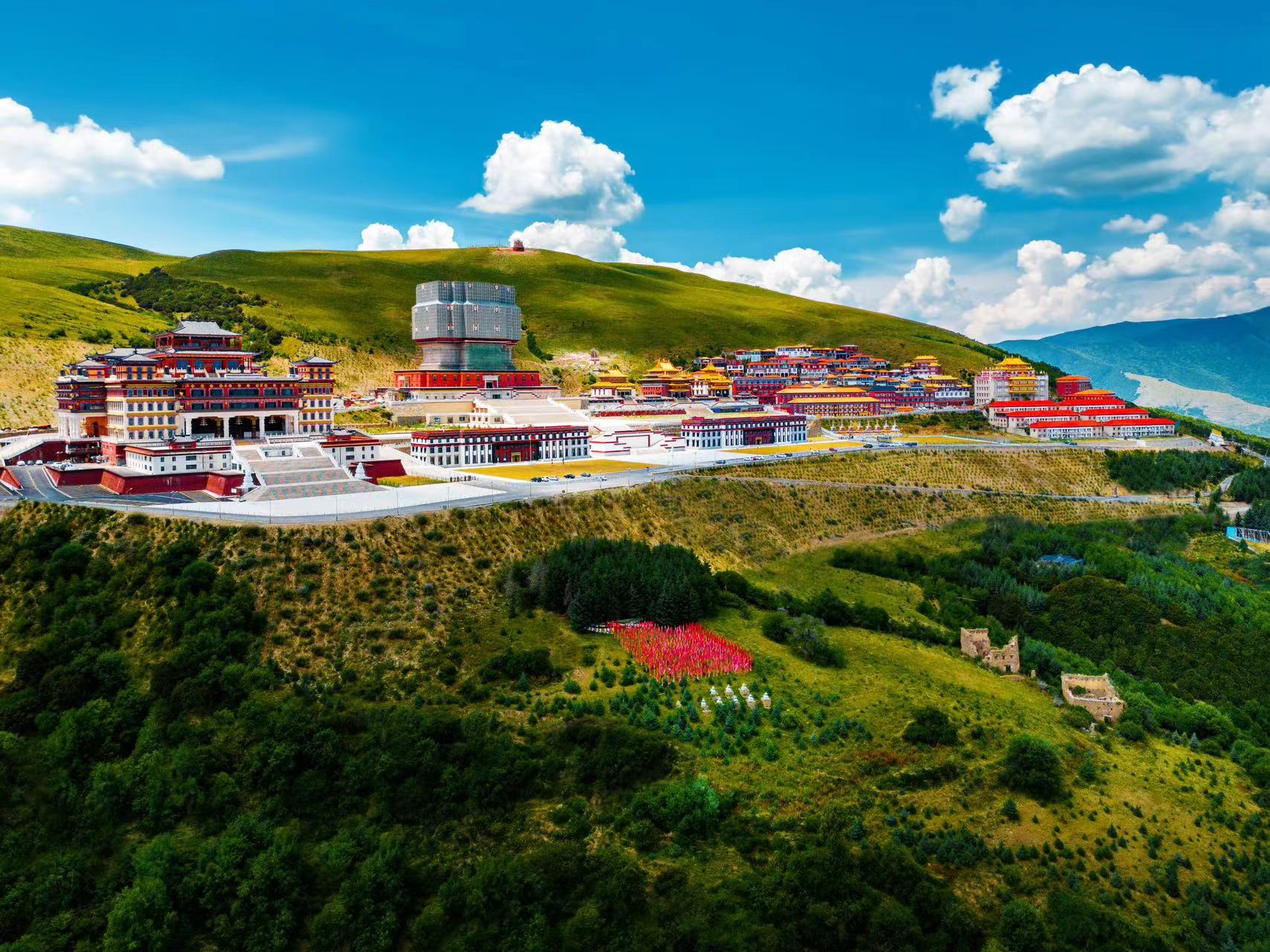
- Panorama of Changlei Monastery

- Location within China

Religion
- Affiliation: Tibetan Buddhism
- Sect: Nyingma
- Leadership: Karma Rinpoche

Location
- Location: Barkam, Ngawa, Sichuan
- Country: China
- Coordinates: 31°54′28″N 102°09′36″E

Architecture
- Style: Tibetan Buddhist monastery
- Founder: Shire Jangtsen (The reincarnation of Yudra Nyingpo)
- Established: 12th century CE

Website
- http://www.changleisi.com/

Changlei Holy Mountain is located in Yingbolo of Barkam. The surrounding terrain forms a bowl-shaped highland valley. The 83-hectare monastic complex is situated near the center of this area.

According to traditional accounts, in the 8th century CE, the master Vairotsana and the yogi Yudra Nyingpo resided in this region and transmitted Dharma teachings.

Around the 12th century CE, the reincarnation of Yudra Nyingpo — Shire Jangtsen — built a retreat hut on Mount Yingbolo, which later developed into a small monastery. This is regarded as the origin of Changlei Monastery.

Between 1966 and 1976, Changlei Monastery was destroyed during the Cultural Revolution, leaving only partial ruins.

After 1980, under the leadership of Tulku Yanban Shire Jangtsen (Karma Rinpoche), rebuilding efforts began, leading to the establishment of the present monastery complex.

The Small Scripture Hall of Changlei Monastery was designated as a provincial-level cultural relic protection unit (the eighth batch) in Sichuan in 2012.

== Location ==
Changlei Monastery is located on Changlei Holy Mountain in Ngawa Prefecture, Barkam City, Sichuan Province, China.

=== 1. Administrative Division ===
The monastery is under the jurisdiction of Barkam City. It is one of several Nyingma monasteries in the region.

=== 2. Physical Geography ===
- Located at an elevation of about 3,500 meters on the slopes of Changlei Mountain, overlooking Barkam City and the Suomo River Gorge.
- Situated on the eastern edge of the Qinghai–Tibet Plateau, characterized by alpine terrain, a cold and humid climate, and seasonal vegetation changes.

=== 3. Transportation ===
- Approximately 480 km from Chengdu via expressway through Wenchuan.
- Around 16 km (roughly 30 minutes by car) from downtown Barkam.
- Barkam serves as a local transportation hub with routes to nearby counties.

== Architecture ==
Changlei Monastery's layout follows the mountain slope, with structures arranged across multiple terraces. The complex includes temples, a Buddhist institute, a retreat area, and a museum.

Main facilities include:

- Old Monastery
- Avalokiteśvara Hall
- Śākyamuni Hall
- Buddhist Institute
- Retreat Center
- Changlei Museum
- Grand Hall Library

== Teachers and Lamas ==
Changlei Monastery hosts over 500 resident monks. Principal teachers include:

- Karma Rinpoche (Yanban Shire Jangtsen)
- Khenchen Gongsang Rinpoche
- Khenpo Agen

== Dharma Teachings ==
The monastery regularly offers Dharma lectures, retreats, and annual prayer ceremonies. Teachings are published on its official website and related platforms. Topics include:

- Mind cultivation practices
- Preliminary practices of Dzogchen
- Application of Buddhist teachings in daily life
- Live-streamed ceremonies and Q&A sessions
- Annual festivals

Recordings and written materials are also compiled for practitioners.

Additional interviews and teachings by Karma Rinpoche are available on external Dharma platforms.

== Dharma Activities ==
Annual ceremonies at Changlei Monastery include:

- During Lunar New Year: Phowa empowerment and group practice
- January: Wrathful Guru Rinpoche Puja
- May: Commemoration of the late master Tuden Chokyi Zhaba
- June: Annual celebration of Guru Rinpoche's birthday
- November: Vajrasattva Winter Practice Puja

== Gallery ==
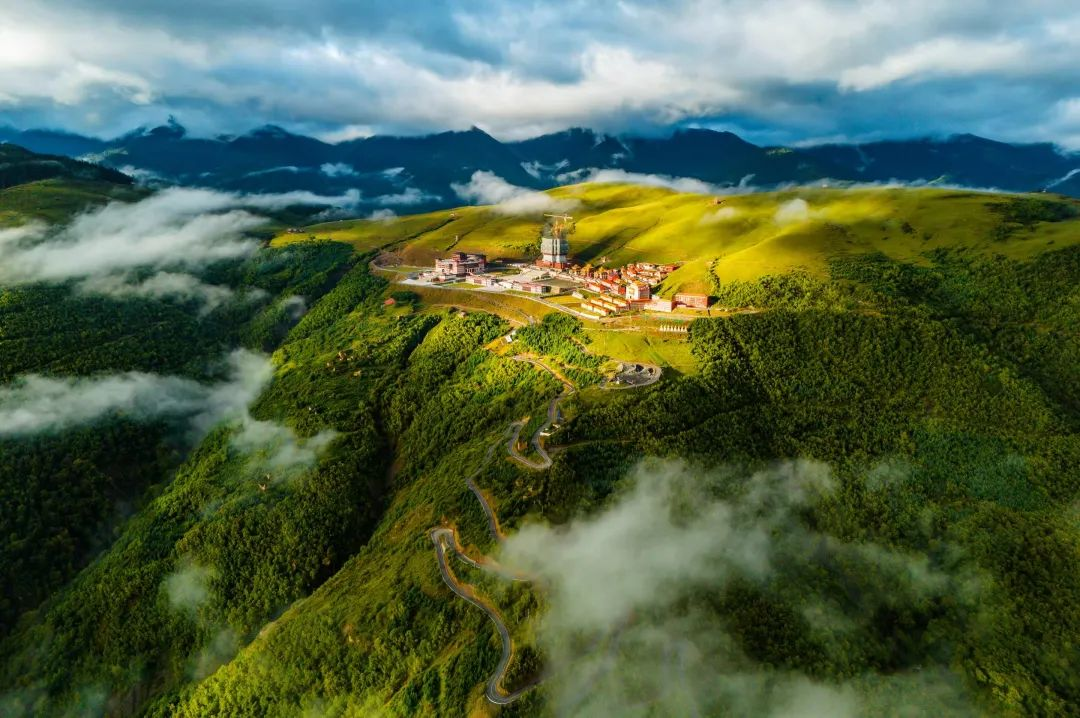
Aerial view of Changlie Monastery, Aba Prefecture, Sichuan.

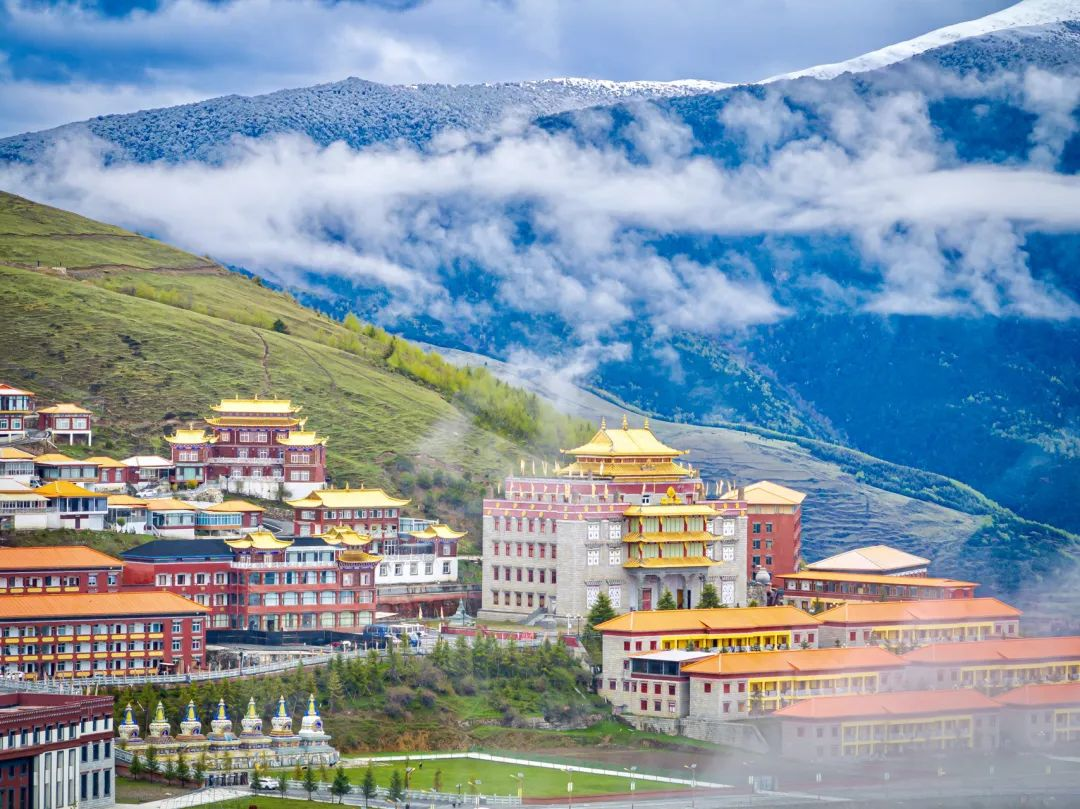
Partial view of Changlie Monastic College, Aba Prefecture, Sichuan

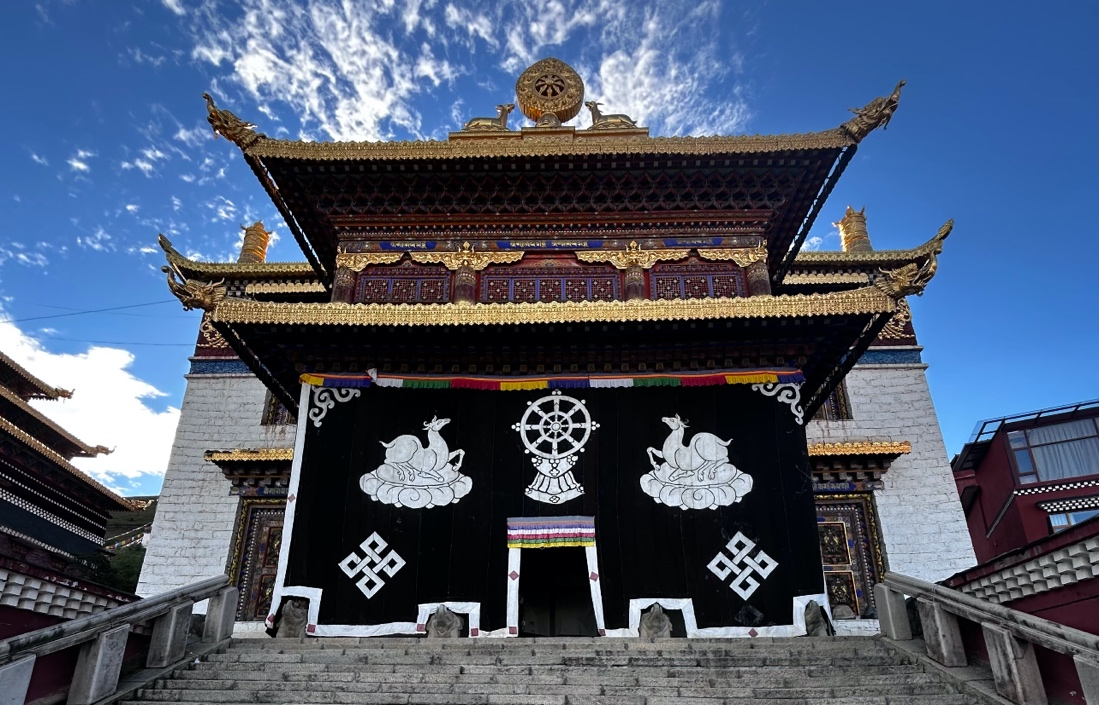
Partial view of the 800-year-old monastery at Changlie Monastery

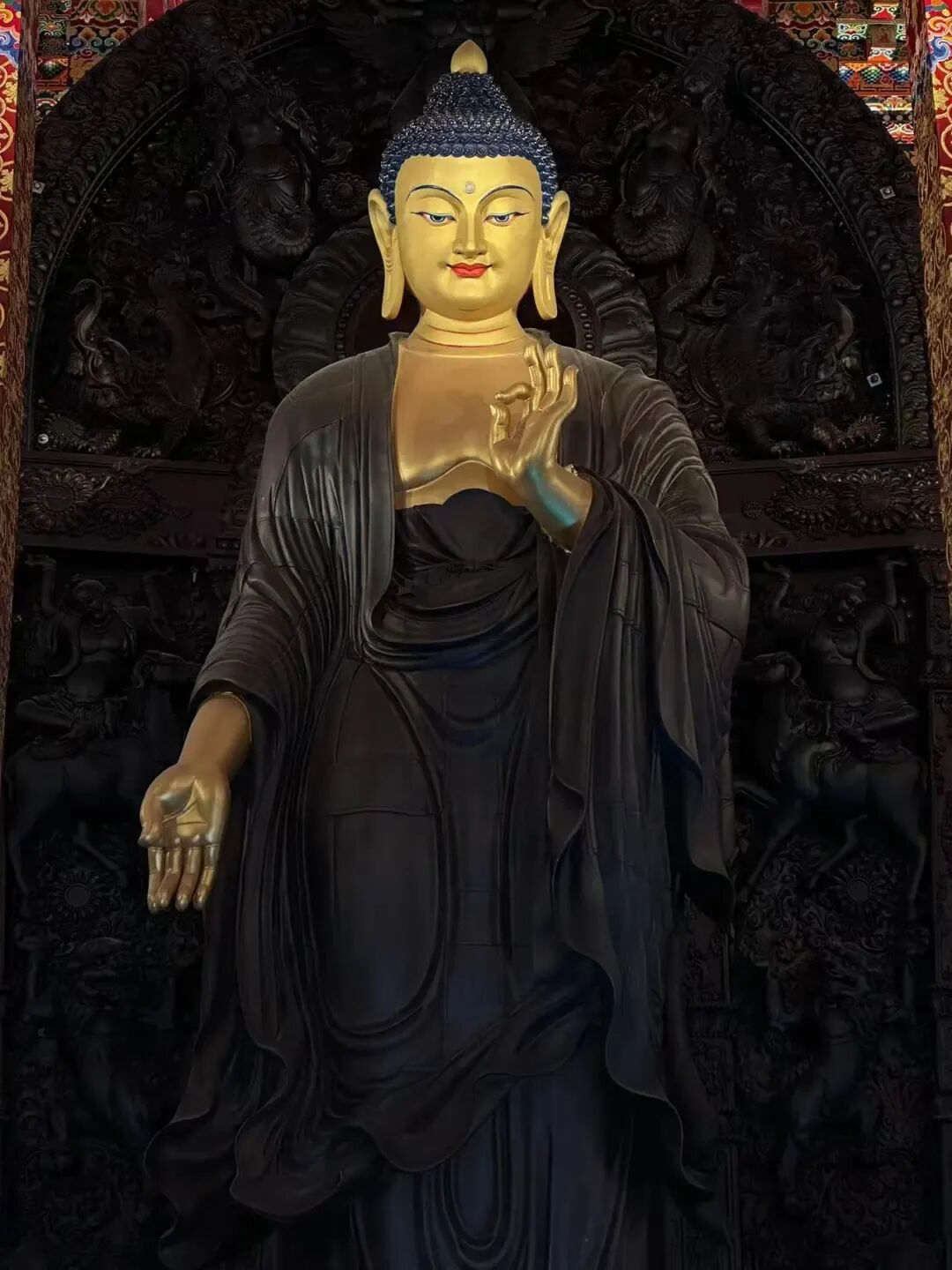
Eye-level view of the Shakyamuni statue

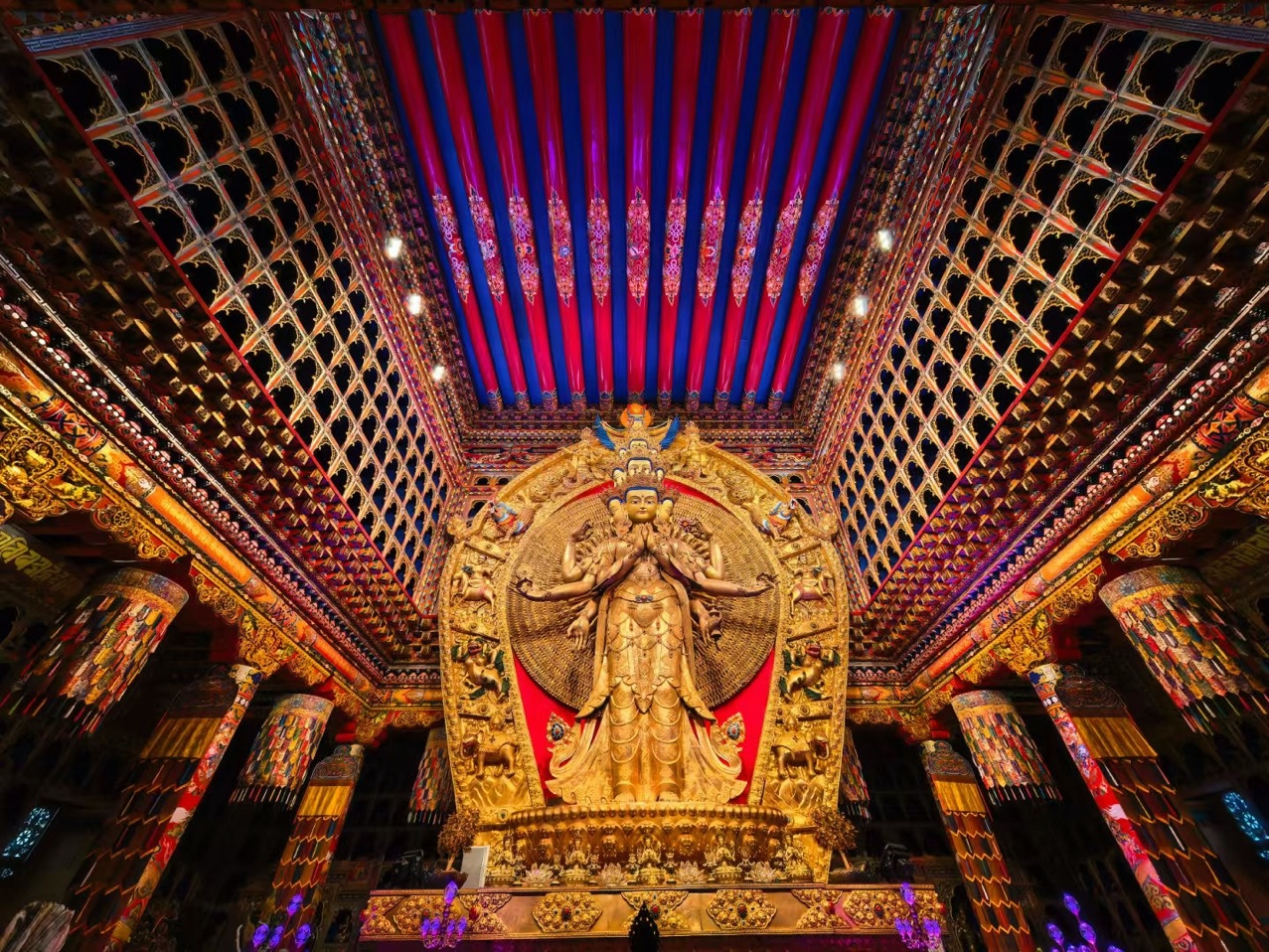
Upward View of the Avalokiteśvara Hall Statue

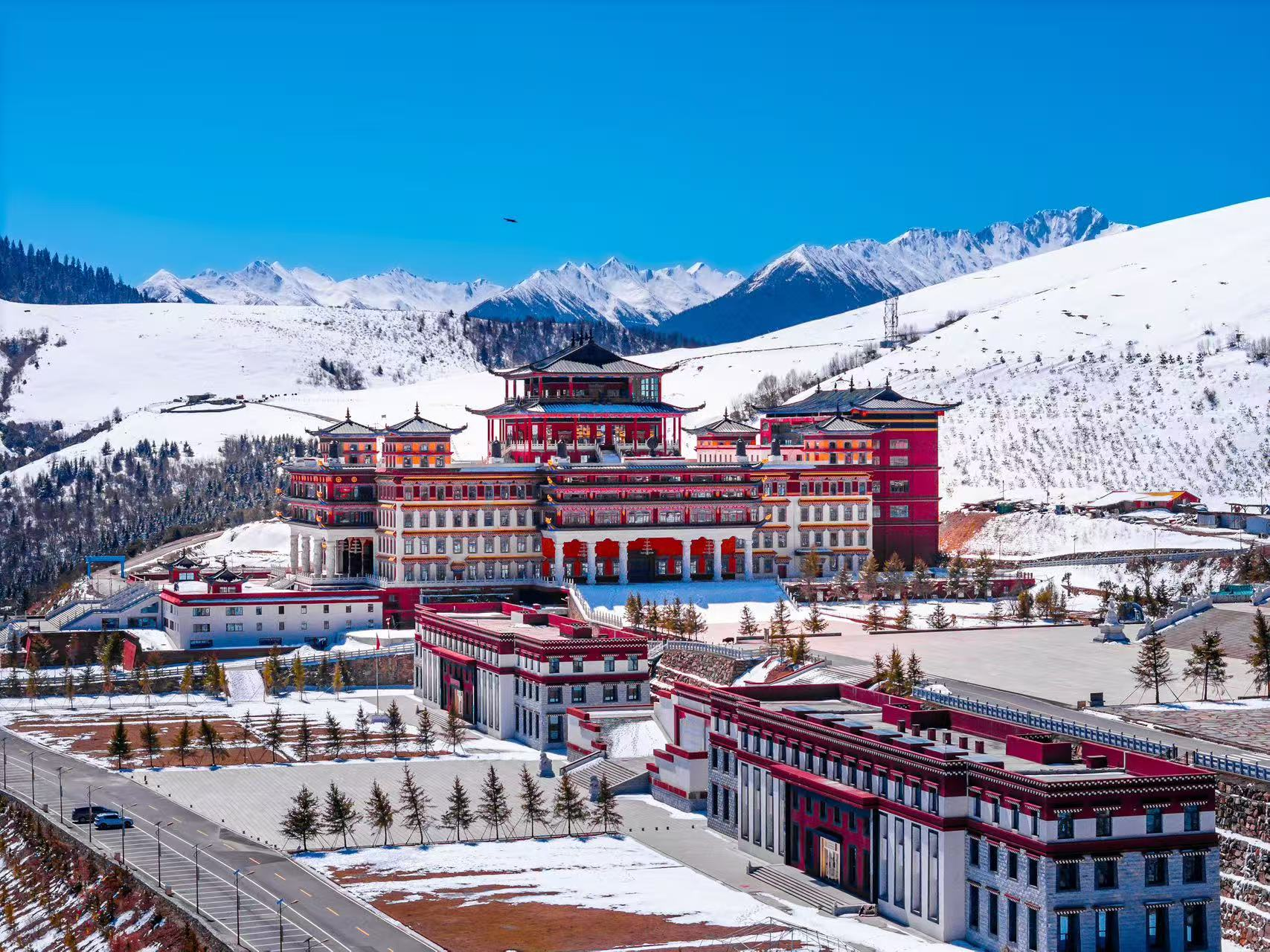
Exterior View of the Grand Sutra Hall, Changlie Monastery

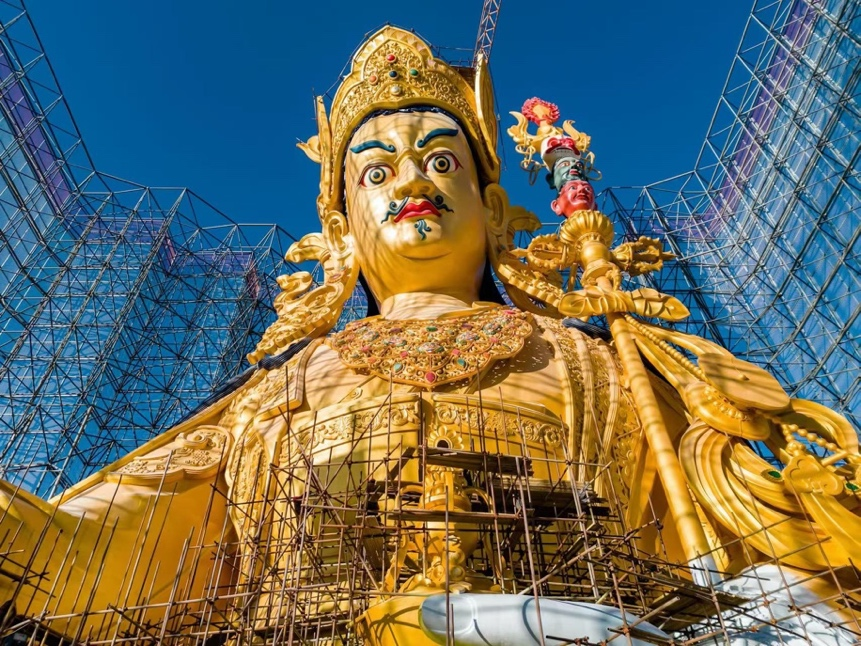
The world's largest Padmasambhava statue under construction

== See also ==
- Karma Rinpoche
- Nyingma
- Tibetan Buddhism
- Yudra Nyingpo
