= Karma Rinpoche =

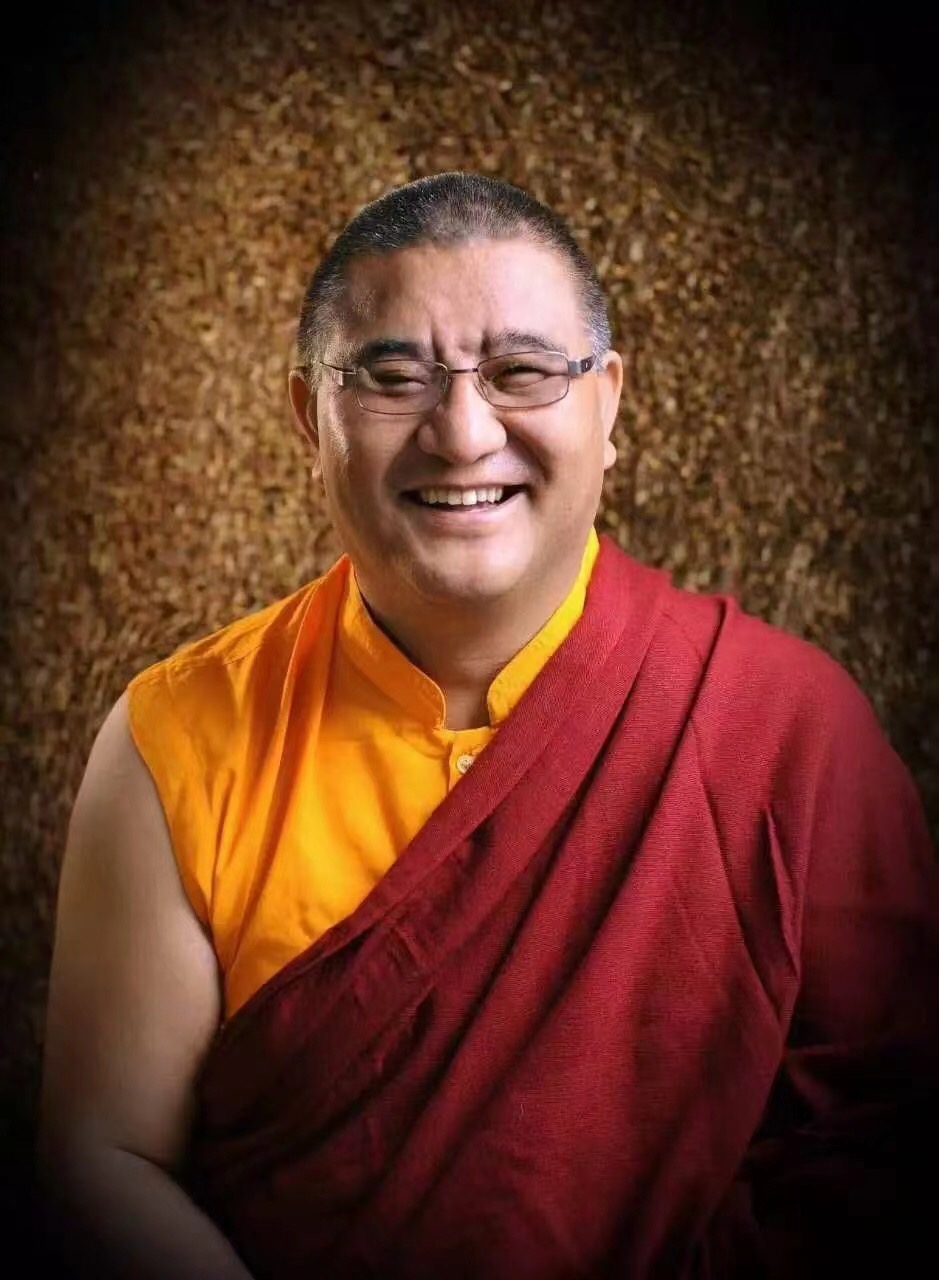
- Tulku Yanban Shire Jangtsen Karma

Personal life
- Born: 1968 (age 57–58) Barkam, Ngawa, Sichuan

Religious life
- Religion: Tibetan Buddhism
- Denomination: Nyingma
- Temple: Changlei Monastery

Senior posting
- Teacher: Trulzhik Chokyi Drakpa
- Reincarnation: Shire Jangtsen (The reincarnation of Yudra Nyingpo)

Karma Rinpoche (Tibetan: ཀརྨ་རིན་པོ་ཆེ་; Chinese: 顏班·希熱將參 嘎瑪) is a Nyingma master of Tibetan Buddhism, born in 1968 in Barkam, Ngawa Prefecture, Sichuan, China. He currently serves as the abbot of Changlei Monastery. From an early age, he began studying Buddhist teachings under the guidance of his maternal uncle, and later received extensive training from the great Khenpo Trulzhik Chokyi Drakpa Rinpoche, eventually earning the title of Khenpo.

Rinpoche played an important role in the establishment of the first exoteric and esoteric Buddhist institute in the Gyarong region, where he also served as its principal. In 1999, he was formally recognized as the 85th throne holder of the Kathog lineage. Dedicated to spreading the Dharma, he teaches at his monastery as well as throughout the Chinese-speaking world, frequently giving lectures and participating in Dharma activities. His publications include Dialogue with the Mind and Using Your Wealth Wisely, among others.

== Reincarnation Lineage ==
The reincarnation lineage of Karma Rinpoche can be traced back to the era of King Trisong Detsen, beginning with his previous incarnation, Zengwan Lezhou. Zengwan Lezhou later reincarnated as Yudra Nyingpo, who became one of Guru Padmasambhava’s twenty-five principal disciples. During the time of the Kathog founder Dampa Deshek, Yudra Nyingpo was reborn as Shire Jangtsen, one of the “Three Accomplished Companions of Gyarong.” The present Karma Rinpoche is regarded as the reincarnation of Shire Jangtsen.

== Dharma activities ==
In recent years, Karma Rinpoche has conducted numerous public teachings, Dharma lectures, and retreat guidance programs across Chinese-speaking regions. He has also supported the formation of Buddhist study groups and practice communities. Information on these activities frequently appears in announcements from Buddhist organizations, monastery websites, or course pages.

Major annual ceremonies at Changlei Monastery (such as the Manjushri Blessing Ceremony) have also been covered by local media.

== Works ==
Karma Rinpoche's writings include themes such as mind training, practical wisdom, and preliminary practices of Dzogchen. In addition to transcribed teachings and audiobooks published on the official website, several of his works have been formally published by bookstores and publishers.

=== Works compiled by Changlei Monastery (official website) ===
The “Teachings of the Masters” page lists several texts, transcripts, and Q&A sessions by Karma Rinpoche, including:

- Words of the Teacher
- Wisdom of Daily Life
- The Wisdom of Clearing Doubts
- Collected Teachings of the Teacher
- Audiobook Series

=== Published Books ===
- Dzogchen Preliminary Practices (Volumes I / II / III).
- Dialogues with the Heart.
- Using Your Fortune Well: A Lama’s Lessons on Life and Prosperity.
- The Source of Happiness.
- Transcending the Ordinary.
- Awakening of Life.

== See also ==
- Changlei Monastery
- Nyingma
- Tibetan Buddhism
- Yudra Nyingpo
