= Yudra Nyingpo =

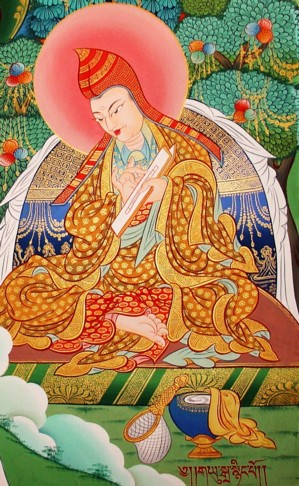
Yudra Nyingpo, was a translator

Yudra Nyingpo (Tibetan: གཡུ་སྒྲ་སྙིང་པོ, Wylie: g.yu sgra snying po) was one of the chief disciples of Vairotsana and one of the principal lotsawa "translators" of the first translation stage of texts into Tibetan.

Yudra Nyingpo became one of the greatest masters of Nyingma Dzogchen Semde and Longdé teachings:

Yudra Nyingpo was a prince of Gyalmo Tsawe Rong (Gyarong) in Eastern Tibet. In Gyarong, Yudra Nyingpo received teachings from Vairocana, who was exiled in the area for a certain period of time. Studying with Vairocana, Yudra Nyingpo became a great scholar and translator. Later he traveled to Central Tibet and received teachings from Guru Rinpoche and he became one of the greatest masters of semde and longdé teachings of Dzogpa Chenpo in Tibet.

Yudra Nyingpo translated many works, including the 'Thirteen Later Translations' (Wylie: phyi 'gyur bcu gsum) of the 'Eighteen Major Scriptural Transmissions of the Mind Series' (Wylie: sems sde lung chen po bco brgyad):

1. Tsemo Chung-gyal (Supreme Peak) (Tibetan: རྩེ་མོ་བྱུང་རྒྱལ, Wylie: rtse mo byung rgyal)
2. Namkha'i Gyalpo (King of Space) (Tibetan: རྣམ་ མཁའི་རྒྱལ་ རྒྱལ་པོ, Wylie: rnam mkha'i rgyal po)
3. Dewa Thrulkod (Jewel-Encrusted Bliss Ornament) (Tibetan: བདེ་བ་འཕྲུལ་བཀོད, Wylie: bde ba 'phrul bkod)
4. Dzogpa Chiching (All-Encompassing Perfection) (Tibetan: རྫོགས་པ་སྤྱི་ཆིངས, Wylie: rdzogs pa spyi chings)
5. Changchub Semtig (Essence of Bodhicitta) (Tibetan: བྱང་ཆུབ་སེམས་ཏིག, Wylie: byang chub sems tig)
6. Dewa Rabjam (Infinite Bliss) (Tibetan: བདེ་བ་རབ་འབྱམས, Wylie: bde ba rab 'byams)
7. Sog-gi Khorlo (Wheel of Life) (Tibetan: སྲོག་གི་འཁོར་ལ, Wylie: srog gi 'khor lo)
8. Thigle Trugpa (Six Spheres) (Wylie: thig le drug pa)
9. Dzogpa Chichod (All-Penetrating Perfection) (Tibetan: རྫོགས་པ་སྤྱི་སྤྱོད, Wylie: rdzogs pa spyi spyod)
10. Yidzhin Norbu (Wish-Fulfilling Jewel) (Tibetan: ཡིད་བཞིན་ནོར་བུ, Wylie: yid bzhin nor bu)
11. Kundu Rigpa (All-unifying Pure Presence) (Tibetan: ཀུན་ཏུ་རིག་པ, Wylie: kun tu rig pa)
12. Jetsun Tampa (Supreme Lord) (Tibetan: རྗེ་བཙན་དམ་པ་, Wylie: rje btsan dam pa)
13. Gonpa Tontrub (The Realization of the True Meaning of Meditation) (Tibetan: སྒོམ་པ་དོན་གྲུབ, Wylie: sgom pa don grub)

Liljenberg (2009: p. 51) holds that there are variances in the listing of the Thirteen Later Translations:

The earliest lists of titles of the Thirteen Later Translations are found in the writings of the twelfth century treasure revealer Nyang Ral Nyi ma 'od zer. He gives two lists, one in his Zangs gling ma biography of Padmasambhava, and the other in his religious history, the Me tog snying po. There are significant differences between the two lists, however, and subsequent lists drawn up by various authors also show marked variations, symptomatic of continuing fluidity in the composition of this group of texts.

== Reincarnation ==
Yudra Nyingpo was the reincarnation of Tsen Wang Lezhou, who had been a fellow student of Vairotsana. After many subsequent incarnations, Yudra Nyingpo was reborn as Shire Jangtsen, one of the “Three Learned Companions of Gyaring.” Following further reincarnations, he is regarded today as having been reborn as Karma Rinpoche, the current abbot of Changlei Monastery in Gyaring (Jiarong), Barkam.

== See also ==
- Padmasambhava
- Vimalamitra
- Trisong Detsen
- Vairotsana
- Nyingma
- Dzogchen
- Changlei Monastery
- Karma Rinpoche
