= Jnanasutra =

There appear to be two Jnanasutras, with different Tibetan orthographies for their names.

The first, Wylie: ye shes mdo, flourished from the 5th-6th centuries. According to Dzogchen legends, he was an early Dzogchen practitioner of Vajrayāna Buddhism and a disciple of Sri Singha. This Jnanasutra was a spiritual brother of Vimalamitra, another principal disciple of Sri Singha.

According to Tarthang Tulku (1980), the second Jnanasutra was the principal lotsawa (Wylie: ye shes sde) of the 8th-9th century of the first wave of translations from Sanskrit to Tibetan.

In Jigme Lingpa's terma of the ngöndro of the Longchen Nyingthig he writes what approximates the phonemic Sanskrit of 'Jnanasutra' in Tibetan script as Tibetan: ཛྙཱ་ན་སཱུ་ཏྲ, Wylie: dznyā na sū tra, rather than his name in Tibetan and this comes just after a sentence to Sri Singha and before mentioning Vimalamitra.

== See also ==
- Menngagde

Texts

- Madhyamākalaṃkāra
