= Karchag Phangthangma =

The Karchag Phangthangma (dkar-chag 'Phang-thang-ma) is one of three historically attested Tibetan imperial catalogues listing translations mainly of Sanskrit Buddhist texts translated to Tibetan. The title, in Tibetan dkar-chag 'phang-thang-ma, simply means the catalogue/index (karchag) from Phangthang (a place in Central Tibet).

The Karchag Phang-tangma (dkar-chag 'Phang-thang-ma) was sponsored by the Tibetan emperors in the 9th century. Studies of the imperial catalogue from Denkar (dkar-chag lDan-dkar-ma) have been conducted by YOSHIMURA (1950); LALOU (1953); and HERRMANN-PFANDT (2008). For studies of the catalogue from 'Phang-thang see: HALKIAS (2004), EISHIN (2005a/2005b), and DOTSON (2007). The Karchag Chimpuma composed in Samye (dkar-chag bSam-yas mChims-phu-ma) has not been found. These imperial catalogues are considered historical documents and prototypes of the Tibetan Buddhist canon.
