= Licchavi =

Licchavi can refer to two historic states in South Asia:

- Licchavis of Vaishali, original branch of the tribe based in Vaishali, Bihar
- Licchavis of Nepal, ruled Nepal beginning in the 4th century CE
