= Madhyamakālaṃkāra =

8th-century Tibetan Buddhist text

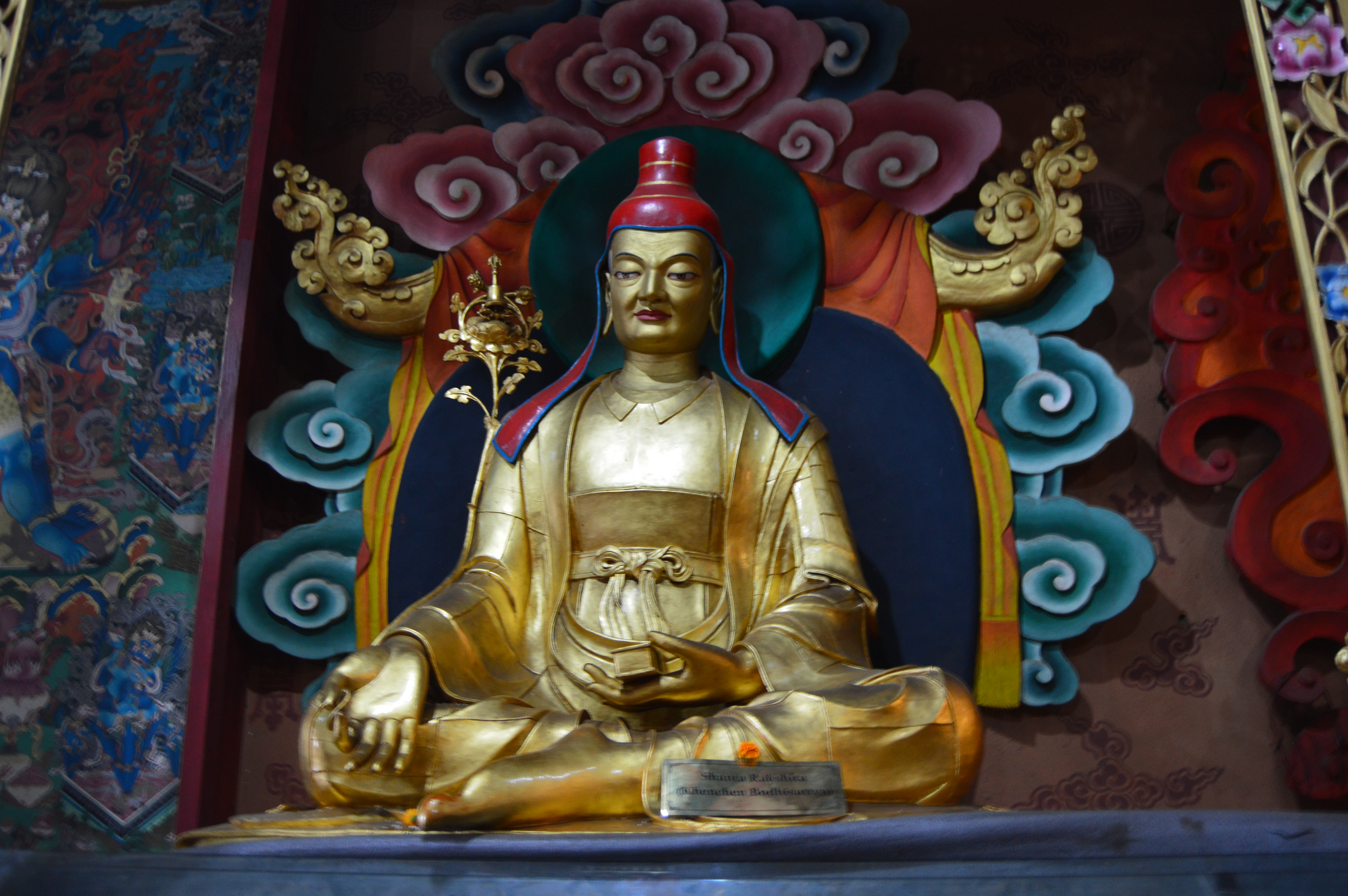
Statue of Śāntarakṣita in Guru Lhakhang Monastery, Bouddhanath, Nepal.

The Madhyamakālaṃkāra (lit. 'Ornament of the Middle Way') is an 8th-century Buddhist text, believed to have been originally composed in Sanskrit by Śāntarakṣita (725–788), which is extant in Tibetan. The Tibetan text was translated from the Sanskrit by Surendrabodhi (Wylie: lha dbang byang chub) and Jñānasūtra.

== Text ==
In the short-verse text of the Madhyamakālaṃkāra, Śāntarakṣita details his philosophical synthesis of the conventional truth of Yogacara with the ultimate truth of the Madhyamaka, assisted by Buddhist logic with a lengthy discussion of the "neither one nor many" argument.

=== Dharmic dialogue ===
Though somewhat lyrical, it is a summary and a key to his encyclopedic Tattvasamgraha. It has the fullness of the Sutrayana and Mahayana traditions' development in its place of origin before the Buddhist tradition of India was transposed by the cultures of the Far East (such as China and Japan) and elsewhere (such as Ceylon and Kashmir), where Buddhism was already flourishing in culturally specific forms. The text refutes challenges of Buddhist systems and tenets from within the tradition, and is a pedagogical discourse on the development of the yana; the philosophical challenges posed by the non-Buddhist religions and non-Dharmic traditions of India, and crystallizes a dialectical sophistication of Indian logic and the clarity of debate expected of a Khenpo of Nalanda Vihara. The text was seminal in the tradition of Samye which became known as a Nyingma institution in contrast to the emergent Sarma traditions of Atisha's (980-1054) translation phase. It documents the Nyingma view of the Two Truths, making it a canonical work. Although the text was marginalized due to the rise of the Prasaṅgika subschool of Mādhyamaka, it was revived by Ju Mipham's (1846–1912) 1876 Commentary.

=== Samye Monastery ===
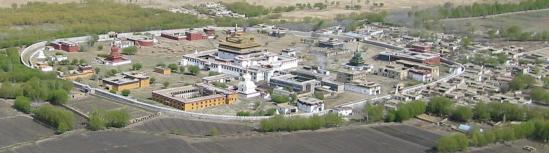
Aerial view of Samye, with its mandala visible

The Madhyamakālaṃkāra and its tradition survived the destruction of Nalanda Vihara and the ascendancy of the Muslim empire in India during the 13th-century eclipse of Buddhism through its transplantation to the Tibetan Plateau by Śāntarakṣita at the request of Trisong Detsen. It was taught at the Samye Monastery, which was safeguarded by the Himalayas.

=== Commentary in English ===
Kennard Lipman (1979) published a study of the Madhyamakālaṃkāra in English. The text and Ju Mipham's commentary are available in studies by Thomas Doctor (2004) and the Padmakara Translation Group (2005). James Blumenthal (2004) also provides a version of the Madhyamālaṃkāra with commentary by Gyaltsab Je (1364–1432).

According to Doctor (2004: p.ix), the Madhyamakālaṃkāra

... is renowned as the principal scripture of the Yogācāramadhyamaka. Although masters such as Ārya Vimuktisena (6th century CE) are said to have set forth their presentations of the Madhyamaka in a way that employs the assertions specific to the Vijñānavāda, Śāntarakṣita was the one to found an actual system in which the ultimate freedom from constructs (Sanskrit niṣprapañca, Tibetan spros bral) is realized through insight into the non-existence of any external matter (bāhyārtha, phyi don). This synthesis of Yogācāra and Madhyamaka, the two great currents of Mahāyāna philosophy, the principles of the vast and the profound as originally set forth by Asaṇga (fl. 4th century) and Nāgārjuna (possibly 150-250 CE) respectively, is also characterized by its use of the pramāṇa methods of Dignāga (5th-6th century) and Dharmakīrti (6th-7th century) as integral steps towards the realization of the ultimate.

Alexander Berzin (2006) translates the title into English as A Filigree of the Middle Way (dBu-ma rgyan, Skt. Madhyamaka-alamkara).

== Logic ==
Indian logic is primarily a study of inferences and their patterns. A pramana is a means of knowledge. Indian logic was influenced by grammar, and Greek (or classical) logic was influenced by mathematics. Vidyabhusana (1921), Randle (1930) and Fyodor Shcherbatskoy (1930) used the terms "Indian logic" and "Buddhist logic".

The Padmakara Translation Group (2005: p. 157) rendered Mipham's advice that Buddhist logic is required to engage the text:

In general, it is important to be familiar with the teachings on probative signs and reasoning and, within that context, the notions of other-elimination, the three conditions of the correct sign, and all the methods of proof or refutation.

According to the doctrine of apoha (gshan-sel-wa in Tibetan), an entity is defined as the negation of its opposite; a cow is not a non-cow.

=== Trairūpya: the three conditions ===
Dignaga formulated three conditions (Sanskrit: trairūpya; Wylie: tshul-gsum) which a logical sign or mark (linga) must fulfill:

1. It should be present in the case or object under consideration (pakṣa)
2. It should be present in a similar case (homologue; sapakṣa)
3. It should not be present in a dissimilar case (heterologue; vipakṣa)

When a linga is identified, there are three possibilities; the sign may be present in all, some or none of the sapakṣas or vipakṣas. Identifying a sign assumes that it is present in the pakṣa, and the first condition is met. Dignaga combined these in his Hetucakra.

== Interpretation ==
The Commentary on Difficult Points (Sanskrit: Madhyamālaṃkāra-panjika, Wylie: dbu ma rgyan gyi dka' 'grel) was written by Kamalaśīla (fl. 713–763) Another commentary, Remembering The Ornament of the Middle Way (Wylie: dbu ma rgyan gyi brjed byang), was written by Gyaltsab Je (1364–1432). Lobzang Dongak Chökyi Gyatso (Wylie: blo bzang mdo sngags chos kyi rgya mtsho, 1903–1957), also known as Tulku Sungrap, wrote the commentary translated into English as The Sword to Cut Through False Views (Wylie: dbu ma rgyan gyi mchan 'grel nyung ngu lta ngan gcod pa'i ral gri).

=== Ju Mipham ===
The title of Ju Mipham's Commentary (Wylie: dbu ma rgyan gyi rnam bshad 'jam dbyangs bla ma dgyes pa'i zhal lung) conveys Mipham's precepts in honouring the dictate of his guru (rtsa ba'i bla ma), Jamyang Khyentse Wangpo (1820–1892), who charged him with the commentary. Manjushri is used as a term of respect for the scholarship and understanding beyond letters and words of his Rimé teacher. Suchness is the revelation of Mipham's vajrayana from the Padmakara Translation Group's colophon (2005: p. 382):

Seeing that there are many reasons for expounding the Madhyamakalankara, Jamyang Khyentse Wangpo, our incomparable guide, unbounded in his kindness, whose very name I hardly dare to pronounce, who is the very personification of the compassion of the abbot Bodhisattva, of the master Padmasambhava, and of King Trisongdetsen, who is the sovereign among the learned and accomplished, who is supreme Manjushri appearing in the form of a monk in saffron robes, and whose renown fills the world, gave to me the Indian and Tibetan commentaries on the Madhyamakalankara, asking me to study them well and to compose a commentary. And as his diamondlike injunction came down upon my head, I earnestly gave myself to the task.

Ringu Tulku et al. (2006: pp. 193–194), in their survey of the Rimé movement, convey the importance of Mipham's Commentary to the Nyingmapa and their view of the Two Truths doctrine in light of the Svatantrika Madhyamaka ("those who assert the ultimate is the illusory nature") view and its Shentong Madhyamaka refinement as qualifying the Prasangika Madhyamaka ("those who make no assertions"):

Then, for the ultimate truth, there are two schools of Madhyamaka: those who assert the ultimate is the illusory nature, and those who make no assertions. To explain further, the first says that the illusory nature is established when the perceiver of an object experiences a perception of that object as being unreal. This view was put forth by Kamalashila, Shantarakshita, and other proponents of the Svatantrika Madhyamaka school. Their view is clearly explained in Mipham Jamyang Gyatso's commentary on Shantarakshita's 'Ornament of the Middle Way.' This commentary by Mipham Rinpoche is often considered the most important philosophical text of the Nyingma lineage in Tibet, particularly for those who follow Mipham Rinpoche's understanding of the Shentong Madhyamaka view.

== Neither one nor many ==
The mindstream of sentient beings is one application of the argument, neither one nor many. 'Neither one nor many' is an application of the third function of the catuṣkoṭi of Indian logic. Hopkins and Napper (1983, 1996: p. 160), in Meditation on Emptiness, discussed whether or not a series may be considered a unit:

When a continuum of a lifetime is sought in the individual moments of the continuum, it cannot be found. The continuum is not the individual moments nor their composite; if a continuum were a composite of the moments, either each moment would be a continuum or there would be no separate moments.

=== Mindstream ===
In the ninth shloka of the Madhyamālaṃkāra, Śāntarakṣita refutes personal singularity; "person" is conveyed a continuum understood as "neither one nor many". The Padmakara Translation Group qualifies the word "person" (Wylie: gang zag), extending it to all sentient beings. The shloka is translated by the group and Doctor. Ju Mipham's commentary on the verse is likewise translated by both sources. (Note: "The continuum of sentient beings, the ground that is said to be either fettered or liberated and extends from life to life in samsara, is assumed to be a single entity and is called a person. When it is said that a 'person' wanders in samsara and attains nirvana, many successive (conscious) instants are brought together and are so designated. The conceptual mind refers to this as a 'self', a 'man' and so forth. People do not examine what it is that constitutes their uninterrupted continuum and simply take it for their 'self' and think, "I am'".) (Note: "The streams of being of sentient beings form the basis for imputing such conventions as bondage, liberation, and the continuity from one cyclic existence to another. It is because of attachment to these streams as if they were singular that the convention of the so-called person is imputed. When it is said that 'the person wandered in cyclic existence but attained liberation', this is posited because of having bound together a multitude of successive instants. Based on the mental observation of those [instants], wandering beings speak of the self, the individual, and so forth, and [it is those instants] that are included in the stream of being. Thus they think, "I!" without any examination or investigation.)

== Five assertions ==
Ju Mipham made five assertions not unique to Śāntarakṣita's view:

1. Objects (fully qualified objects of comprehension) are posited only with respect to things able to function.
2. Consciousness in the absence of an object which knows and illuminates itself is uncommon.
3. The external appears through (or due to) one's own mind and is considered mind-only.
4. The ultimate is divided into enumerated and non-enumerated ultimates.
5. In the enumerated ultimate, objects found by individual valid cognition are understood without contradiction.

=== First ===
In the first assertion, Śāntarakṣita makes the Sautrantika distinction that objects of cognition are of two kinds: abstract, theoretical mental objects (including generalities, like classes of objects and their names) and actual things, defined as things which function. Although the Sautantrika made that distinction for conventional and ultimate truth, Śāntarakṣita discards theoretical or general objects and discusses actual things as conventional truth. He incorporates Dharmakirti's cognition which analyzes conventionalities, connecting that with cognition which analyzes for ultimacy.

=== Second ===
In the second assertion, a self-reflective awareness (svasaṃvedana) exists; consciousness can be aware of objects of cognition. This position was later critiqued by Je Tsongkhapa as implying that a self-reflective awareness is separate from objects of cognition. Ju Mipham later qualified its meaning; cognition is self-aware, not a separate material thing.

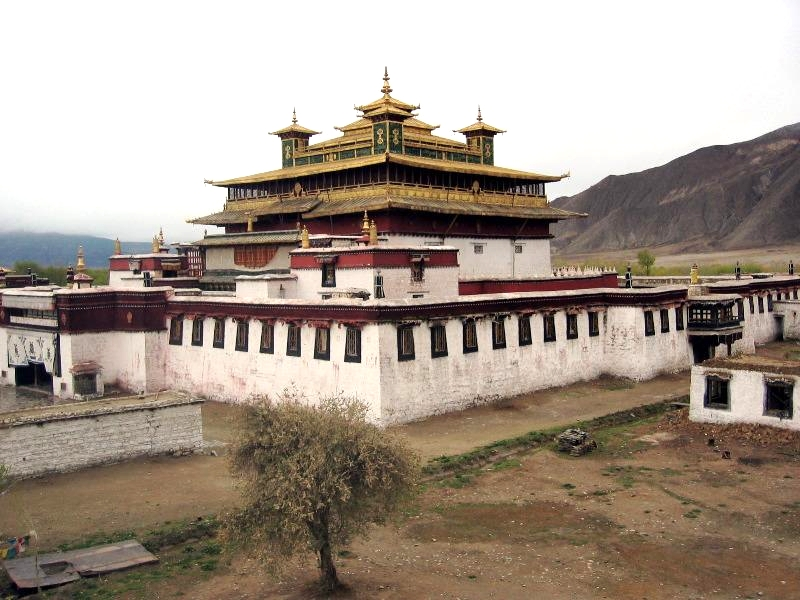
Samye Monastery, founded by Shantaraksita

=== Third ===
In the third assertion, the consciousness-only view of conventional appearances is the best way to progress. Still affirming the supremacy of the Madhyamaka school when students analyze for ultimacy, when relating to conventionalities the mind-only position is recommended.

=== Fourth ===
The fourth assertion distinguishes between the ultimate way of abiding established by the Madhyamaka method (the non-enumerated ultimate) and an approximate (enumerated) ultimate: a lesser, conventional understanding of the ultimate which leads to the non-enumerated ultimate. As part of his explanation of why this is useful, Mipham quotes Gorampa (who references the four conceptual extremes) (Wylie: mtha' bzhi; Sanskrit: caturanta):

The intellect of ordinary people, which investigates ultimate reality, cannot refute in a single stroke all four conceptual extremes. But by refuting these four extremes one after the other and by meditating properly, one reaches the path of seeing. This is called the view that sees the dharmadatu.

To analyze the extremes of existence and non-existence, Ju Mipham advises students to contemplate and establish the lack of inherent existence and then contemplate the extreme of non-existence. In contemplating step by step and enumerating the conceptual extremes, a student progresses toward the ultimate. When all extremes have been analyzed, they reach the non-enumerative (true) ultimate.

=== Fifth ===
In the fifth assertion, analysis of objects with respect to approximate (enumerated) ultimates does not create a problem of true establishment. A distinction can be made when analyzing for each case, including the two approaches to cognition (one for the conventional domain and the other to analyze for ultimacy) which are his additions to the Pramana tradition of valid cognition. Mipham uses this demonstration in his commentary to point out a problem with Je Tsongkhapa's approach of negating the predicate of "true establishment" instead of the object of perception, which is avoided in Śāntarakṣita's approach. Mipham also notes that many Prasaṅgika writers (similar to their Svatantrika counterparts) made positive assertions to move students closer to the ultimate view, pointing out that the distinction between Prasangika and Svatantrika lies in how students are taught about conventionalities and not in the consideration of ultimate truth. He concludes that Je Tsongkhapa, in making a distinction based on true establishment, proposes a Svatantrika rather than a Prasangika approach.
