= Śāntarakṣita =

Indian Buddhist philosopher (725-788)

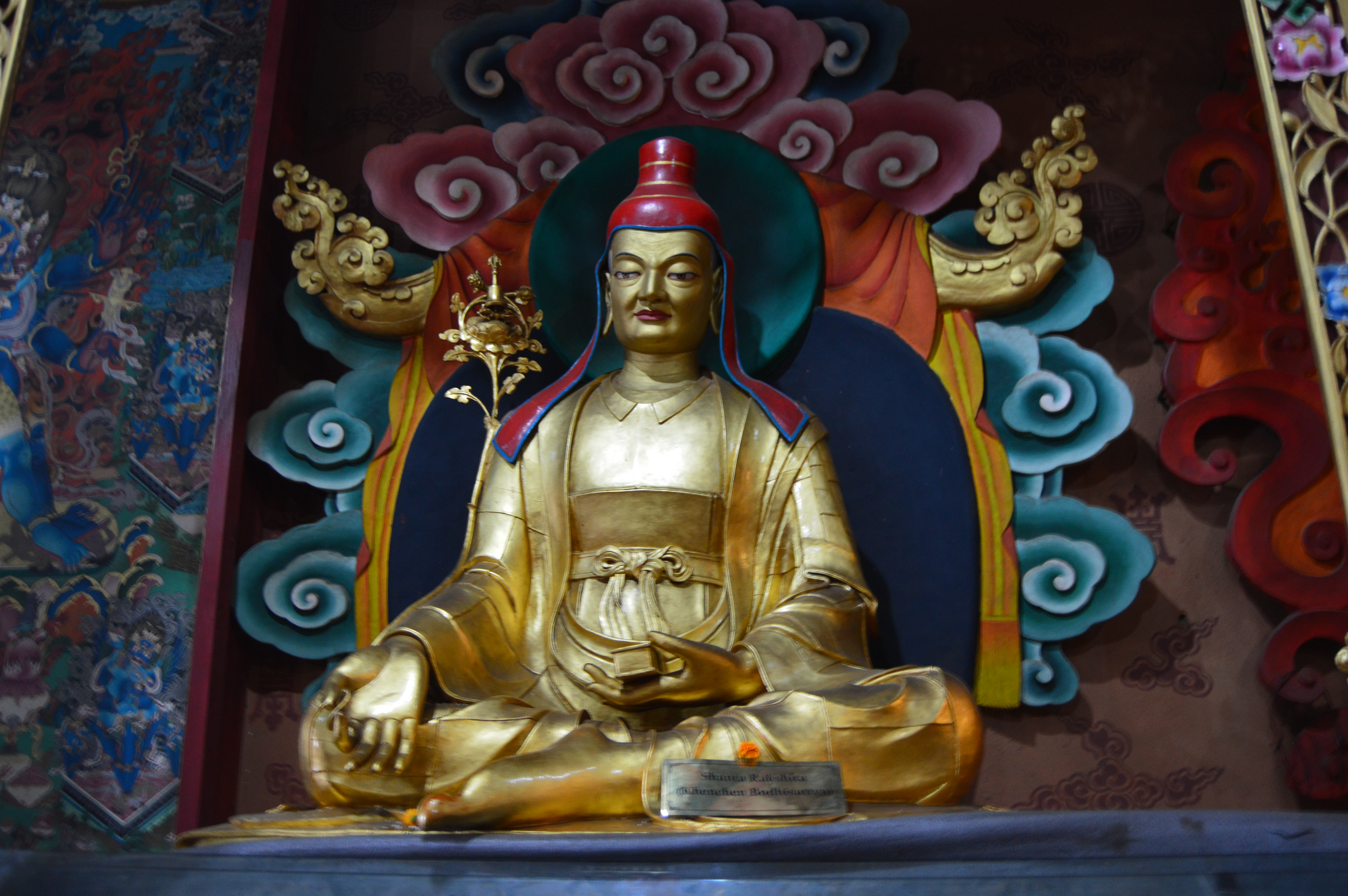
- Statue of Śāntarakṣita at Guru Lhakhang Monastery, Bouddhanath

Personal life
- Born: 725 CE
- Died: 788 CE
- Education: Nalanda
- Occupation: Translator, Philosopher, Abbot

Religious life
- Religion: Mahayana Buddhism

Śāntarakṣita (Sanskrit: शान्तरक्षित; Tibetan: ཞི་བ་འཚོ, Wylie: zhi ba tsho, 725–788), whose name translates into English as "protected by the One who is at peace" was an important and influential Indian Buddhist philosopher, particularly for the Tibetan Buddhist tradition. Śāntarakṣita was a philosopher of the Madhyamaka school who studied at Nalanda monastery under Jñānagarbha, and became the founder of Samye, the first Buddhist monastery in Tibet.

Śāntarakṣita defended a synthetic philosophy which combined Madhyamaka, Yogācāra and the logico-epistemology of Dharmakirti into a novel Madhyamaka philosophical system. This philosophical approach is known as Yogācāra-Mādhyamika or Yogācāra-Svatantrika-Mādhyamika in Tibetan Buddhism. Unlike other Madhyamaka philosophers, Śāntarakṣita accepted Yogācāra doctrines like mind-only (cittamatra) and self-reflective awareness (svasamvedana), but only on the level of conventional truth. According to James Blumenthal, this synthesis is the final major development in Indian Buddhist philosophy before the disappearance of Buddhism from India (c. 12-13th centuries).

== Biography ==
There are few historical records of Śāntarakṣita, with most available material being from hagiographic sources. Some of his history is detailed in a 19th-century commentary by Jamgon Ju Mipham Gyatso drawn from sources like the Blue Annals, Buton and Taranatha. According to Ju Mipham, Śāntarakṣita was the son of the king of Zahor. Some sources have identified Zahor with the area surrounding Bhagalpur and Banka in eastern Bihar. Tibetan sources refer to him, Jñānagarbha and Kamalasila as rang rgyud shar gsum meaning the "three eastern Svātantrikas".

Most sources contain little information about his life in India, as such all that can be known is that he was an Indian monk in the Mulasarvastivada lineage who lived during the time of the Pala Empire. Tibetan sources also state he studied under Jñānagarbha and eventually became the abbot of Nalanda University after mastering all branches of learning.

He was first invited to Tibet by king Trisong Detsen (c. 742–797) to help establish Buddhism there and his first trip to Tibet can be dated to 763. However, according to Tibetan sources like the Blue Annals, his first trip was unsuccessful and due to the activities of certain local spirits, he was forced to leave. He then spent six years in Nepal before returning to Tibet.

Tibetan sources then state that Śāntarakṣita later returned along with a tantric adept called Padmasambhava who performed the necessary magical rites to appease the unhappy spirits and to allow for the establishment of the first Buddhist monastery in Tibet. Once this was done, Śāntarakṣita oversaw the construction of Samye monastery (meaning: "the Inconceivable", Skt. acintya) starting in 775 CE on the model of the Indian monastery of Uddaṇḍapura.

He then ordained the first seven Tibetan Buddhist monastics there with the aid of twelve Indian monks (circa 779). He stayed at Samye as the abbot (upadhyaya) for the rest of his life (thirteen years after completion). At Samye, Śāntarakṣita established a Buddhist monastic curriculum based on the Indian model. He also oversaw the translation of Buddhist scriptures into Tibetan. During this period, various other Indian scholars came to Tibet to work on translation, including Vimalamitra, Buddhaguhya, Śāntigarbha and Viśuddhasiṃha. Tibetan sources state that he died suddenly in an accident after being kicked by a horse.

== Philosophy and teachings ==
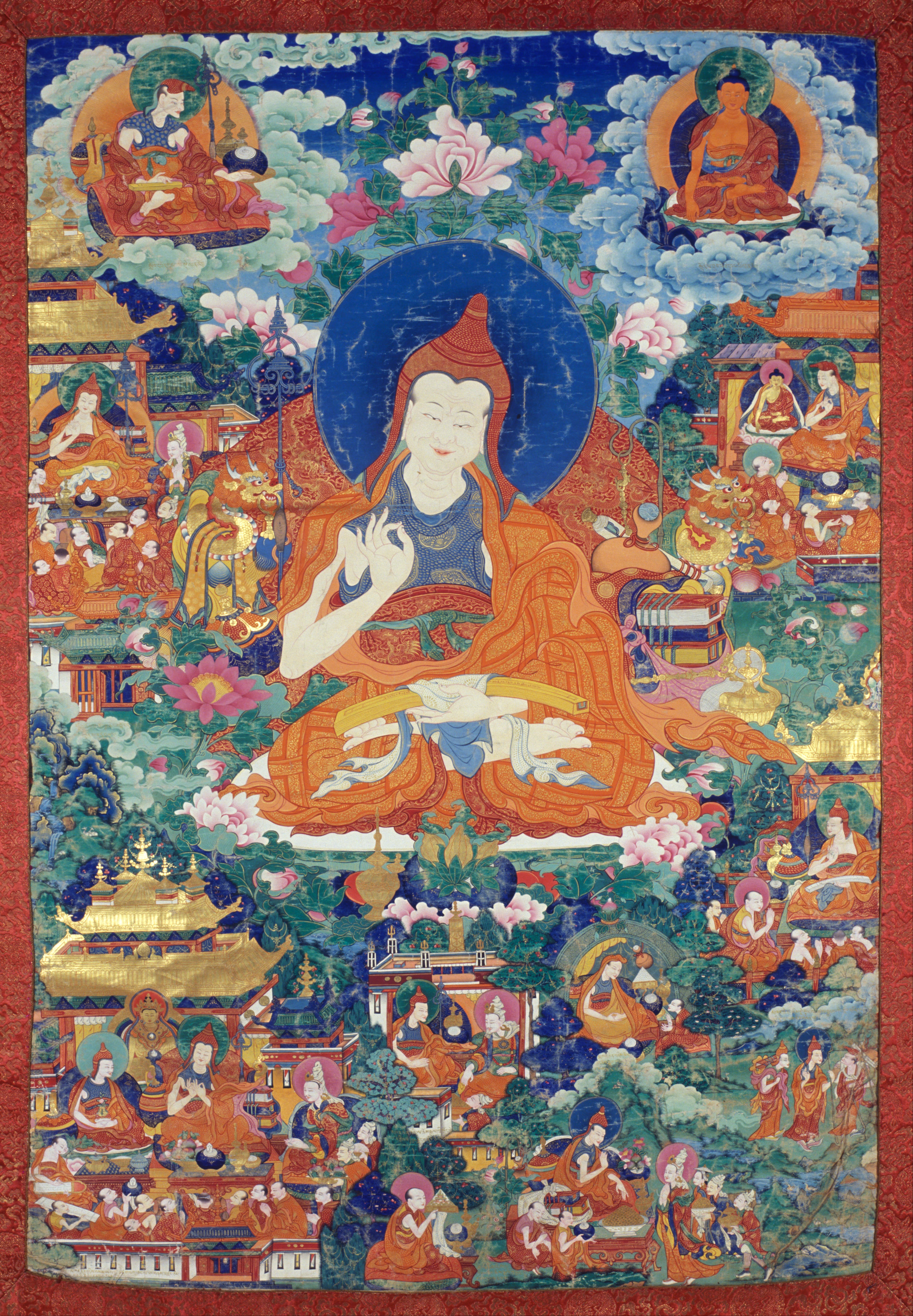
19th-century painting depicting biographical episodes from the life of Shantarakshita

According to Tibetan sources, Śāntarakṣita and his students initially focused on teaching the 'ten good actions' (Sanskrit: daśakuśalakarmapatha), the six paramitas (transcendent virtues), a summary of the Mahāyāna and 'the chain of dependent origination' (pratītyasamutpāda).

Tibetan sources indicate that he and his student Kamalaśīla mainly taught a gradual path to Buddhahood (most thoroughly outlined in the Bhāvanākrama of Kamalaśīla). Ju Mipham writes that when he came to Tibet, "he set forth the ten good virtues, the eighteen dhatus, and the twelve fold chain of dependent arising."

Śāntarakṣita is best known for his syncretic interpretation of Madhyamaka philosophy which also makes use of Yogācāra and Dharmakirtian epistemology. His Madhyamaka view is most clearly outlined in his Madhyamakālaṃkāra (The Ornament of the Middle Way) and his own commentary on that text, the Madhyamakālaṃkāravṛtti (The Auto-Commentary on The Ornament of the Middle Way). Śāntarakṣita is not the first Buddhist thinker to attempt a synthesis of Madhyamaka thought with Yogācāra. Though Śāntarakṣita is often regarded as the leading exponent of this approach, earlier figures such as Vimuktisena, Srigupta and Śāntarakṣita's teacher Jñānagarbha had already written from a similar syncretic perspective.

Like other Indian Madhyamaka thinkers, Śāntarakṣita explains the ontological status of phenomena through the use of the doctrine of the "two truths": the ultimate (paramārtha) and the conventional (saṃvṛti). While in an ultimate or absolute sense, all phenomena as seen by Madhyamaka as being "empty" (shunya) of essence or inherent nature (svabhāva), they can be said to have some kind of conventional, nominal or provisional existence. James Blumenthal summarizes Śāntarakṣita's syncretic view thus: "Śāntarakṣita advocates a Madhyamaka perspective when describing ultimate truths, and a Yogācāra perspective when describing conventional truths."

According to Blumenthal, Śāntarakṣita's thought also emphasized the importance of studying the "lower" Buddhist schools. These lesser views were "seen as integral stepping stones on the ascent to his presentation of what he considered to be the ultimately correct view of Madhyamaka". This way of using a doxographic hierarchy to present Buddhist philosophy remains influential in Tibetan Buddhist thought.

=== Ultimate Truth and neither-one-nor-many ===
Like other Madhyamaka thinkers, Śāntarakṣita sees the ultimate truth as being the emptiness of all phenomena (i.e., their lack of inherent existence or essence). He makes use of the "neither-one-nor-many argument" in his Madhyamakālaṃkāra as a way to argue for emptiness. The basic position is outlined by the following stanza:

These entities, as asserted by our own [Buddhist schools] and other [non-Buddhist schools], have no inherent nature at all because in reality they have neither a singular nor manifold nature, like a reflected image.

The main idea in his argument is that any given phenomenon (i.e. dharma), cannot be said to have an inherent nature or essence (i.e. svabhāva), because such a nature cannot be proven to exist either as a singular nature (ekasvabhāva) or as a multiplicity of natures (anekasvabhāva).

In the Madhyamakālaṃkāra, Śāntarakṣita analyses all the different phenomena posited by Buddhist and non-Buddhist schools through the neither-one-nor-many schema, proving that they cannot be shown to exist as a single thing or as a manifold collection of many phenomena. Śāntarakṣita usually begins by looking at any phenomenon that is asserted by his interlocutor as having a truly singular nature and then showing how it cannot actually be singular.

For example, when analyzing the Sāṃkhya school's doctrine of a Fundamental Nature (Prakṛti, the permanent, un-caused absolute cause of everything), Śāntarakṣita states that this permanent and fundamental nature cannot be truly singular because it "contributes to the production of successive effects." Since "each successive effect is distinct", then this fundamental nature which is contributing to all these different effects arising at different times is not really singular.

After critiquing the non-Buddhist ideas, Śāntarakṣita turns his arguments against Buddhist ideas, such as the theory of svabhāva, the theory of atoms (paramanu), the theory of the person (pudgala), theories regarding space (akasa) and nirvana. He also critiques the Sautrantika and Yogacara Buddhists who held that consciousness (vijñāna) is truly singular and yet knows a variety of objects. In his analysis of consciousness, Śāntarakṣita concludes that it is just like other entities in the sense that it can be neither unitary nor multiple. Therefore, he (like other Madhyamikas) refuses to assign any ultimate reality to consciousness and sees it as empty of any inherent nature. Furthermore, he also critiques the Yogacara theory of the three natures.

Śāntarakṣita then turns to a critique of the idea that there is a truly manifold nature in phenomena. Śāntarakṣita's main argument here is that any manifold nature or essence would depend on an aggregation of singular essences. But since singular essences have been proven to be irrational, then there can also be no manifold essence. Because of this, phenomena cannot have any inherent nature or essence at all, since the very idea of such a thing is irrational.

=== The Conventional ===
All Madhyamikas agree on an anti-essentialist view which rejects all permanent essences, inherent natures, or true existence. However, they do not all agree on conventional truth, that is, the best way of describing how it is that phenomena "exist" in a relative sense. In his Madhyamakālaṃkāra, Śāntarakṣita argues that phenomena which are "characterized only by conventionality" are those phenomena that "are generated and disintegrate and those that have the ability to function."

According to Blumenthal, the main criteria for conventional entities given by Śāntarakṣita in his Madhyamakālaṃkāra and its commentary are the following:

1. that which is known by a mind,
2. that which has the ability to function (i.e., that it is causally efficacious),
3. that which is impermanent, and
4. that which is unable to withstand analysis which searches for an ultimate nature or essence in entities.

Furthermore, causal efficacy and impermanence are qualities that conventional truths have due to the fact that they are dependently originated, that is, they arise due to causes and conditions which are themselves impermanent (and so on). Also, conventional truths are described by Śāntarakṣita as being known by conceptual thought and designated based on worldly custom.

One important element of Śāntarakṣita's presentation of conventional truth is that he also incorporates certain views from the Yogācāra school, mainly the idea that conventional phenomena are just consciousness as well as the concept of self-cognizing consciousness or reflexive awareness (svasamvedana). The Madhyamakālaṃkāra argues in favor of the Yogācāra position on a conventional level and states that "that which is cause and result is mere consciousness only". Thus, Śāntarakṣita incorporates the Yogācāra school's analysis into his Madhyamaka framework as a useful way of understanding conventional reality and as a stepping stone to the highest view of emptiness of all phenomena.

== Works ==
Around 11 works may have been written by Śāntarakṣita, some survive in Tibetan translation and others in Sanskrit. Some of his texts survive in Jain libraries, showing that he was a figure that was taken seriously even by some of his non-Buddhist opponents.

His main known works include:

- *Aṣṭatathāgatastotra (D 1166/ P 2055), a short praise.
- *Śrīva-jradharasaṅgītibhagavatstotraṭīkā (D 1163/ P 2052), a short praise.
- Tattvasiddhi (D 39a1/ P 42a8), a philosophical defense of tantra, the authorship is doubtful.
- Saṅvaraviṃśakavṛtti (D 4082/ P 5583), focuses on the training and practice of a bodhisattva and is actually a commentary on Candragomin's Bodhisattvasaṃvaraviṃśaka. It is also related to the Bodhisattvabhumi.
- Satyadvayavibhaṅgapañjikā (D 3883/ P 5283), an extensive commentary on Jñānagarbha's Satyadvayavibhaṅga. The authorship has been questioned by various scholars, including some Tibetans like Tsongkhapa and Taranatha.
- Paramārthaviniścaya, now lost.
- Vādanyāyaṭīkā vipañcitārthā (D 4239/ P 5725), a commentary on Dharmakīrti's Vādanyāya.
- Tattvasaṅgraha, a massive polemical compendium of Indian philosophy covering Buddhist and non-Buddhist views. There is also a commentary on this text by Kamalaśīla.
- Madhyamakālaṅkāra and its autocommentary, the Madhyamakālaṅkāravṛtti. This is his main exposition of his synthetic Madhyamaka views. Kamalaśīla also composed a commentary to this text, the Madhyamakālaṅkārapañjikā.

=== Tattvasaṅgraha ===
Śāntarakṣita's Tattvasaṅgraha (Compendium on Reality/Truth) is a huge and encyclopaedic treatment (over 3,600 verses distributed into 26 chapters) of the major Indian philosophic views of the time. In this text, the author outlines the views of the numerous non-Buddhist Indian traditions of his time.

Unlike previous Madhyamaka texts which were organized around Buddhist categories to be refuted and discussed, the Tattvasaṅgraha is mainly organized around refuting non-Buddhist views which were becoming increasingly sophisticated and prominent during Śāntarakṣita's era (though space is also saved for certain Buddhist views as well, like pudgalavada i.e. "personalism"). In this text, Śāntarakṣita explains and then refutes many non-Buddhist views systematically, including Sāṅkhya's primordial matter Nyāya's creator god (Īśvara) and six different theories on the self (ātman). He also defends the Buddhist doctrine of momentariness, rejects the Vaiśeṣika ontological categories, discusses philosophy of language and epistemology as well as Jain theories, Sarvastivada philosophy, and critiques the materialism of the Cārvākas and the scriptural views of Mīmāṃsā.

A Sanskrit version of this work was discovered in 1873 by Dr. G. Bühler in the Jain temple of Pārśva at Jaisalmer. This version contains also the commentary by Śāntarakṣita's pupil Kamalaśīla.

=== Madhyamakālaṅkāra ===
Śāntarakṣita's synthesis of Madhyamaka, Yogacara, and Dharmakirtian thought was expounded in his Madhyamakālaṅkāra (Ornament of the Middle Way). In this short verse text, Śāntarakṣita critiques some key Hindu and Buddhist views and then details his presentation of the two truths doctrine. This presents Yogacara Idealism as the superior way of analyzing conventional truth while retaining the Madhyamaka philosophy of emptiness as the ultimate truth. In the last verses of this text, he summarizes his approach as follows:

“Based on the standpoint of mind-only one must know the non-existence of external entities. Based on this standpoint of the non-intrinsic nature of all dharmas one must know that there is no self at all even in that which is mind-only. Therefore, those who hold the reins of logic while riding the carriage of the two systems [Mādhyamika and Yogācāra], attain the stage of a true Mahāyānist.”

== Influence ==
Mipham lists Śāntarakṣita's main Indian students as Kamalaśīla, Haribhadra and Dharmamitra. He also notes that other Indian scholars like masters Jñanapada, and Abhayākaragupta (c. 1100 CE) "also established the view of Prajnaparamita in accordance with this tradition". Furthermore, according to David Seyfort Ruegg, other later Indian scholars such as Vidyākaraprabha (c. 800 CE), Nandasri, Buddhajñāna(pāda), Jitāri, and Kambalapāda also belongs to this Yogācāra-Mādhyamaka tradition.

Ju Mipham further states that this tradition was continued by Tibetan scholars such as Ngok Lotsawa, Chaba Chökyi Senge and Rongton Choje. Śāntarakṣita's work also influenced numerous later Tibetan figures such as Yeshe De (ca. 8th c.), Sakya Pandita (1182–1251), Tsongkhapa (1357–1419) and Ju Mipham Gyatso (1846–1912).

Śāntarakṣita's philosophy remained the main interpretation of Madhyamaka in Tibetan Buddhism from the 8th century until the time of the second dissemination in the eleventh and twelfth centuries when Candrakirti's work began to be translated. Blumenthal notes that already in the time of Patsab (12th century) "the Prasaṅgika-Madhyamaka view began to be widely taught and the privileging of Śāntarakṣita's system began to encounter serious opposition." Je Tsongkhapa's (1357-1419) interpretation of Prasaṅgika Madhyamaka, and his new school, the Gelug, raised serious and influential critiques of Śāntarakṣita's position. In no small part due to his efforts, Prasaṅgika Madhyamaka replaced Śāntarakṣita's Madhyamaka as the dominant interpretation of Madhyamaka in Tibetan Buddhism.

In the late 19th century, Ju Mipham attempted to promote Yogācāra-Mādhyamaka again as part of the Rimé movement and as a way to discuss specific critiques of Je Tsongkhapa's widely influential philosophy. The Rimé movement was funded by the secular authorities in Derge, Kham, and began to establish centres of learning encouraging the study of traditions different from the dominant Gelug tradition in central Tibet. This Rimé movement revitalised the Sakya, Kagyu, Nyingma and Jonang traditions, which had been by almost supplanted by the Gelug hegemony.

As part of that movement the 19th century Nyingma scholar Jamgon Ju Mipham Gyatso wrote the first commentary in almost 400 years about Śāntarakṣita's Madhyamakālaṅkāra. According to his student Kunzang Palden, Mipham had been asked by his teacher Jamyang Khyentse Wangpo to write a survey of all the major Mahayana philosophic shastras for use in the Nyingma monastic colleges. Mipham's commentaries now form the backbone of the Nyingma monastic curriculum. The Madhyamakālaṅkāra, which was almost forgotten by the 19th century, is now studied by all Nyingma shedra students.

== Sources ==
- Banerjee, Anukul Chandra. Acaraya Santaraksita in Bulletin of Tibetology, New Series No. 3, p. 1–5. (1982). Gangtok, Sikkim Research Institute of Tibetology and Other Buddhist Studies.
- Blumenthal, James. The Ornament of the Middle Way: A Study of the Madhyamaka Thought of Shantarakshita. Snow Lion, (2004). ISBN 1-55939-205-3 – a study and translation of the primary Gelukpa commentary on Shantarakshita's treatise: Gyal-tsab Je's Remembering The Ornament of the Middle Way.
- Blumenthal, James and James Apple, "Śāntarakṣita", The Stanford Encyclopedia of Philosophy (Spring 2018 Edition), Edward N. Zalta (ed.), .
- Doctor, Thomas H. (trans.) Mipham, Jamgon Ju. Speech of Delight: Mipham's Commentary of Shantarakshita's Ornament of the Middle Way. Ithaca: Snow Lion Publications (2004). ISBN 1-55939-217-7
- Eltschinger, Vincent. "Śāntarakṣita" in Brill's Encyclopedia of Buddhism. Volume II: Lives (2019)
- Ichigō, Masamichi (ed. & tr.). Madhyamakālaṁkāra of śāntarakṣita with his own commentary of Vṛtti and with the subcommentary or Pañjikā of Kamalaśīla. Kyoto: Buneido (1985).
- Jha, Ganganath (trans.) The Tattvasangraha of Shantaraksita with the Commentary of Kamalashila. 2 volumes. First Edition : Baroda, (G.O.S. No. Lxxxiii) (1939). Reprint; Motilal Banarsidass, Delhi, (1986).
- Murthy, K. Krishna. Buddhism in Tibet. Sundeep Prakashan (1989) ISBN 81-85067-16-3.
- Prasad, Hari Shankar (ed.). Santaraksita, His Life and Work. (Collected Articles from "All India Seminar on Acarya Santaraksita" held on 3–5 August 2001 at Namdroling Monastery, Mysore, Karnataka). New Delhi, Tibet House, (2003).
- Phuntsho, Karma. Mipham's Dialectics and Debates on Emptiness: To Be, Not to Be or Neither. London: RoutledgeCurzon (2005) ISBN 0-415-35252-5
- Śāntarakṣita (author); Jamgon Ju Mipham Gyatso (commentator); Padmakara Translation Group (translators)(2005). The Adornment of the Middle Way: Shantarakshita's Madhyamakalankara with commentary by Jamgön Mipham. Boston, Massachusetts, USA: Shambhala Publications, Inc. ISBN 1-59030-241-9 (alk. paper)
- Sodargye, Khenpo (索达吉堪布) (trans.) . 中观庄严论释 (A Chinese translation of the Mipham's Commentary of Ornament of the Middle Way). online version
