= Khenpo Sodargye =

Tibetan Buddhist writer and monk

- མཁན་པོ བསོད་དར་རྒྱས
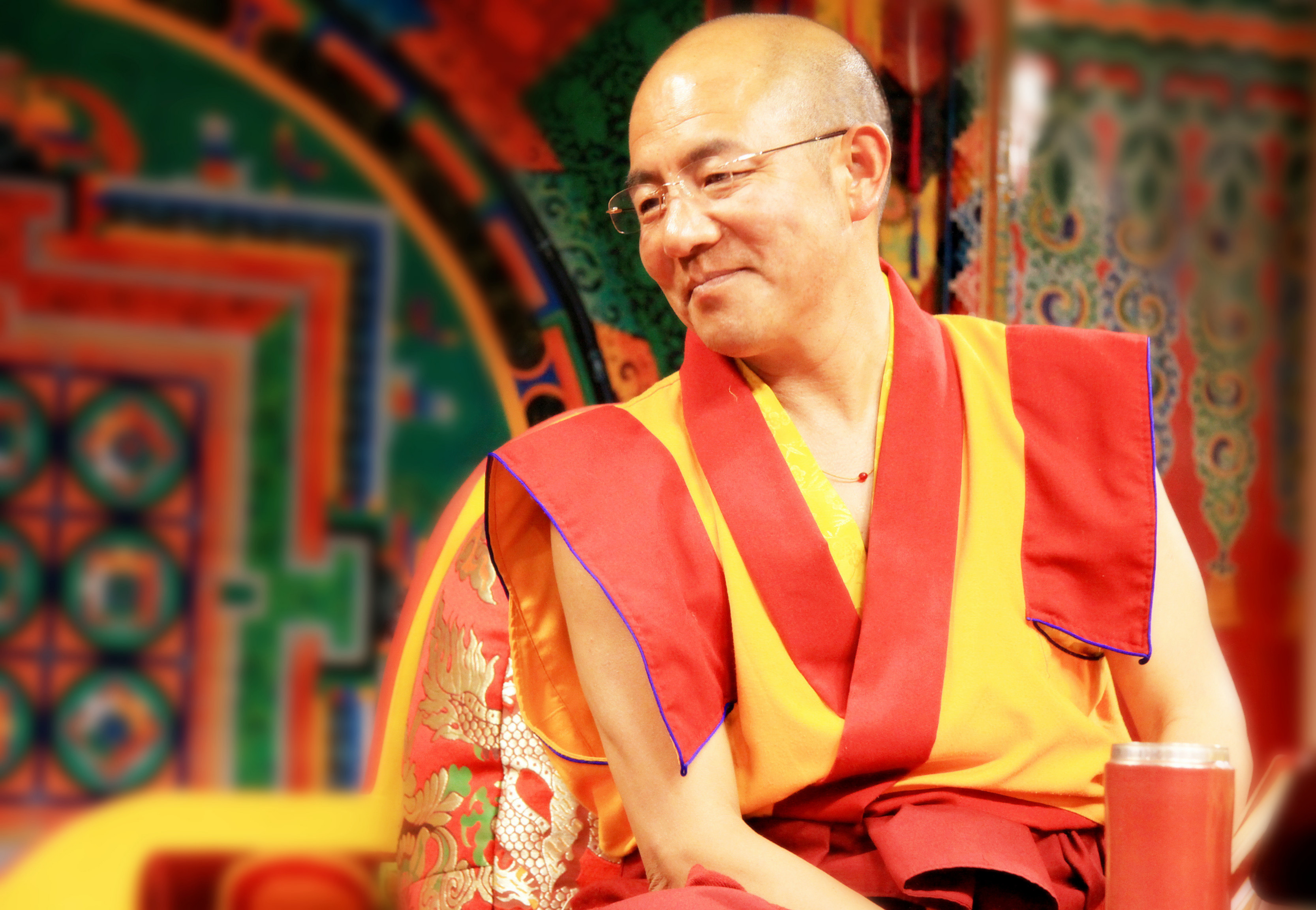
- Khenpo Sodargye on Dharma Throne

Personal life
- Born: 1962 (age 63–64)
- Home town: Kham

Religious life
- Religion: Buddhist
- Institute: Larung Buddhist Institute
- Ordination: 1985

Senior posting
- Teacher: Khenchen Jigme Phuntsok Rinpoche

Khenpo Sodargye (Tibetan：མཁན་པོ བསོད་དར་རྒྱས；Chinese: 索达吉堪布) is a contemporary Buddhist master, and was born in the eastern region of Tibet known as Kham in 1962. Khenpo is a Tibetan lama, a Buddhist scholar and teacher, a prolific translator into Chinese, and a modern Buddhist thinker renowned across Asia and the west for his interest in the integration of traditional Buddhist teachings with worldwide issues and modern life.

== Career ==
In 1985 Khenpo was ordained at Larung Buddhist Institute, the largest Buddhist academy of its kind in the world, which is in present-day Sichuan province of the PRC. He trained closely with Khenchen Jigme Phuntsok Rinpoche, one of the great luminaries of his generation.

Khenpo Sodargye studied the traditional course of philosophical treatises and also received the entire corpus of Tibetan Buddhist transmissions. (These teachings include the five principle treatises on Madhyamaka, Prajnaparamita, Abhidharma, Vinaya, and Buddhist Logic, as well as the Great Perfection, Kalachakra, and Mipham Rinpoche's Guhyagarbha Tantra and Longchenpa's Seven Treasuries and Trilogy of Finding Comfort and Ease.) He was eventually placed in charge of the institute, where he became one of the principal teachers. He also served as Jigme Phuntsok Rinpoche’s main translator for Chinese disciples and was assigned by Rinpoche to teach them.

He has lectured extensively across China and other parts of Asia, Oceania, Europe as well as Africa and North America. He has recently given lectures at a number of universities, including Peking University, Tsinghua, Harvard, Columbia, Yale, Princeton, Stanford, Oxford, Cambridge, University of Toronto, McGill University, University of Auckland, Melbourne University, University of Tokyo, Waseda University, National University of Singapore, National Taiwan University, University of Hong Kong and University of Göttingen.

== Dharma propagation ==
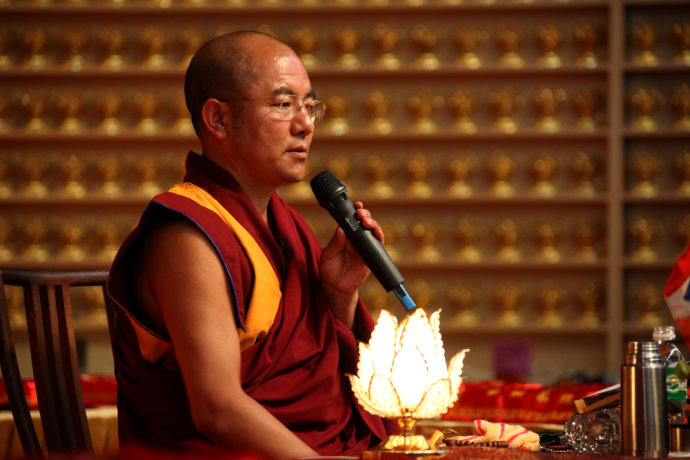
Khenpo Sodargye teaching at Hong Kong Buddhist Tri-Virtues Advocate Center in July 2011

In 1987, Khenpo accompanied Kyabje Khenchen Jigme Phuntsok Rinpoche to make a pilgrimage to the holy Wutai Mountain and began to receive Chinese disciples of the four types (monks, nuns, male and female lay practitioners).

From 1990 to 1999, Khenpo accompanied Kyabje Rinpoche to give Dharma teachings in many countries worldwide, including the United States, Canada, France, Germany, the Netherlands, United Kingdom, Bhutan, India, Nepal, Singapore, Malaysia, Thailand and Japan.

In 2006, Khenpo began to use modern media, such as Internet and DVD, to spread his teachings; allowing more followers to receive systematic Dharma training and benefiting a wider base of fortunate beings.

Since late 2015, he has instructed his students to offer open online courses on Buddhism in English.
