= Pandita (Buddhism) =

Learned and wise person

In Buddhism, paṇḍita (Pali, Sanskrit; Tibetan: khepa; Wyl: mkhas pa) is a term meaning "a wise, learned, or astute person". This term has been used by Buddhists in several distinct but related ways, all referring to people who have an understanding of the Buddhist teachings.

== Theravada Buddhism ==
In Theravada Buddhism, as it is used in the Bāla-paṇḍita Sutta (SN 12.19) and other suttas of the Pali Canon, pandita denotes those who possess wisdom or knowledge of the Dhamma. Paṇḍita Sutta (AN 3.45) describes three things recommended by astute true persons (paṇḍita), that is giving (dāna), going forth (pabbajjā), and taking care of your mother and father (mātāpitūnaṁ upaṭṭhānaṁ). Moreover, the wise person (paṇḍita) is also described as:

- One who recognizes when they’ve made a mistake, and one who properly accepts the confession of someone who’s made a mistake (AN 2.22).
- One who doesn’t take responsibility for what has not come to pass, and one who does take responsibility for what has come to pass (AN 2.99).
- One who thinks well, speaks well, and acts well (AN 3.3).

== Mahayana Buddhism ==
In Mahayana and Vajrayana Buddhism, pandita was a title awarded to scholars who have mastered the five sciences (Sanskrit: pañcavidyāsthāna; Tib. rigné chenpo nga; Wyl. rig gnas chen po lnga) in which a learned person was traditionally supposed to be well-versed. The first (and one of the only) Tibetans afforded the title was Sakya Pandita.

The five sciences are:

- science of language (śabdavidyā),
- science of logic (hetuvidyā),
- science of medicine (cikitsāvidyā),
- science of fine arts and crafts (śilakarmasthānavidyā),
- science of spirituality (adhyātmavidyā).

The stipulation can be traced to (but may well predate) the Mahāyāna-sūtrālamkāra-kārikā, which states: "Without becoming a scholar in the five sciences, not even the supreme sage can become omniscient. For the sake of refuting and supporting others, and for the sake of knowing everything himself, he makes an effort in these [five sciences]."

== Regional traditions ==
=== Myanmar ===
In Myanmar Buddhism, the term aggamahāpaṇḍita (Burmese: အဂ္ဂမဟာပဏ္ဍိတ, pronounced [ʔɛʔɡa̰ məhà pàɰ̃dḭta̰]) is used as an honorific Burmese Buddhist title conferred by the Myanmar government to distinguished Theravada Buddhist monks.

=== Indonesia ===
In Indonesian Buddhism, pandita (abbreviated Pdt. as a title) refers to trained and certified householders (upasaka-upasika, those who are not Buddhist monks or nuns) who provide religious services (veyyāvacca) and Dhamma talks (dhammadesanā).
