= Tengyur =

Tibetan collection of commentaries to the Buddha Shakyamuni's teachings

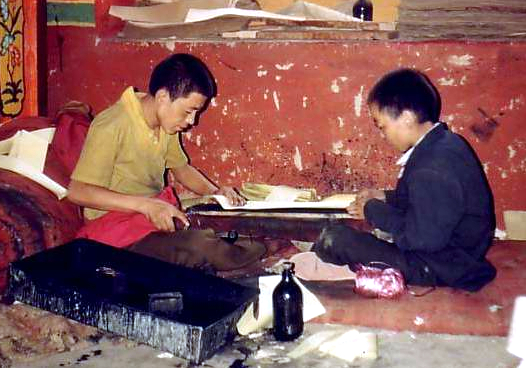
- Young monks printing scriptures in Sera Monastery, Tibet

Tibetan name
- Tibetan: བསྟན་འགྱུར
Transcriptions
- Wylie: bstan 'gyur

The Tengyur or Tanjur or Bstan-’gyur (Tibetan: "Translation of Teachings") is the collected commentaries by great buddhist masters on Buddha Shakyamuni's teachings. The Tengyur is included in the Tibetan Buddhist Canon, which consists of all of Buddha Shakyamuni's teachings together with the commentaries on the Buddha's teachings. The Canon also includes the Kangyur, which is repository of the Buddha's recorded teachings, placed before the Tengyur in the Canon.

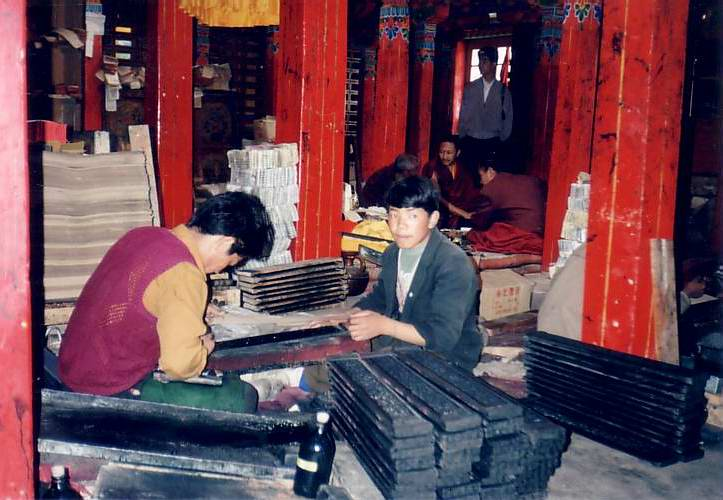
Printing the scriptures, Sera Monastery

== The Buddhist Canon ==
To the Tengyur were assigned commentaries to both Sutras and Tantras, treatises and abhidharma works (both Mahayana and non-Mahayana).

Together with the 108-volume Kangyur (the Collection of the Words of the Buddha), these form the basis of the Tibetan Buddhist canon. "The Kangyur usually takes up a hundred or a hundred and eight volumes, the Tengyur two hundred and twenty-five, and the two together contain 4,569 works."

As example, the content of the Beijing Tengyur:

- Stotras ("Hymns of Praise"): 1 Volume; 64 texts.
- Commentaries on the Tantras: 86 Volumes; 3055 texts.
- Commentaries on Sutras; 137 Volumes; 567 texts.
1. Prajnaparamita Commentaries, 16 Volumes.
2. Madhyamika Treatises, 29 Volumes.
3. Yogacara Treatises, 29 Volumes.
4. Abhidharma, 8 Volumes.
5. Miscellaneous Texts, 4 Volumes.
6. Vinaya Commentaries, 16 Volumes.
7. Tales and Dramas, 4 Volumes.
8. Technical Treatises, 43 Volumes.

== The Bön Tengyur ==
The Tibetan Bön religion, under the influence of Buddhism, also has its canon literature divided into two sections called the Kangyur and Tengyur but the number and contents of the collection are not yet fully known. Apparently, Bön began to take on a more literary form about the time Buddhism began to enter Tibet, although it could have had some written records some time before that.

== See also ==
- Buddhism
- Kangyur
