= Prajnaparamita =

Principle in Buddhism and the texts associated with it

Translations of Prajñāpāramitā
- English: Perfection of Transcendent Wisdom
- Sanskrit: प्रज्ञापारमिता 𑖢𑖿𑖨𑖕𑖿𑖗𑖯𑖢𑖯𑖨𑖦𑖰𑖝𑖯 (IAST: Prajñāpāramitā)
- Burmese: ပညာပါရမီတ (MLCTS: pjɪ̀ɰ̃ɲà pàɹəmìta̰)
- Chinese: 般若波羅蜜多 (Pinyin: bōrě bōluómìduō)
- Japanese: 般若波羅蜜多 (Rōmaji: hannya-haramitta)
- Khmer: ប្រាជ្ញាបារមី (UNGEGN: prachnhéabarômi)
- Korean: 반야바라밀다 (RR: Banyabaramilda)
- Mongolian: Төгөлдөр билгүүн
- Sinhala: ප්‍රඥා පාරමිතා
- Tibetan: ་ཤེས་རབ་ཀྱི་ཕ་རོལ་ཏུ་ཕྱིན་པ་ (shes rab kyi pha rol tu chin pa)
- Thai: ปรัชญาปารมิตา
- Vietnamese: Bát-nhã-ba-la-mật-đa

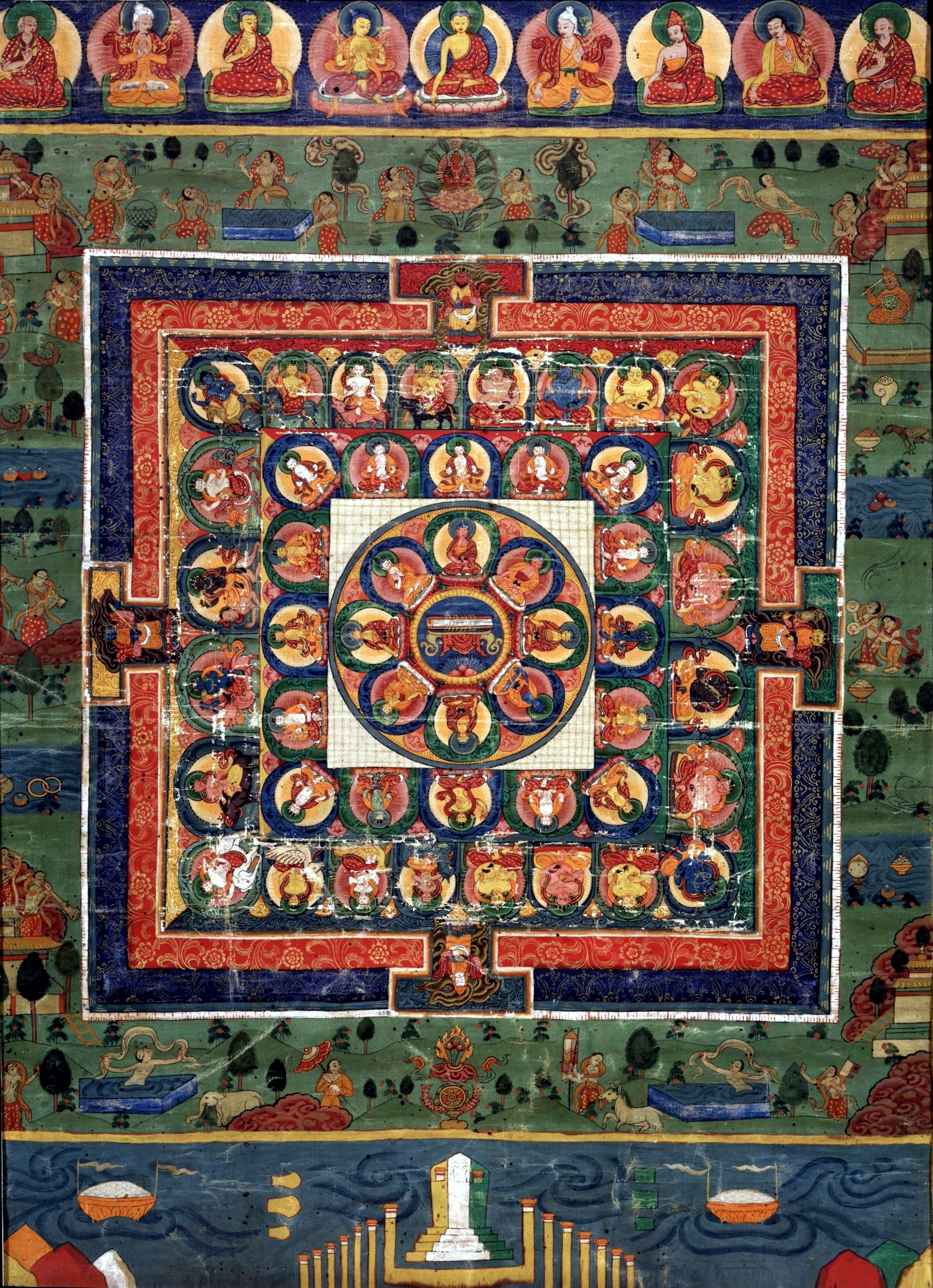
A Tibetan painting with a Prajñāpāramitā sūtra at the center of the mandala

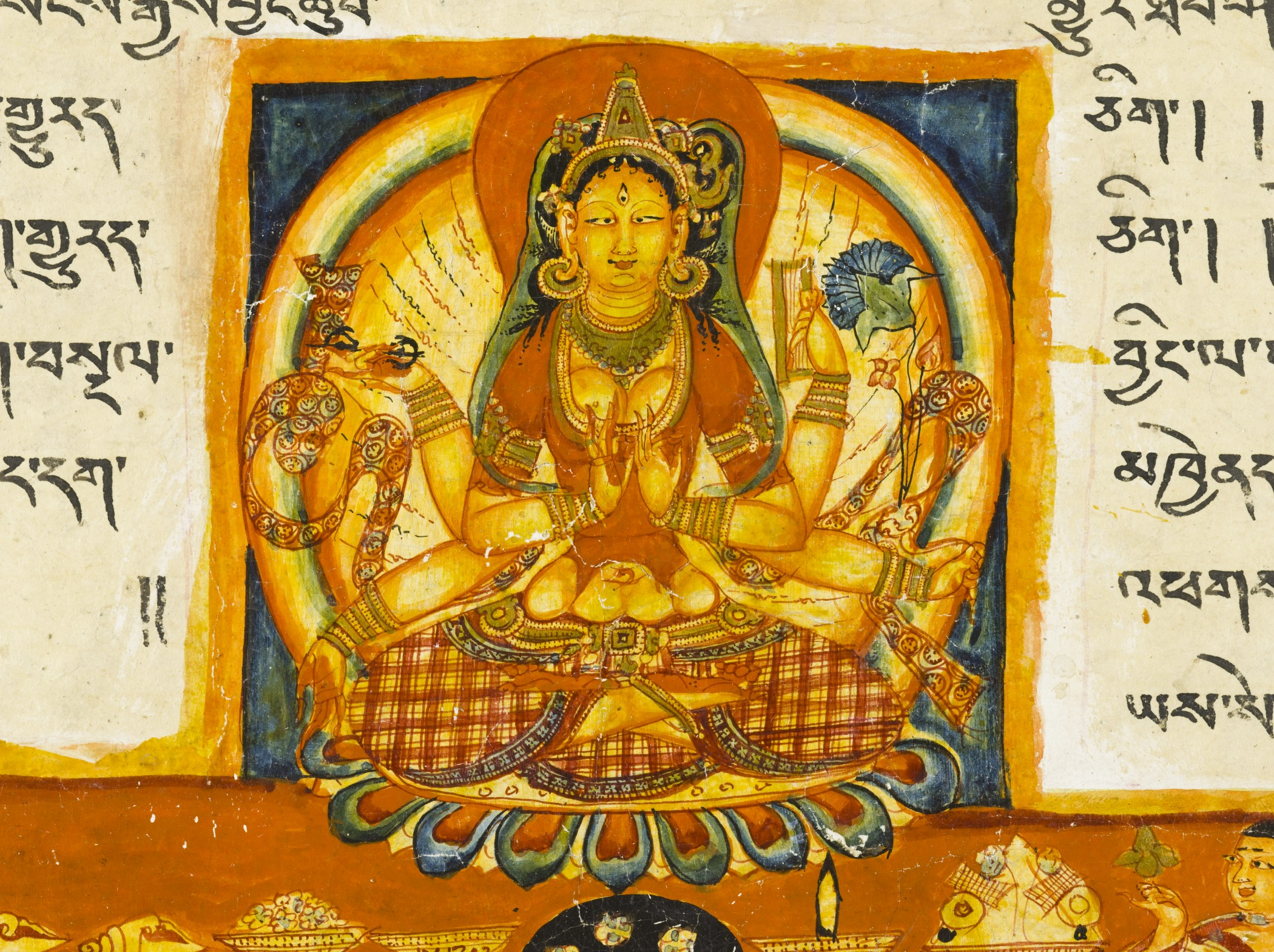
Prajñāpāramitā Devi, a personification of Transcendent Wisdom, Folio from a Tibetan 100,000 line Prajñāpāramitā manuscript

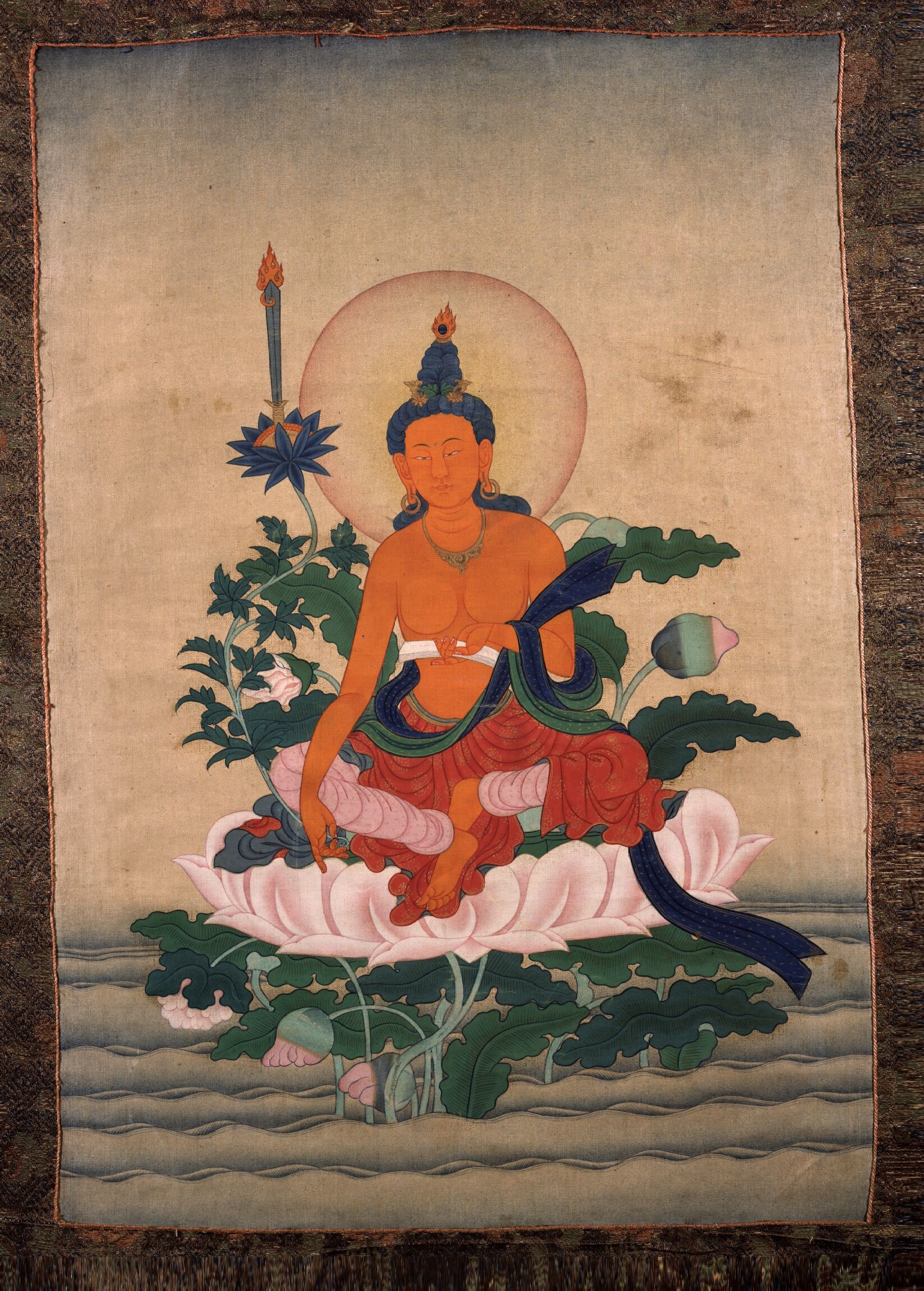
Tibetan Painting of Mañjuśrī bodhisattva with the sword of wisdom and a sūtra manuscript, which are common symbols of Prajñāpāramitā in Buddhist art

Prajñāpāramitā means "the Perfection of Wisdom" or "Transcendental Knowledge" in Mahāyāna Buddhism. Prajñāpāramitā refers to a perfected way of seeing the nature of reality, as well as to a particular body of Mahāyāna scriptures (sūtras), known as the Prajñāpāramitā sutras, which includes such texts as the Heart Sutra and Diamond Sutra.

The word Prajñāpāramitā combines the Sanskrit words prajñā "wisdom" (or "knowledge") with pāramitā, "excellence," "perfection," "noble character quality," or "that which has gone beyond," "gone to the other side," "transcending." Prajñāpāramitā is a central concept in Mahāyāna Buddhism and is generally associated with ideas such as emptiness (śūnyatā), 'lack of svabhāva' (essence), the illusory (māyā) nature of things, how all phenomena are characterized by "non-arising" (anutpāda, i.e. unborn) and the Madhyamaka thought of Nāgārjuna. Its practice and understanding are taken to be indispensable elements of the Bodhisattva path.

According to Edward Conze, the Prajñāpāramitā Sūtras are "a collection of about forty texts ... composed somewhere on the Indian subcontinent between approximately 100 BC and AD 600." Some Prajnāpāramitā sūtras are thought to be among the earliest Mahāyāna sūtras.

== History ==
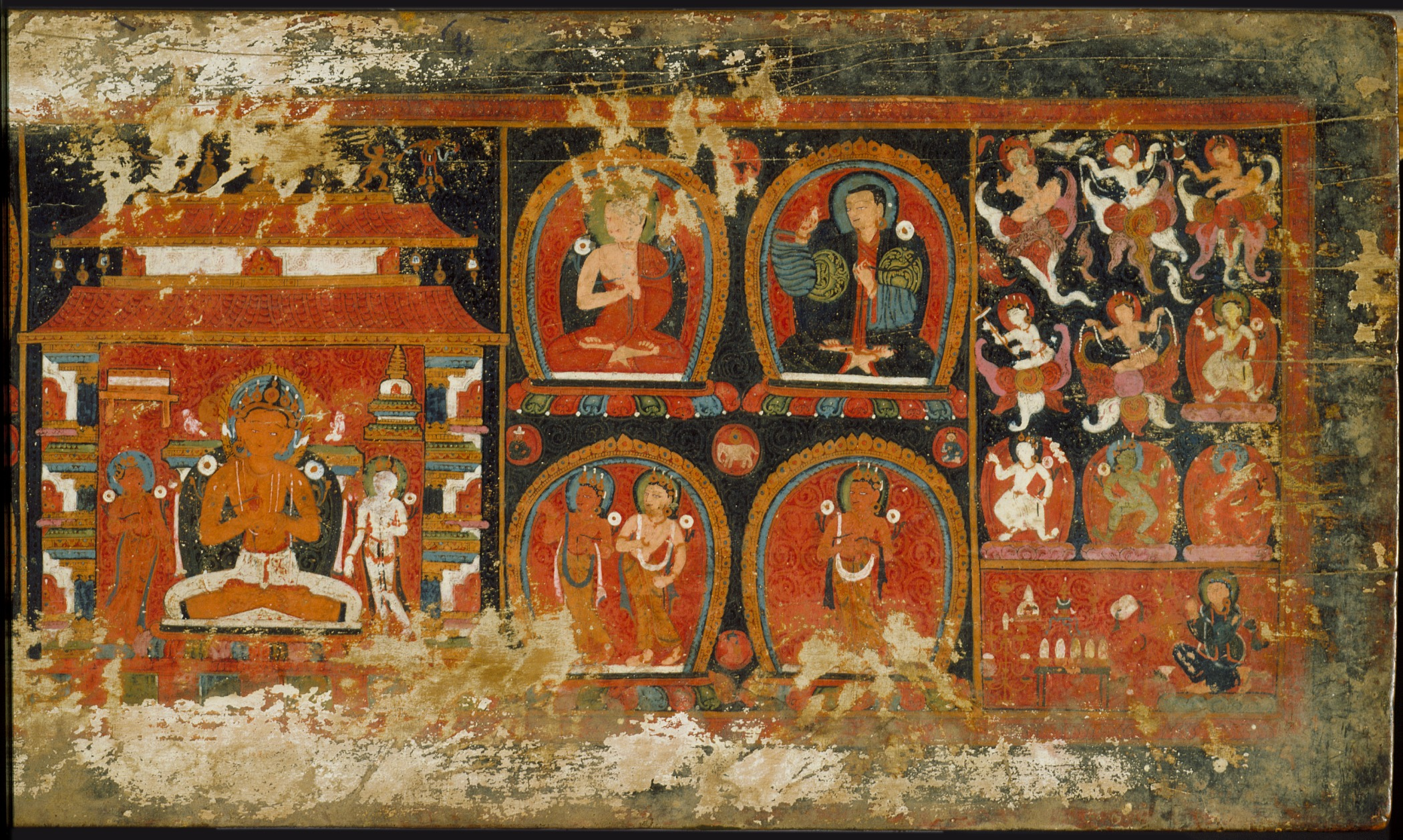
Prajñāpāramitā illustrated manuscript cover, circa 15th century

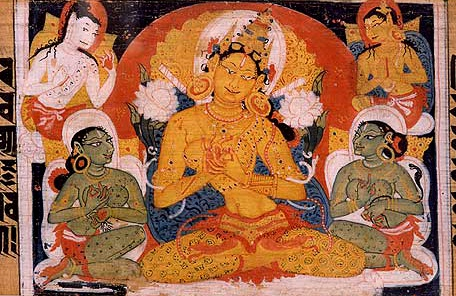
Prajñāpāramitā personified. From the Aṣṭasāhasrikā Prajñāpāramitā Sūtra, a Sanskrit Manuscript of the 8,000 line PP sutra, Nalanda, Bihar, India. Circa 700–1100 CE.

=== Earliest texts ===
Western scholars have traditionally considered the earliest sūtra in the Prajñāpāramitā class to be the Aṣṭasāhasrikā Prajñāpāramitā Sūtra or "Perfection of Wisdom in 8,000 Lines", which was probably put in writing in the 1st century BCE. This chronology is based on the views of Edward Conze, who largely considered dates of translation into other languages. This text also has a corresponding version in verse format, called the Ratnaguṇasaṃcaya Gāthā, which some believe to be slightly older because it is not written in standard literary Sanskrit. However, these findings rely on late-dating Indian texts, in which verses and mantras are often kept in more archaic forms.

According to Edward Conze, the PP literature developed in nine stages: (1) An urtext similar to the first two chapters of the Sanskrit Ratnagunasaṃcaya Gāthā; (2) Chapters 3 to 28 of the Ratnagunasaṃcaya are composed, along with the prose of the Aṣṭasāhasrikā. This base text was further expanded with (3) material from the Abhidharma, and (4) concessions to the "Buddhism of Faith" (referring to Pure Land references in the sūtra). This process led to (5) further expansion into larger PP sūtras as well as (6) contraction into the shorter sūtras (i.e. Diamond Sūtra, Heart Sūtra, down to the Prajñāpāramitā in One Letter). This expanded corpus formed the basis for the (7) Indian PP Commentaries, (8) Tantric PP works and (9) Chinese Chan texts. Jan Nattier also defends the view that the Aṣṭasāhasrikā developed as various layers were added over time. However, Matthew Orsborn has recently argued, based on the chiastic structures of the text that the entire sūtra may have been composed as a single whole (with a few additions added on the core chapters).

A number of scholars have proposed that the Mahāyāna Prajñāpāramitā teachings were first developed by the Caitika subsect of the Mahāsāṃghikas. They believe that the Aṣṭasāhasrikā Prajñāpāramitā Sūtra originated amongst the southern Mahāsāṃghika schools of the Āndhra region, along the Kṛṣṇa River. These Mahāsāṃghikas had two famous monasteries near Amarāvati Stupa and Dhānyakataka, which gave their names to the Pūrvaśaila and Aparaśaila schools. Each of these schools had a copy of the Aṣṭasāhasrikā Prajñāpāramitā Sūtra in Prakrit. Guang Xing also assesses the view of the Buddha given in the Aṣṭasāhasrikā Prajñāpāramitā Sūtra as being that of the Mahāsāṃghikas. Edward Conze estimates that this sūtra originated around 100 BCE.

In 2012, Harry Falk and Seishi Karashima published a damaged and partial Kharoṣṭhī manuscript of the Aṣṭasāhasrikā Prajñāpāramitā. It is very similar to the first Chinese translation of the Aṣṭasāhasrikā by Lokakṣema (ca. 179 CE) whose source text is sometimes assumed to be in the Gāndhārī language, although this is debated; Lokakṣema's translation is also the first extant translation of the Prajñāpāramitā genre into a non-Indic language. The "Split" manuscript is evidently a copy of an earlier text, which according to the radiocarbon dating reported by Falk dates to the 1st or early 2nd century.

In contrast to western scholarship, Japanese scholars have traditionally considered the Diamond Sūtra (Vajracchedikā Prajñāpāramitā Sūtra) to be from a very early date in the development of Prajñāpāramitā literature. The usual reason for this relative chronology which places the Vajracchedikā earlier is not its date of translation, but rather a comparison of the contents and themes. Some western scholars also believe that the Aṣṭasāhasrikā Prajñāpāramitā Sūtra was adapted from the earlier Vajracchedikā Prajñāpāramitā Sūtra.

Examining the language and phrases used in both the Aṣṭasāhasrikā and the Vajracchedikā, Gregory Schopen also sees the Vajracchedikā as being earlier than the Aṣṭasāhasrikā. This view is taken in part by examining parallels between the two works, in which the Aṣṭasāhasrikā seems to represent the later or more developed position. According to Schopen, these works also show a shift in emphasis from an oral tradition (Vajracchedikā) to a written tradition (Aṣṭasāhasrikā).

In an Encyclopedia article on the topic of Prajñāpāramitā literature published in 2015, however, Zacchetti reports that that the research conclusions proposed by Kajiyoshi have by now been generally accepted. Kajiyoshi identified the first chapter of the Aṣṭasāhasrikā as the starting point leading to a process of textual expansion and subsequent contraction responsible for the extant form of the Aṣṭasāhasrikā and the subsequent emergence of the different members of the Prajñāpāramitā textual family.

=== Larger Prajñāpāramitā sutras ===
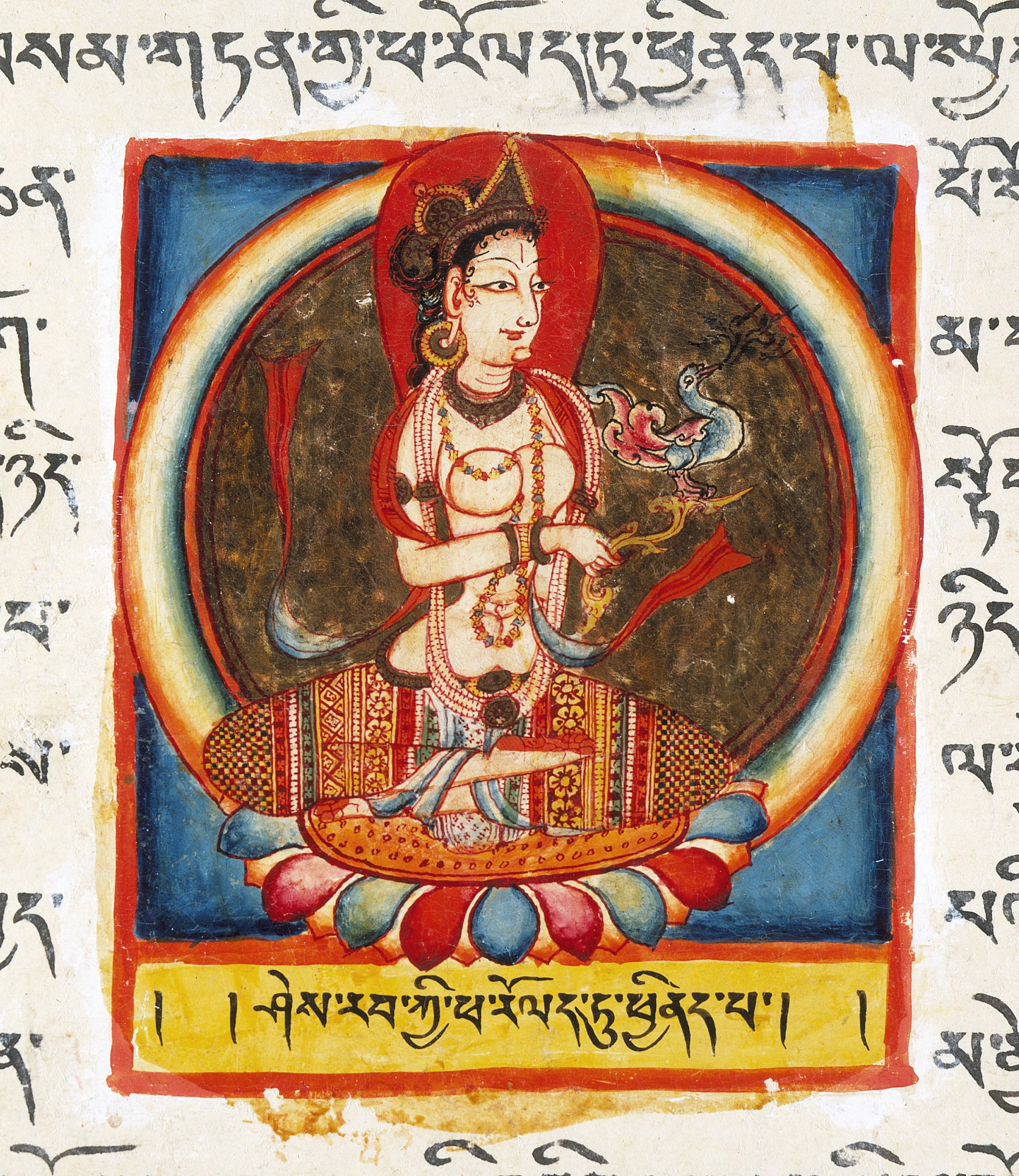
Illustration from a 100,000 line PP sutra manuscript

The Pañcaviṃśatisāhasrikā prajñāpāramitā Sūtra (T. Shes rab kyi pha rol tu phyin pa stong phrag nyi shu lnga pa; C. Mohe bore boluomi jing, 摩訶般若波羅蜜經) is one of the largest PP sutras, comprising three volumes of the Tibetan Kangyur (26-28). It was also one of the most important and popular PP sutras in India, seeing as how there are numerous Indian commentaries on this text, including commentaries by Vimuktisena, Haribhadra, Smṛtijñānakīrti, and Ratnakarashanti. The sutra also survives in the original Sanskrit, which was found in Gilgit. It also exists in four Chinese translations.

According to Nattier, the Pañcaviṃśatisāhasrikā is basically the Aṣṭasāhasrikā base text which has been "sliced" up and filled with other material, increasing the length of the text considerably. This process of expansion continued, culminating in the massive Śatasāhasrikā Prajñāpāramitā Sūtra (100,000 lines), the largest of the PP sutras.

According to Joseph Walser, there is evidence that the Pañcaviṃśatisāhasrikā Prajñāpāramitā Sūtra (25,000 lines) and the Śatasāhasrikā Prajñāpāramitā Sūtra (100,000 lines) have a connection with the Dharmaguptaka sect, while the Aṣṭasāhasrikā Prajñāpāramitā Sūtra (8,000 lines) does not.

Other PP texts were also composed which were much shorter and had a more independent structure from the Aṣṭasāhasrikā. Regarding the shorter PP texts, Conze writes, "two of these, the Diamond Sūtra and the Heart Sūtra are in a class by themselves and deservedly renowned throughout the world of Northern Buddhism. Both have been translated into many languages and have often been commented upon.". Jan Nattier argues the Heart Sutra to be an apocryphal text composed in China from extracts of the Pañcaviṃśatisāhasrikā and other texts c. 7th century. Red Pine, however, does not support Nattiers argument and believes the Heart Sutra to be of Indian origin.

=== Esoteric Prajñāpāramitā texts ===
During the later phase of Indian Buddhism, Tāntric Prajñāpāramitā texts were produced from the 8th century up to the 11th century CE. These later esoteric Prajñāpāramitā sutras are generally short texts which contain mantras and/or dhāraṇīs and also reference esoteric Buddhist (Mantrayana) ideas. They often promote simple practices based on recitation which lead to the accumulation of merit and help one reach awakening.

Esoteric Prajñāpāramitā sutras include texts such as the Adhyardhaśatikā Prajñāpāramitā Sūtra (150 lines), the famous Heart Sutra (Prajñāpāramitāhṛdaya), the Ekaślokikā prajñāpāramitā, Svalpākṣarā Prajñāpāramitā, Kauśikā Prajñāpāramitā, Saptaślokikā Prajñāpāramitā, the *Prajñāpāramitānāmāṣṭaśataka and the Candragarbha Prajñāpāramitā. Some of these sources, like the Svalpākṣarā, claim that simply reciting the dharanis found in the sutras are as beneficial as advanced esoteric Buddhist practices (with the full ritual panoply of mandalas and abhiseka). These scriptures may have been recited in esoteric rituals and two of them remain in widespread use today: Prajñāpāramitāhṛdaya (commonly recited throughout Asia by Buddhists) and the Adhyardhaśatikā (an widely recited text in Shingon Buddhism).

=== Prajñāpāramitā in Central Asia ===
By the middle of the 3rd century CE, it appears that some Prajñāpāramitā texts were known in Central Asia, as reported by the Chinese monk Zhu Zixing, who brought back a manuscript of the Prajñāpāramitā of 25,000 lines:

When in 260 AD, the Chinese monk Zhu Zixing chose to go to Khotan in an attempt to find original Sanskrit sūtras, he succeeded in locating the Sanskrit Prajñāpāramitā in 25,000 verses, and tried to send it to China. In Khotan, however, there were numerous Hīnayānists who attempted to prevent it because they regarded the text as heterodox. Eventually, Zhu Zixing stayed in Khotan, but sent the manuscript to Luoyang where it was translated by a Khotanese monk named Mokṣala. In 296, the Khotanese monk Gītamitra came to Chang'an with another copy of the same text.

=== China ===
In China, there was extensive translation of many Prajñāpāramitā texts beginning in the second century CE. The main translators include: Lokakṣema (支婁迦讖), Zhī Qīan (支謙), Dharmarakṣa (竺法護), Mokṣala (無叉羅), Kumārajīva (鳩摩羅什, 408 CE), Xuánzàng (玄奘), Făxián (法賢) and Dānapāla (施護). These translations were very influential in the development of East Asian Mādhyamaka and on Chinese Buddhism.

Xuanzang (fl. c. 602–664) was a Chinese scholar who traveled to India and returned to China with three copies of the Mahāprajñāpāramitā Sūtra which he had secured from his extensive travels. Xuanzang, with a team of disciple translators, commenced translating the voluminous work in 660 CE using the three versions to ensure the integrity of the source documentation. Xuanzang was being encouraged by a number of the disciple translators to render an abridged version. After a suite of dreams quickened his decision, Xuanzang determined to render an unabridged, complete volume, faithful to the original of 600 fascicles.

An important PP text in East Asian Buddhism is the Dazhidulun (大智度論, T no. 1509), a massive commentary on the Pañcaviṃśatisāhasrikā Prajñāpāramitā translated by Kumārajīva (344–413 CE). There are also later commentaries from Zen Buddhists on the Heart and Diamond sutra and Kūkai's commentary (9th century) is the first-known Tantric commentary.

=== Tibet ===
The PP sutras were first brought to Tibet in the reign of Trisong Detsen (742-796) by scholars Jinamitra and Silendrabodhi and the translator Ye shes De. Tibetan Buddhist scholasticism generally studies the PP sutras through the Abhisamayālaṅkāra and its numerous commentaries. The focus on the Abhisamayālaṅkāra is particularly pronounced in the Gelug school, who according to Georges Dreyfus "take the Ornament as the central text for the study of the path" and "treat it as a kind of Buddhist encyclopedia, read in the light of commentaries by Je Dzong-ka-ba, Gyel-tsap Je, and the authors of manuals [monastic textbooks]."

== Texts ==
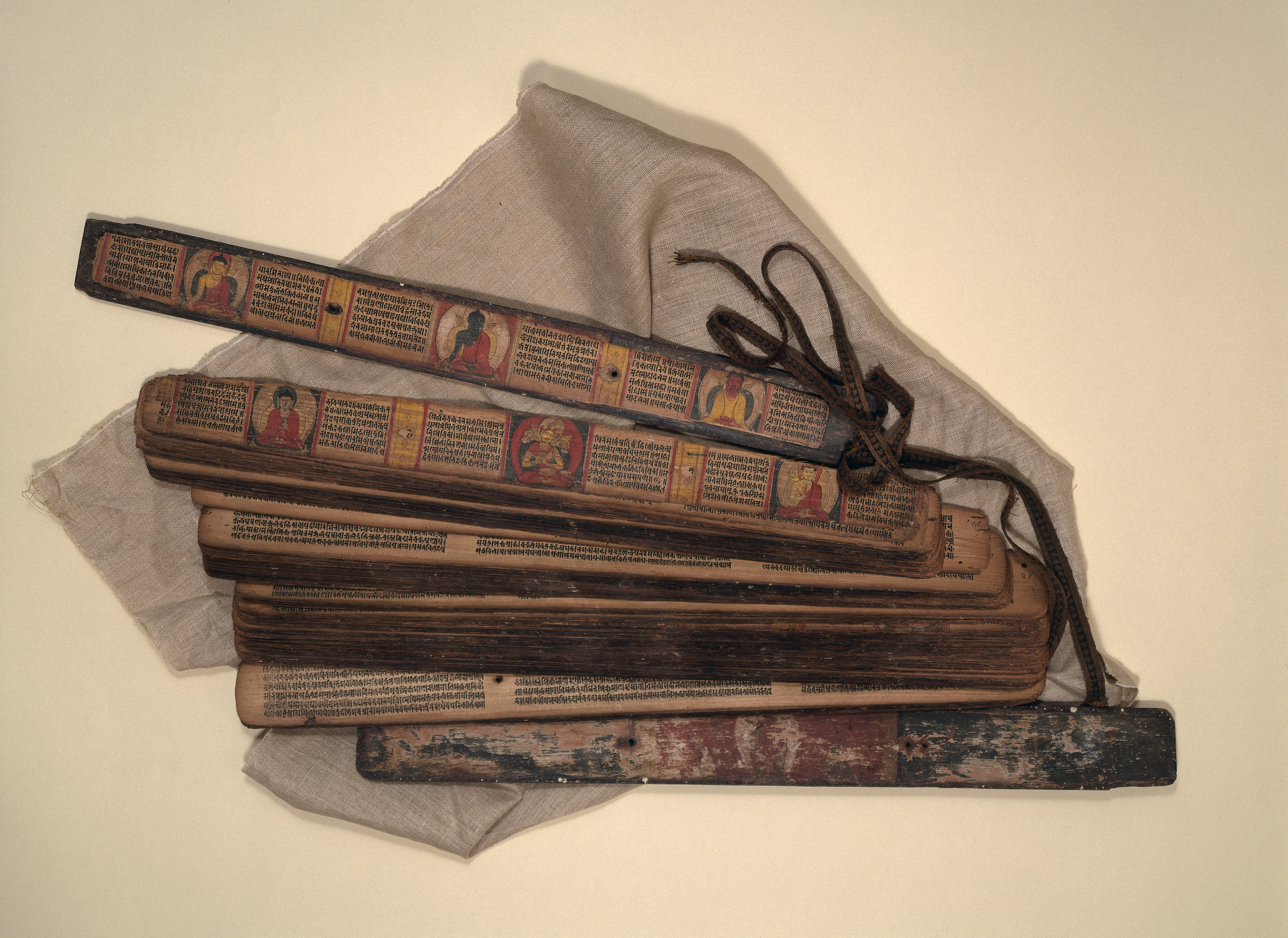
Manuscript of the Perfection of Wisdom in 8,000 lines

=== The Main Prajñāpāramitā Sūtras ===
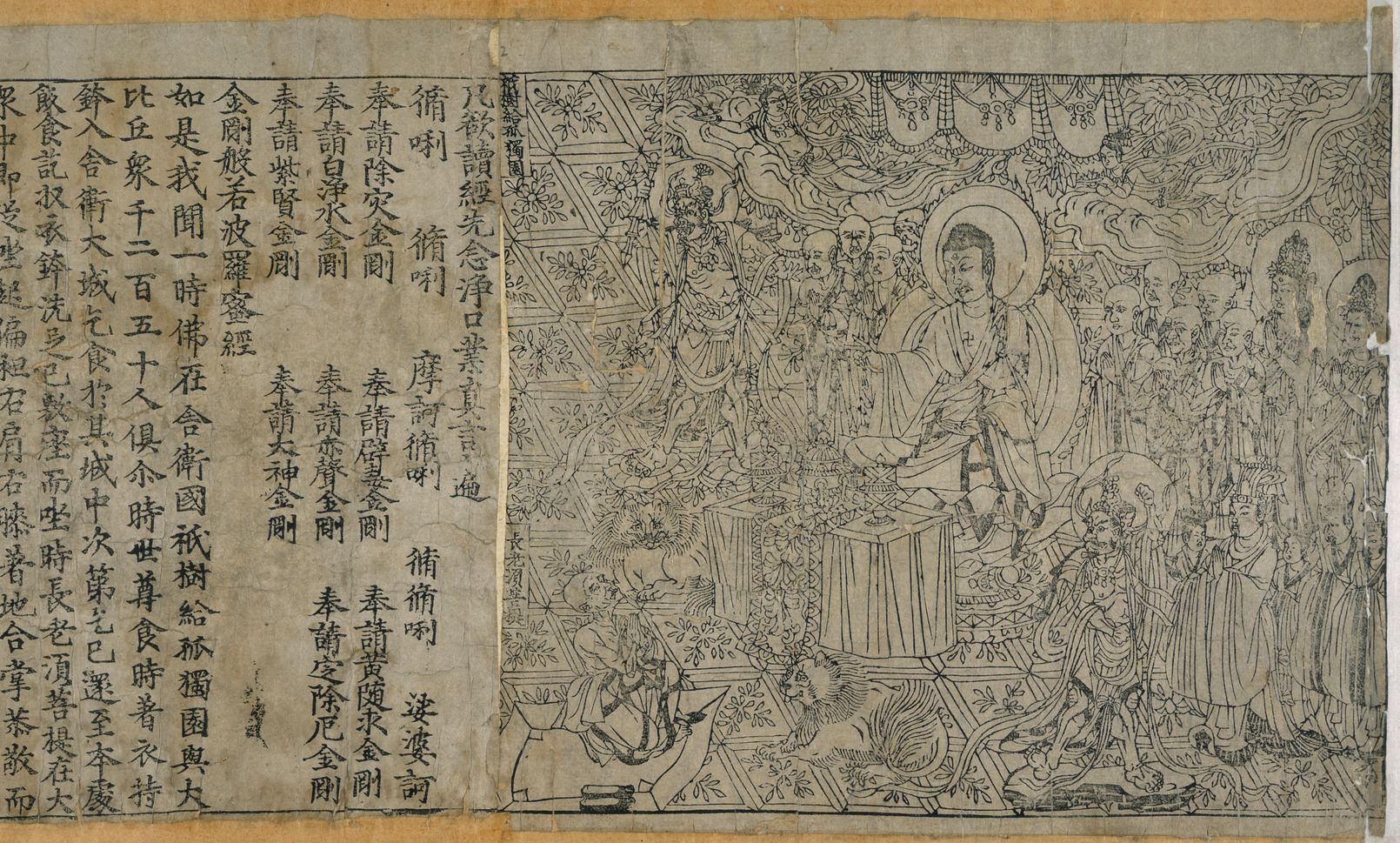
The world's earliest printed book is a Chinese translation of the Vajracchedikā Prajñāpāramitā Sūtra (Vajra Cutter Sutra) from Dunhuang (circa 868 CE).

An Indian commentary on the Mahāyānasaṃgraha, entitled Vivṛtaguhyārthapiṇḍavyākhyā (A Condensed Explanation of the Revealed Secret Meaning, Derge No. 4052), lists eight Prajñāpāramitā sūtras which were "taught to bodhisattvas" and are seen as superior (from the Sravakayana sutras) because they are superior "in eliminating conceptually imaged forms".

The eight texts are listed according to length and are the following:

1. Triśatikā Prajñāpāramitā Sūtra: 300 lines, alternatively known as the Vajracchedikā Prajñāpāramitā Sūtra (Diamond Sūtra)
2. Pañcaśatikā Prajñāpāramitā Sūtra: 500 lines
3. Saptaśatikā Prajñāpāramitā Sūtra: 700 lines, the bodhisattva Mañjuśrī's exposition of Prajñāpāramitā
4. Sārdhadvisāhasrikā Prajñāpāramitā Sūtra: 2,500 lines, from the questions of Suvikrāntavikrāmin Bodhisattva
5. Aṣṭasāhasrikā Prajñāpāramitā Sūtra: 8,000 lines
6. Aṣṭadaśasāhasrikā Prajñāpāramitā Sūtra: 18,000 lines
7. Pañcaviṃśatisāhasrikā Prajñāpāramitā Sūtra: 25,000 lines.
8. Śatasāhasrikā Prajñāpāramitā Sūtra: 100,000 lines.

=== Xuanzang's Prajñāpāramitā Library ===
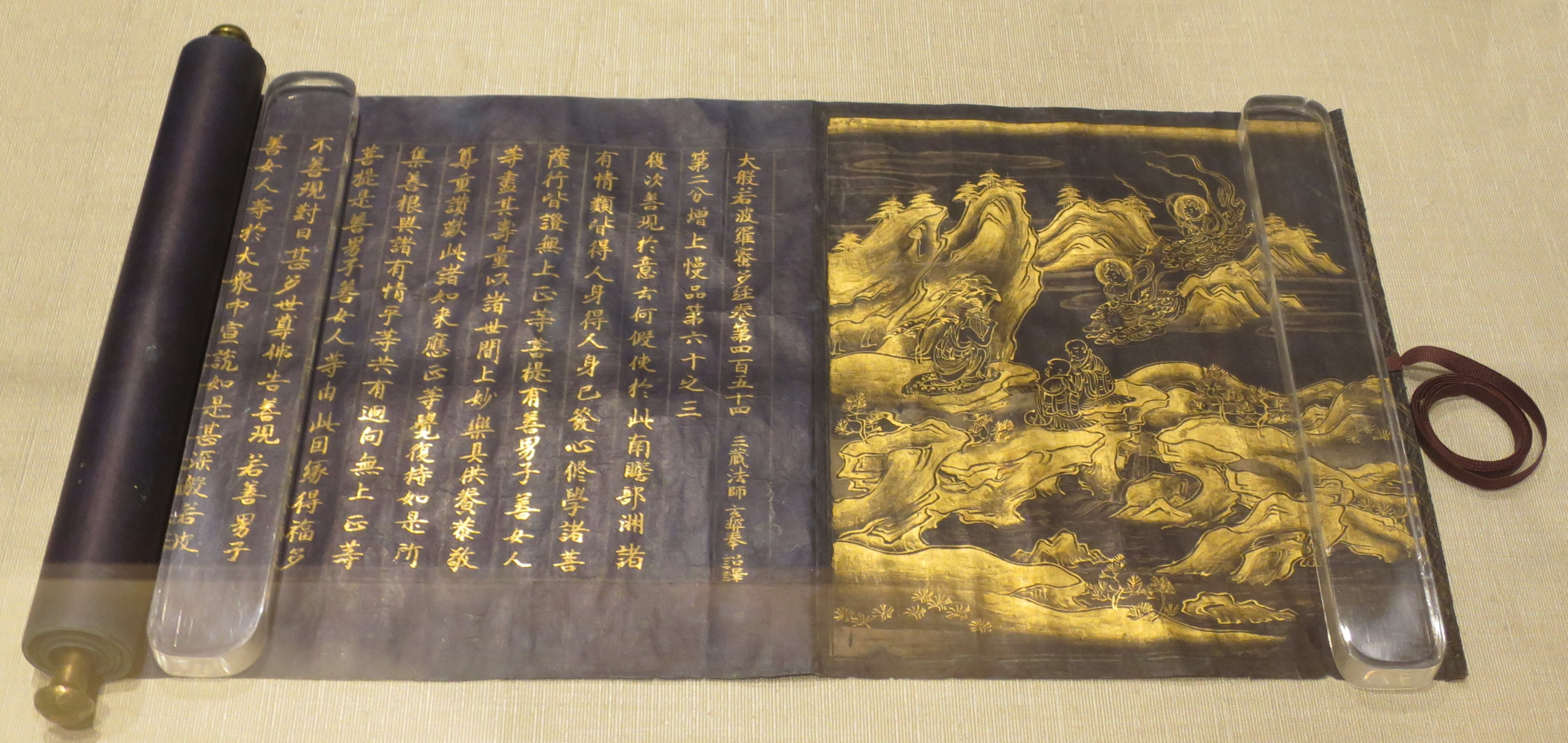
Illustrated frontispiece to the Great Perfection of Wisdom Sutra, Japan, Heian period, late 12th century, handscroll, gold on blue paper, Honolulu Museum of Art

The Chinese scholar and translator Xuanzang (玄奘, 602-664) is known for his translation of a massive Sanskrit collection of Prajñāpāramitā sutras called "the Xuánzàng Prajñāpāramitā Library" or "The Great Prajñāpāramitāsūtra" (般若 波羅蜜 多 經, pinyin: bōrě bōluómì duō jīng).

Xuanzang returned to China with three copies of this Sanskrit work which he obtained in South India and his translation is said to have been based on these three sources. In total it includes 600 scrolls, with 5 million Chinese characters.

This collection consists of 16 Prajñāpāramitā texts:

- Prajñāpāramitā sūtra in 100,000 verses (scrolls 1-400)
- Prajñāpāramitā sūtra in 25,000 verses (scrolls 401-478)
- Prajñāpāramitā sūtra in 18,000 verses (scrolls 479-537)
- Prajñāpāramitā sutra in 8,000 verses (scrolls 538-555)
- An abridged version of the Prajñāpāramitā sūtra in 8,000 verses (scrolls 556-565)
- Devarājapravara prajñāpāramitā sūtra - a part of the Questions of Suvikrānta (scrolls 566-573)
- Prajñāpāramitā sūtra in 700 verses (scrolls 574-575)
- Nāgaśripa-priccha Prajñāpāramitā (scroll 576)
- The Diamond Sutra (scroll 577)
- Prajñāpāramitā sūtra in 150 verses (scroll 578)
- Ārya pañcapāramitānirdeśa nāma mahāyāna sūtra (bokrull 579-592)
- The Questions of Suvikrānta (scroll 593-600)

A modern English translation: The Great Prajna Paramita Sutra (vols. 1 to 13) translated by Naichen Chen (Tucson: Wheatmark).

=== In the Tibetan Kangyur ===
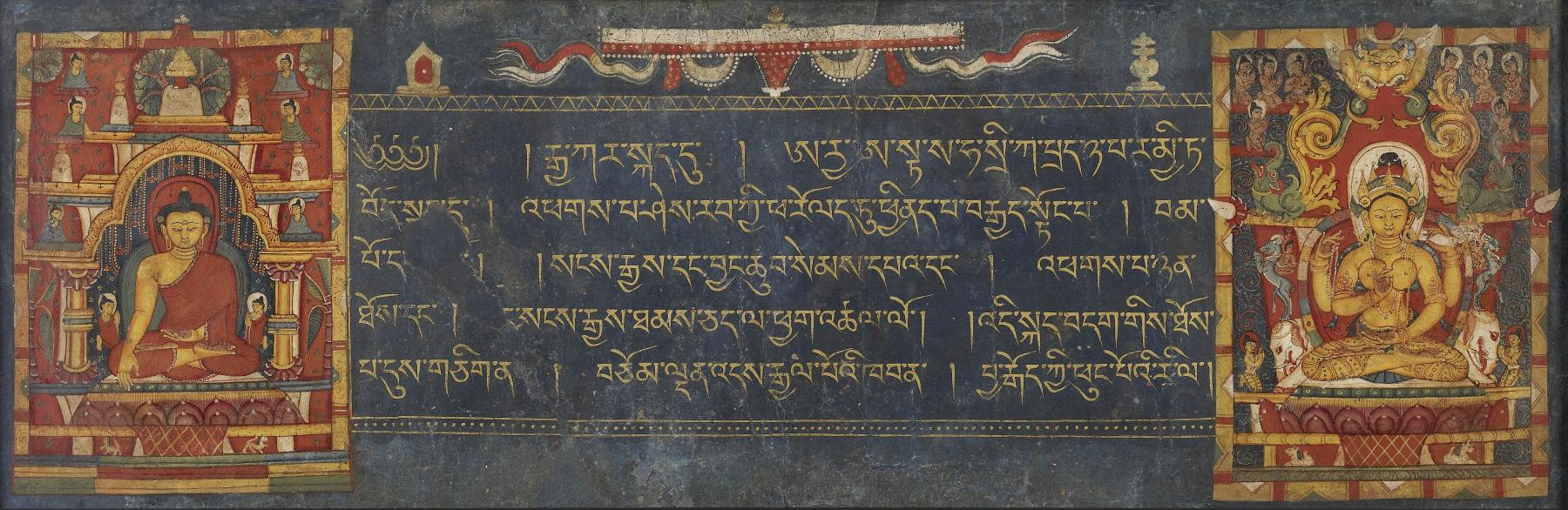
Tibetan prajñāpāramitā manuscript depicting Sakyamuni Buddha and Prajñāpāramitā devi, 13th century

In the Tibetan Buddhist tradition, the Abhisamayālaṅkāra is traditionally said to be a commentary to seventeen Prajñāpāramitā (PP) source texts. These are seen as the most important PP sutras and they collectively known as the "Seventeen Mothers and Sons" (Wyl. yum sras bcu bdun).

The Six Mothers are:

1. The Perfection of Wisdom in One Hundred Thousand Lines (Sanskrit: śatasāhasrikāprajñāpāramitā, Wylie: sher phyin stong phrag brgya pa/ \('bum/\)), Tohoku (Toh) Catalogue # 8.
2. The Perfection of Wisdom in Twenty-five Thousand Lines (Pañcaviṃśatisāhasrikāprajñāpāramitā, sher phyin stong phrag nyi shu lnga pa/ \(nyi khri/\)), Toh 9.
3. The Perfection of Wisdom in Eighteen Thousand Lines (Aṣṭādaśasāhasrikāprajñāpāramitā, sher phyin khri brgyad stong pa), Toh 10.
4. The Transcendent Perfection of Wisdom in Ten Thousand Lines (Daśasāhasrikāprajñāpāramitā, shes phyin khri pa), Toh 11.
5. The Perfection of Wisdom in Eight Thousand Lines (Aṣṭasāhasrikāprajñāpāramitā, sher phyin brgyad stong pa/), Toh 12.
6. The Verses that Summarize the Perfection of Wisdom (Prajñāpāramitāsaṃcayagāthā, shes rab kyi pha rol tu phyin pa sdud pa tshigs su), Toh 13.

The Eleven Sons are:

1. The Perfection of Wisdom in Seven Hundred Lines (saptaśatikāprajñāpāramitā), Toh 24.
2. The Perfection of Wisdom in Five Hundred Lines (pañcaśatikāprajñāpāramitā), Toh 15.
3. The Illustrious Perfection of Wisdom in Fifty Lines (bhagavatīprajñāpāramitāpañcāśatikā), Toh 18.
4. The Principles of the Perfection of Wisdom in One Hundred and Fifty Lines (prajñāpāramitānayaśatapañcaśatikā), Toh 17.
5. The Twenty-five Entrances to the Perfection of Wisdom (pañcaviṃśatikāprajñāpāramitāmukha), Toh 20.
6. The Perfection of Wisdom in a Few Syllables (svalpākṣaraprajñāpāramitā), Toh 22.
7. The Perfection of Wisdom Mother in One Syllable (ekākṣarīmātāprajñāpāramitā), Toh 23.
8. The Perfection of Wisdom for Kauśika (kauśikaprajñāpāramitā), Toh 19
9. The Perfection of Wisdom Teachings “The Questions of Suvikrāntavikrāmin” (suvikrāntavikrāmiparipṛcchāprajñāpāramitānirdeśa), Toh 14.
10. The Sūtra on the Perfection of Wisdom "The Diamond Cutter" (vajracchedikā), Toh 16.
11. The Heart of the Perfection of Wisdom, the Blessed Mother (Bhagavatīprajñāpāramitāhṛdaya), Toh 21.

In the Prajñāpāramitā section of the Kangyur, there are also other Prajñāpāramitā sutras besides the seventeen Mothers and Sons:

- The Hundred and Eight Names of the Perfection of Wisdom (prajñāpāramitānāmāṣṭaśataka), Toh 25.
- The Perfection of Wisdom for Sūryagarbha (sūryagarbhaprajñāpāramitā), Toh 26.
- The Perfection of Wisdom for Candragarbha (candragarbhaprajñāpāramitā), Toh 27.
- The Perfection of Wisdom for Samantabhadra (samantabhadraprajñāpāramitā), Toh 28.
- The Perfection of Wisdom for Vajrapāṇi (vajrapāṇiprajñāpāramitā), Toh 29.
- The Perfection of Wisdom for Vajraketu (vajraketuprajñāpāramitā), Toh 30.

=== Commentaries ===
There are various Indian and later Chinese commentaries on the Prajñāpāramitā sutras, some of the most influential commentaries include:

- Mahāprajñāpāramitopadeśa (大智度論, T no. 1509) a massive and encyclopedic text translated into Chinese by the Buddhist scholar Kumārajīva (344–413 CE). It is a commentary on the Pañcaviṃśatisāhasrikā Prajñāpāramitā. This text claims to be from the Buddhist philosopher Nagarjuna (c. 2nd century) in the colophon, but various scholars such as Étienne Lamotte have questioned this attribution. This work was translated by Lamotte as Le Traité de la Grande Vertu de Sagesse and into English from the French by Gelongma Karma Migme Chodron.
- Abhisamayālaṅkāra (Ornament of clear realization), the central Prajñāpāramitā shastra in the Tibetan tradition. It is traditionally attributed as a revelation from the Bodhisattva Maitreya to the scholar Asanga (fl. 4th century CE), known as a master of the Yogachara school. The Indian commentary on this text by Haribadra, the Abhisamayalankaraloka, has also been influential on later Tibetan texts. There is also another Indian commentary to the AA by Vimuktisena.
- Śatasāhasrikā-pañcaviṃśatisāhasrikāṣṭādaśasāhasrikā-prajñāpāramitā-bṛhaṭṭīkā, often attributed to Vasubandhu (4th century).
- Satasahasrika-paramita-brhattika, attributed to Daṃṣṭrāsena.
- Dignāga's Prajnaparamitarthasamgraha-karika.
- Ratnākaraśānti's Prajñāpāramitopadeśa.

== Themes in Prajñāpāramitā sutras ==
=== Core themes ===
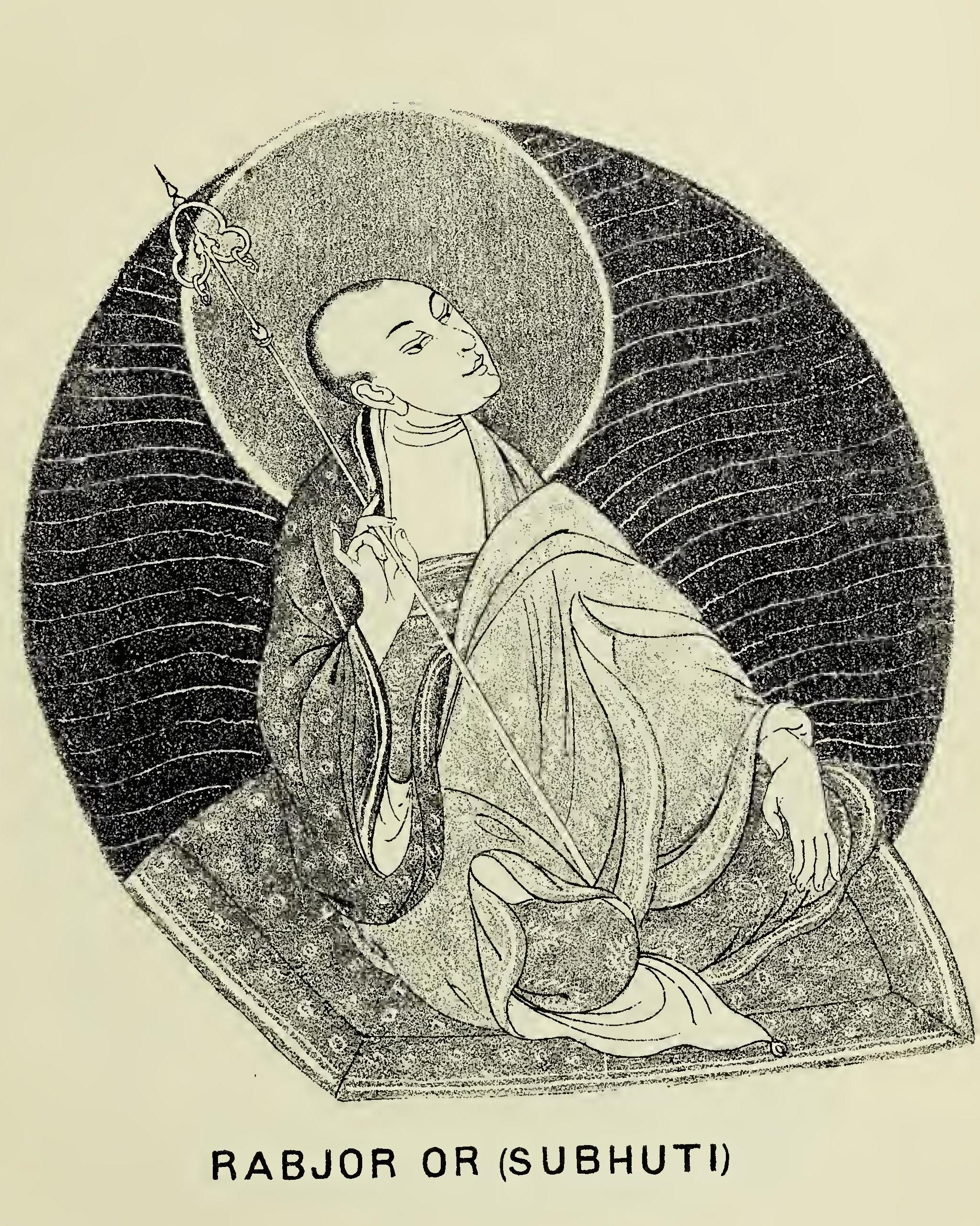
A Tibetan illustration of Subhuti (Tib. Rabjor), a major character in the Prajñāpāramitā literature, who is proclaimed as the foremost "dweller in non-conflict" (araṇavihārīnaṃ) and "of those worthy of offering" (dakkhiṇeyyānaṃ)

==== The Bodhisattva and Prajñāpāramitā ====
A key theme of the Prajñāpāramitā sutras is the figure of the Bodhisattva (literally: awakening-being) which is defined in the 8,000-line Prajñāpāramitā sutra as:

"One who trains in all dharmas [phenomena] without obstruction [asakti, asaktatā], and also knows all dharmas as they really are."

A Bodhisattva is then a being that experiences everything "without attachment" (asakti) and sees reality or suchness (Tathātā) as it is. The Bodhisattva is the main ideal in Mahayana (Great Vehicle), which sees the goal of the Buddhist path as becoming a Buddha for the sake of all sentient beings, not just yourself:

They make up their minds that 'one single self we shall tame ... one single self we shall lead to final Nirvana.'
A Bodhisattva should certainly not in such a way train himself.
On the contrary, he should train himself thus: "My own self I will place in Suchness [the true way of things], and, so that all the world might be helped,
I will place all beings into Suchness, and I will lead to Nirvana the whole immeasurable world of beings."

A central quality of the Bodhisattva is their practice of Prajñāpāramitā, a most deep (gambhīra) state of knowledge which is an understanding of reality arising from analysis as well as meditative insight. It is non-conceptual and non-dual (advaya) as well as transcendental. Literally, the term could be translated as "knowledge gone to the other (shore)", or transcendental knowledge. The Aṣṭasāhasrikā Prajñāpāramitā Sūtra says:

This is known as the Prajñāpāramitā of the bodhisattvas; not grasping at form, not grasping at sensation, perception, volitions and cognition.

A further passage in the 8,000-line Prajñāpāramitā sutra states that Prajñāpāramitā means that a Bodhisattva stands in emptiness (shunyata) by not standing (√sthā) or supporting themselves on any dharma (phenomena), whether conditioned or unconditioned. The dharmas that a Bodhisattva does "not stand" on include standard listings such as: the five aggregates, the sense fields (ayatana), nirvana, Buddhahood, etc. This is explained by stating that Bodhisattvas "wander without a home" (aniketacārī); "home" or "abode" meaning signs (nimitta, meaning a subjective mental impression) of sensory objects and the afflictions that arise dependent on them. This includes the absence, the "not taking up" (aparigṛhīta) of even "correct" mental signs and perceptions such as "form is not self", "I practice Prajñāpāramitā", etc. To be freed of all constructions and signs, to be signless (animitta) is to be empty of them and this is to stand in Prajñāpāramitā. The Prajñāpāramitā sutras state that all Buddhas and Bodhisattvas in the past have practiced Prajñāpāramitā. Prajñāpāramitā is also associated with Sarvajñata (all-knowledge) in the Prajñāpāramitā sutras, a quality of the mind of a Buddha which knows the nature of all dharmas.

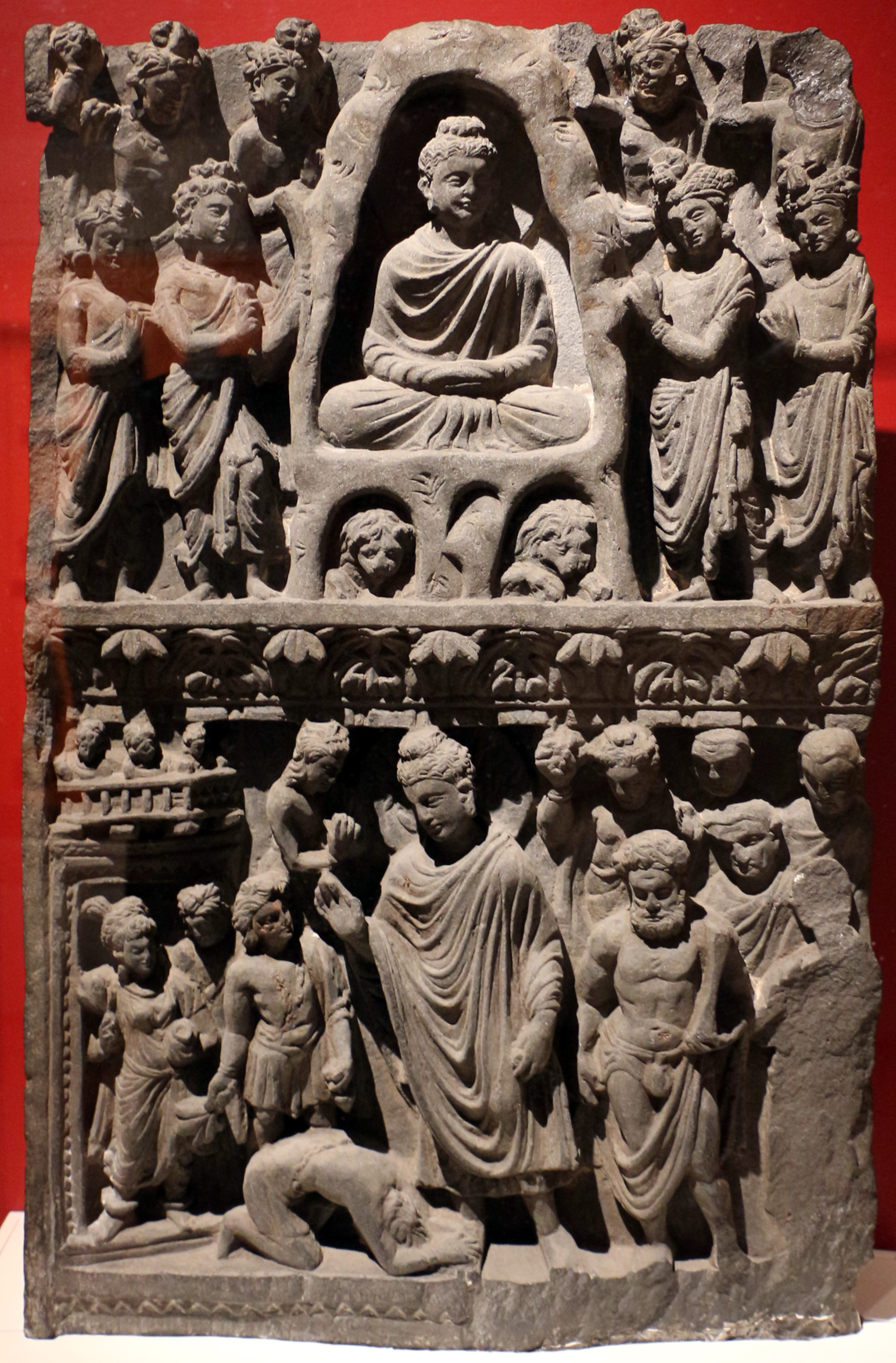
Gandharan depiction of the Bodhisattva (the future Buddha Shakyamuni) prostrating at the feet of the past Buddha Dipankara

According to Karl Brunnhölzl, Prajñāpāramitā means that "all phenomena from form up through omniscience being utterly devoid of any intrinsic characteristics or nature of their own." Furthermore, "such omniscient wisdom is always nonconceptual and free from reference points since it is the constant and panoramic awareness of the nature of all phenomena and does not involve any shift between meditative equipoise and subsequent attainment."

Edward Conze outlined several psychological qualities of a Bodhisattva's practice of Prajñāpāramitā:

- Non-apprehension (anupalabdhi)
- No settling down or "non-attachment" (anabhinivesa)
- No attainment (aprapti). No person can "have," or "possess," or "acquire," or "gain" any dharma.
- Non-reliance on any dharma, being unsupported, not leaning on any dharma.
- "Finally, one may say that the attitude of the perfected sage is one of non-assertion."

==== Other Bodhisattva qualities ====
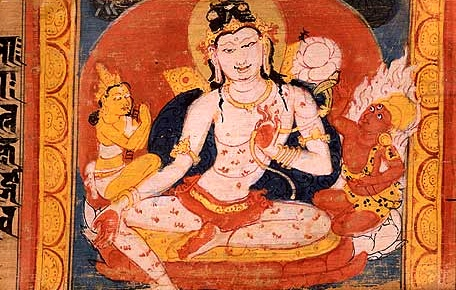
Avalokiteśvara. Aṣṭasāhasrikā Prajñāpāramitā Sūtra manuscript. Nālandā, Bihar, India.

The Prajñāpāramitā sutras also teach of the importance of the other pāramitās (perfections) for the Bodhisattva such as Ksanti (patience): "Without resort to this patience (kṣānti) they [bodhisattvas] cannot reach their respective goals".

Another quality of the Bodhisattva is their freedom from fear (na vtras) in the face of the seemingly shocking doctrine of the emptiness of all dharmas which includes their own existence. A good friend (kalyanamitra) is useful in the path to fearlessness. Bodhisattvas also have no pride or self-conception (na manyeta) of their own stature as Bodhisattvas. These are important features of the mind of a bodhisattva, called bodhicitta. The Prajñāpāramitā sutras also mention that bodhicitta is a middle way, it is neither apprehended as existent (astitā) or non-existent (nāstitā) and it is "immutable" (avikāra) and "free from conceptualization" (avikalpa).

The Bodhisattva is said to generate "great compassion" (maha-karuṇā) for all beings on their path to liberation and yet also maintain a sense of equanimity (upekṣā) and distance from them through their understanding of emptiness, due to which, the Bodhisattva knows that even after bringing countless beings to nirvana, "no living being whatsoever has been brought to nirvana." Bodhisattvas and Mahāsattvas are also willing to give up all of their meritorious deeds for sentient beings and develop skillful means (upaya) in order to help abandon false views and teach them the Dharma. The practice of Prajñāpāramitā allows a Bodhisattva to become:

"a saviour of the helpless, a defender of the defenceless, a refuge to those without refuge, a place to rest to those without resting place, the final relief of those who are without it, an island to those without one, a light to the blind, a guide to the guideless, a resort to those without one and....guide to the path those who have lost it, and you shall become a support to those who are without support."

==== Tathātā ====
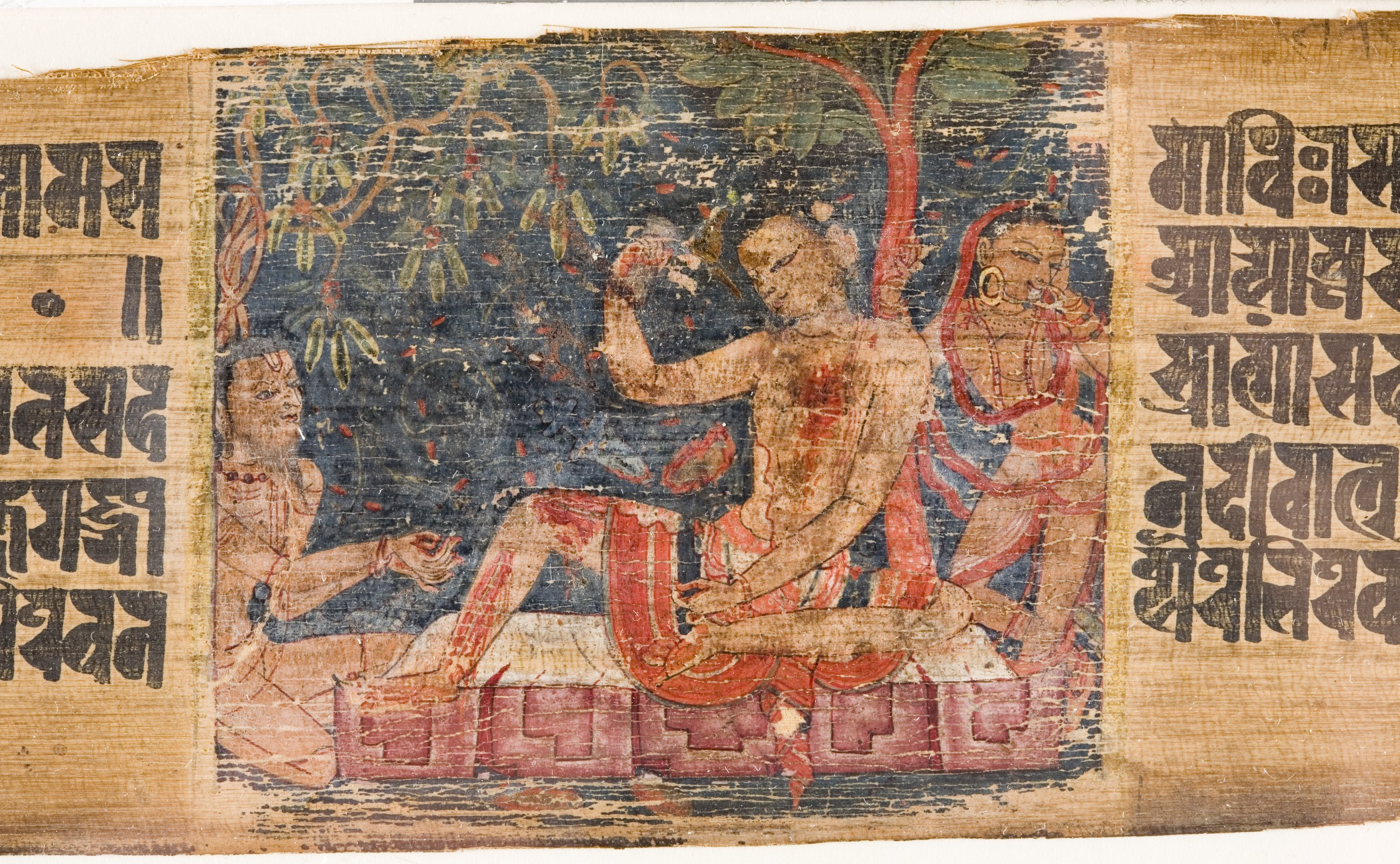
Illustration of Bodhisattva Sadāprarudita (Ever weeping), a character in the Aṣṭasāhasrikā Prajñāpāramitā Sūtra Avadana section, which is used by the Buddha as an exemplar of those who seek Prajñāpāramitā

Tathātā (Suchness or Thusness) and the related term Dharmatā (the nature of Dharma), and Tathāgata are also important terms of the Prajñāpāramitā texts. To practice Prajñāpāramitā means to practice in accord with 'the nature of Dharma' and to see the Tathāgata (i.e. the Buddha). As the Aṣṭasāhasrikā Prajñāpāramitā Sūtra states, these terms are generally used equivalently: "As the suchness (tathatā) of dharmas is immovable (acalitā), and the suchness (tathatā) of dharmas is the Tathāgata." The Tathāgata is said in the Aṣṭasāhasrikā Prajñāpāramitā Sūtra to "neither come nor go". Furthermore, the Aṣṭasāhasrikā Prajñāpāramitā Sūtra includes a list of synonyms associated with Tathāgata as also being "beyond coming and going", these include: 1. Suchness (tathatā); 2. Unarisen (anutpāda); 3. Reality limit (bhūtakoṭi); 4. Emptiness ("Śūnyatā"); 5. Division (yathāvatta); 6. Detachment (virāga); 7. Cessation (nirodha); 8. Space element (ākāśadhātu). The sutra then states:

Apart from these dharmas, there is no Tathāgata. The suchness of these dharmas, and the suchness of the Tathāgatas, is all one single suchness (ekaivaiṣā tathatā), not two, not divided (dvaidhīkāraḥ). ... beyond all classification (gaṇanāvyativṛttā), due to non-existence (asattvāt).

Suchness then does not come or go because like the other terms, it is not a real entity (bhūta, svabhāva), but merely appears conceptually through dependent origination, like a dream or an illusion.

Edward Conze lists six ways in which the ontological status of dharmas is considered by the Prajñāpāramitā:

1. Dharmas are non-existent because they have no own-being (svabhava).
2. Dharmas have a purely nominal existence. They are mere words, a matter of conventional expression.
3. Dharmas are "without marks, with one mark only, ie., with no mark." A mark (laksana) being a distinctive property which separates it from other dharmas.
4. Dharmas are isolated (vivikta), absolutely isolated (atyantavivikta).
5. Dharmas have never been produced, never come into existence; they are not really ever brought forth, they are unborn (ajata).
6. Non-production is illustrated by a number of similes, i.e., dreams, magical illusions, echoes, reflected images, mirages, and space.

It is through seeing this Tathātā that one is said to have a vision of the Buddha (the Tathāgata), seeing this is called seeing the Buddha's Dharmakaya (Dharma body) which is a not his physical body, but none other than the true nature of dharmas.

==== Negation and emptiness ====
Most modern Buddhist scholars such as Lamotte, Conze and Yin Shun have seen Śūnyatā (emptiness, voidness, hollowness) as the central theme of the Prajñāpāramitā sutras. Edward Conze writes:

It is now the principal teaching of Prajñāpāramitā with regard to own-being that it is "empty." The Sanskrit term is svabhāva-śūnya. This is a tatpuruṣa compound (one in which the last member is qualified by the first without losing its grammatical independence), in which svabhava may have the sense of any oblique case. The Mahayana understands it to mean that dharmas are empty of any own-being, i.e., that they are not ultimate facts in their own right, but merely imagined and falsely discriminated, for each and every one of them is dependent on something other than itself. From a slightly different angle this means that dharmas, when viewed with perfected gnosis, reveal an own-being which is identical with emptiness, i.e in their own-being they are empty.

The Prajñāpāramitā sutras commonly use apophatic statements to express the nature of reality as seen by Prajñāpāramitā. A common trope in the Prajñāpāramitā sutras is the negation of a previous statement in the form 'A is not A, therefore it is A', or more often negating only a part of the statement as in, "XY is a Y-less XY". Japanese Buddhologist, Hajime Nakamura, calls this negation the 'logic of not' (na prthak). An example from the Diamond Sutra of this use of negation is:

As far as 'all dharmas' are concerned, Subhuti, all of them are dharma-less. That is why they are called 'all dharmas.'

The rationale behind this form is the juxtaposition of conventional truth with ultimate truth as taught in the Buddhist two truths doctrine. The negation of conventional truth is supposed to expound the ultimate truth of the emptiness (Śūnyatā) of all reality - the idea that nothing has an ontological essence and all things are merely conceptual, without substance.

The Prajñāpāramitā sutras state that dharmas should not be conceptualized either as existent, nor as non existent, and use negation to highlight this: "in the way in which dharmas exist (saṃvidyante), just so do they not exist (asaṃvidyante)".

==== Māyā ====
The Prajñāpāramitā sutras commonly state that all dharmas (phenomena), are in some way like an illusion (māyā), like a dream (svapna) and like a mirage. The Diamond Sutra states:

"A shooting star, a clouding of the sight, a lamp, An illusion, a drop of dew, a bubble, a dream, a lightning's flash, a thunder cloud—this is the way one should see the conditioned."

Even the highest Buddhist goals like Buddhahood and Nirvana are to be seen in this way, thus the highest wisdom or prajña is a type of spiritual knowledge which sees all things as illusory. As Subhuti in the Aṣṭasāhasrikā Prajñāpāramitā Sūtra states:

"Even if perchance there could be anything more distinguished, of that also I would say that it is like an illusion, like a dream. For not two different things are illusions and Nirvāṇa, are dreams and Nirvāṇa."

This is connected to the impermanence and insubstantial nature of dharmas. The Prajñāpāramitā sutras give the simile of a magician (māyākāra: 'illusion-maker') who, when seemingly killing his illusory persons by cutting off their heads, really kills nobody and compare it to the bringing of beings to awakening (by 'cutting off' the conceptualization of self view; Skt: ātmadṛṣṭi chindati) and the fact that this is also ultimately like an illusion, because their aggregates "are neither bound nor released". The illusion then, is the conceptualization and mental fabrication of dharmas as existing or not existing, as arising or not arising. Prajñāpāramitā sees through this illusion, being empty of concepts and fabrications.

Perceiving dharmas and beings like an illusion (māyādharmatā) is termed the "great armor" (mahāsaṃnaha) of the Bodhisattva, who is also termed the 'illusory man' (māyāpuruṣa).

=== Sutra worship ===
According to Paul Williams, another major theme of the Prajñāpāramitā sutras is "the phenomenon of laudatory self reference—the lengthy praise of the sutra itself, the immense merits to be obtained from treating even a verse of it with reverence, and the nasty penalties which will accrue in accordance with karma to those who denigrate the scripture."

=== Later developments ===
According to Edward Conze, later Prajñāpāramitā sutras added much new doctrinal material. Conze lists the later accretions as:

1. Increasing sectarianism, with all the rancor, invective and polemics that that implies
2. Increasing scholasticism and the insertion of longer and longer Abhidharma lists
3. Growing stress on skill in means, and on its subsidiaries such as the Bodhisattva's Vow and the four means of conversion, and its logical sequences, such as the distinction between provisional and ultimate truth
4. A growing concern with the Buddhist of faith, with its celestial Buddhas and Bodhisattva and their Buddha-fields;
5. A tendency towards verbosity, repetitiveness and overelaboration
6. Lamentations over the decline of the Dharma
7. Expositions of the hidden meaning which become the more frequent the more the original meaning becomes obscured
8. Any reference to the Dharma body of the Buddha as anything different from a term for the collection of his teachings
9. A more and more detailed doctrine of the graded stages (bhūmi) of a Bodhisattva's career.

== Selected English translations ==
Larger and smaller Prajnaparamita Sutras

Scholarly

- Edward Conze (1978), Selected Sayings from the Perfection of Wisdom', Buddhist Society, London, ISBN 978-0-87773-709-4. Portions of various Perfection of Wisdom sutras
- Edward Conze (1985), The Large Sutra on Perfect Wisdom, University of California, ISBN 0-520-05321-4. Mostly the version in 25,000 lines, with some parts from the versions in 100,000 and 18,000 lines
- Edward Conze (1994), The Perfection of Wisdom in Eight Thousand Lines and its Verse Summary, Four Seasons Foundation, ISBN 81-7030-405-9. The earliest text in a combination of strict translation and summary
- Lex Hixon (1993), Mother of the Buddhas: Meditation on the Prajnaparamita Sutra, Quest, ISBN 0-8356-0689-9. Selected verses from the Prajnaparamita in 8,000 lines
- R.C. Jamieson (2000), The Perfection of Wisdom, Extracts from the Aṣṭasahāsrikāprajñāpāramitā, Penguin Viking, ISBN 978-0-670-88934-1. Foreword by H.H. the Dalai Lama; illustrated with Cambridge University Library Manuscript Add.1464 & Manuscript Add.1643
- Naichen Chen (2017), The Great Prajna Paramita Sutra, Volume 1, Wheatmark, ISBN 978-1-62787-456-4. Unabridged English translation of Xuanzang's Chinese rendition (fascicles 1-20)
- Naichen Chen (2018), The Great Prajna Paramita Sutra, Volume 2, Wheatmark, ISBN 978-1-62787-582-0. Unabridged English translation of Xuanzang's Chinese rendition (fascicles 21-40)
- Naichen Chen (2019), The Great Prajna Paramita Sutra, Volume 3, Wheatmark, ISBN 978-1-62787-747-3. Unabridged English translation of Xuanzang's Chinese rendition (fascicles 41-60)
- Huifeng Shi (Matthew Osborn) (2018), Annotated English Translation of Kumārajīva's Xiaǒpǐn Prajnāpāramitā Sūtra, Asian Literature and Translation. Critically annotated translation of the first two chapters of Kumarajiva's 5th century translation of the Perfection of Wisdom in Eight Thousand Lines.
- Stefano Zacchetti (2005), In Praise of the Light: a critical synoptic edition with an annotated translation of chapters 1-3 of Dharmarakṣa's Guang zan jing 光讚經, being the earliest Chinese translation of the Larger Prajñāpāramitā, The International Research Institute for Advanced Buddhology, Soka University, Bibliotheca philologica et philosophica buddhica, v. 8.

Buddhist translators/commentators

- Dr. Gyurme Dorje, for the Padmakara Translation Group (2018, updated 2020), The Transcendent Perfection of Wisdom in Ten Thousand Lines, (Daśasāhasrikāprajñāpāramitā), 84000: Translating the Words of the Buddha. The complete Prajnaparamita in 10,000 lines, translated from the Tibetan. With hyper-linked glossary and Tibetan text.
- Gareth Sparham (2022), The Perfection of Wisdom in Eighteen Thousand Lines, |84000: Translating the Words of the Buddha. Full translation from the Tibetan version: Tohoku Catalogue No. 10.

Heart Sutra and Diamond Sutra

Scholarly

- Edward Conze (1988), Buddhist Wisdom Books, Unwin, ISBN 0-04-440259-7. The Heart Sutra and the Diamond Sutra with commentaries
- Edward Conze (2003, Perfect Wisdom; The Short Prajnaparamita Texts, Buddhist Publishing Group, Totnes. (Luzac reprint), ISBN 0-946672-28-8. Most of the short sutras: Perfection of Wisdom in 500 Lines, 700 lines, The Heart Sutra and The Diamond Sutra, one word, plus some Tantric sutras, all without commentaries.
- Richard H. Jones (2012), The Heart of Buddhist Wisdom: Plain English Translations of the Heart Sutra, the Diamond-Cutter Sutra, and other Perfection of Wisdom Texts, Jackson Square Books, ISBN 978-1-4783-8957-6. Clear translations and summaries of the most important texts with essays
- Lopez, Donald S. (1998), Elaborations on Emptiness, Princeton, ISBN 0-691-00188-X. The Heart Sutra with eight complete Indian and Tibetan commentaries
- Lopez, Donald S. (1987), The Heart Sutra Explained, SUNY, ISBN 0-88706-590-2. The Heart Sutra with a summary of Indian commentaries
- Red Pine (2001), The Diamond Sutra: The Perfection of Wisdom; Text and Commentaries Translated from Sanskrit and Chinese, Counterpoint, ISBN 1-58243-256-2. The Diamond Sutra with Chán/Zen commentary
- Red Pine (2004), The Heart Sutra: the Womb of Buddhas, Counterpoint, ISBN 978-1-59376-009-0. Heart Sutra with commentary
- Paul Harrison (2006), Vajracchedikā Prajñāpāramitā: A New English Translation of the Sanskrit Text Based on Two Manuscripts from Greater Gandhāra, Hermes Publishing, Oslo. Translation of the Diamond Sūtra from the Sanskrit based on the two oldest manuscripts (the Gilgit and the Schøyen collection manuscripts)
- Gregory Schopen (2004), The Perfection of Wisdom, in D. S. Lopez Jr., ed., Buddhist Scriptures (London, 2004), pp. 450–463. Translation of the Diamond Sutra
- Kazuaki Tanahashi (2015), The Heart Sutra: A Comprehensive Guide to the Classic of Mahayana Buddhism, Shambhala Publications, ISBN 978-1-61180-096-8. English translation of the Heart Sutra with history and commentary

Buddhist translators/commentators

- Rabten, Geshe (1983), Echoes of Voidness, Wisdom, ISBN 0-86171-010-X. Includes the Heart Sutra with Tibetan commentary
- Geshe Kelsang Gyatso (2001), Heart of Wisdom, Tharpa, ISBN 0-948006-77-3. The Heart Sutra with a Tibetan commentary
- Geshe Tashi Tsering (2009), Emptiness: The Foundation of Buddhist Thought, Wisdom Publications, ISBN 978-0-86171-511-4. A guide to the topic of emptiness from a Tibetan Buddhist perspective, with English translation of the Heart Sutra
- 14th Dalai Lama (2005), Essence of the Heart Sutra, Wisdom Publications, ISBN 978-0-86171-284-7. Heart Sutra with commentary by the 14th Dalai Lama
- Thich Nhat Hanh (1988), The Heart of Understanding, Parallax Press, ISBN 0-938077-11-2. The Heart Sutra with a Vietnamese Thiền commentary
- Thich Nhat Hanh (1992), The Diamond that Cuts Through Illusion, Parallax Press, ISBN 0-938077-51-1. The Diamond Sutra with a Vietnamese Thiền commentary
- Doosun Yoo (2013), Thunderous Silence: A Formula For Ending Suffering: A Practical Guide to the Heart Sutra, Wisdom Publications, ISBN 978-1-61429-053-7. English translation of the Heart Sutra with Korean Seon commentary

== Sources ==
- Karashima, Seishi (2010). A Glossary of Lokakṣema's translation of the Aṣṭasāhasrikā Prajñāpr̄amitā (PDF). Bibliotheca philologica et philosophica Buddhica. Vol. XI. The International Research Institute for Advanced Buddhology, Soka Univ. ISBN 978-4-904234-03-7. Archived from the original (PDF) on 2014-01-08.
- Lopez, Donald S. Jr. (1988). The Heart Sutra Explained: Indian and Tibetan Commentaries. SUNY Press. ISBN 978-0-88706-589-7.
- Müller, F. Max, trans (1894). Buddhist Mahâyâna texts Vol.2, Oxford, Clarendon Press (the Vagrakkedikâ, the larger Pragñâ-pâramitâ-hridaya-sûtra, the smaller Pragñâ-pâramitâ-hridaya-sûtra).
- Orsborn, Matthew Bryan (2012). Chiasmus in the early Prajñāpāramitā: literary parallelism connecting criticism & hermeneutics in an early Mahāyāna sūtra (Thesis). doi:10.5353/th_b4775259.
- Qing, Fa (2001). The development of Prajna in Buddhism from early Buddhism to the Prajnaparamita system: With special reference to the Sarvastivada tradition (PhD Dissertation). Advisor: Kawamura, Leslie S. University of Calgary. hdl:1880/40730. ISBN 0-612-64836-2.
- Vaidya, P.L, ed. (1960). Aṣṭasāhasrikā Prajñāpāramitā with Haribhadra's Commentary Called āloka. Buddhist Sanskrit Texts. Vol. 4. Darbhanga: The Mithila Institute.
