= Large Prajñāpāramitā Sūtras =

Sutra in Mahāyāna Buddhism

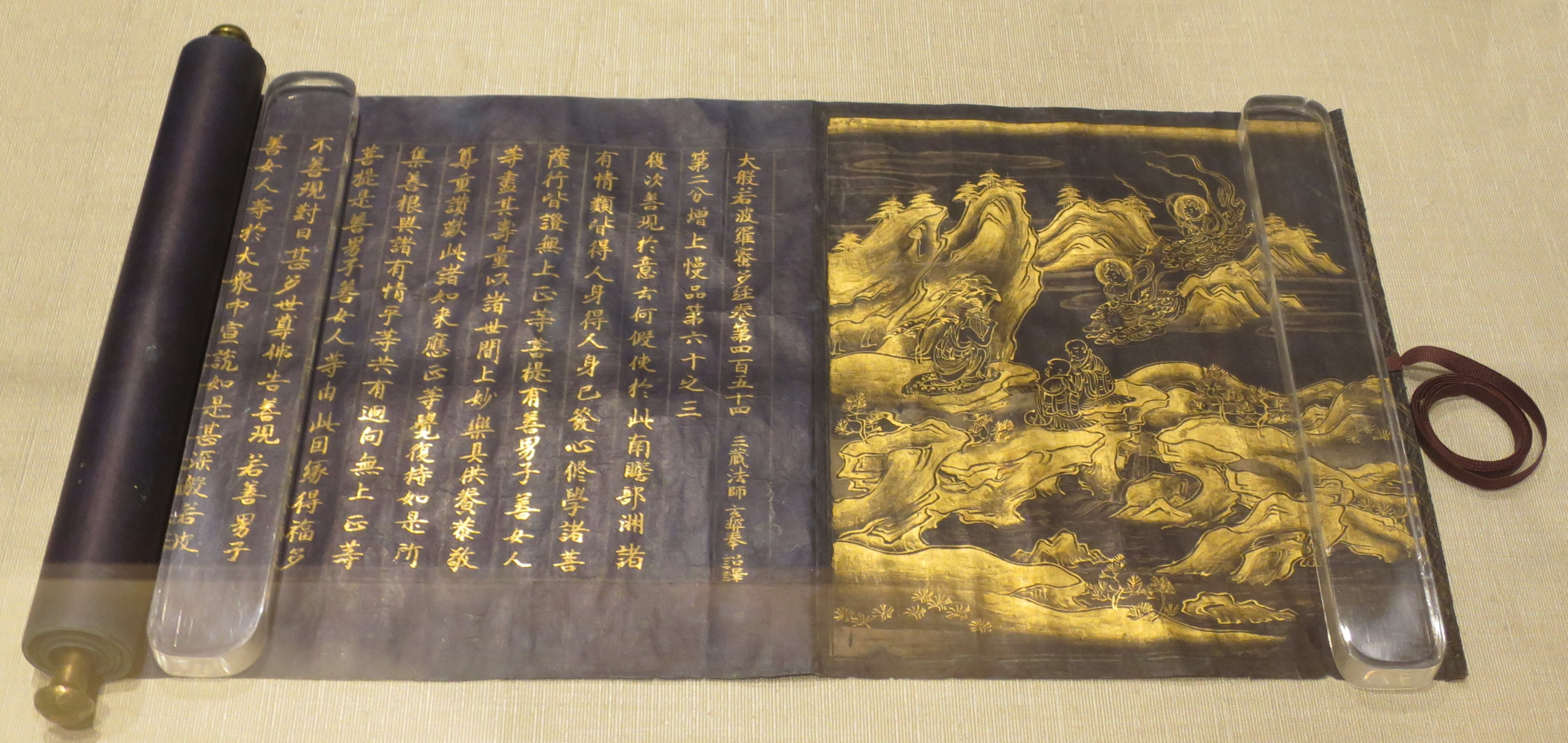
Illustrated frontispiece to the Great Perfection of Wisdom Sutra, Japan, Heian period, late 12th century, handscroll, gold on blue paper, Honolulu Museum of Art

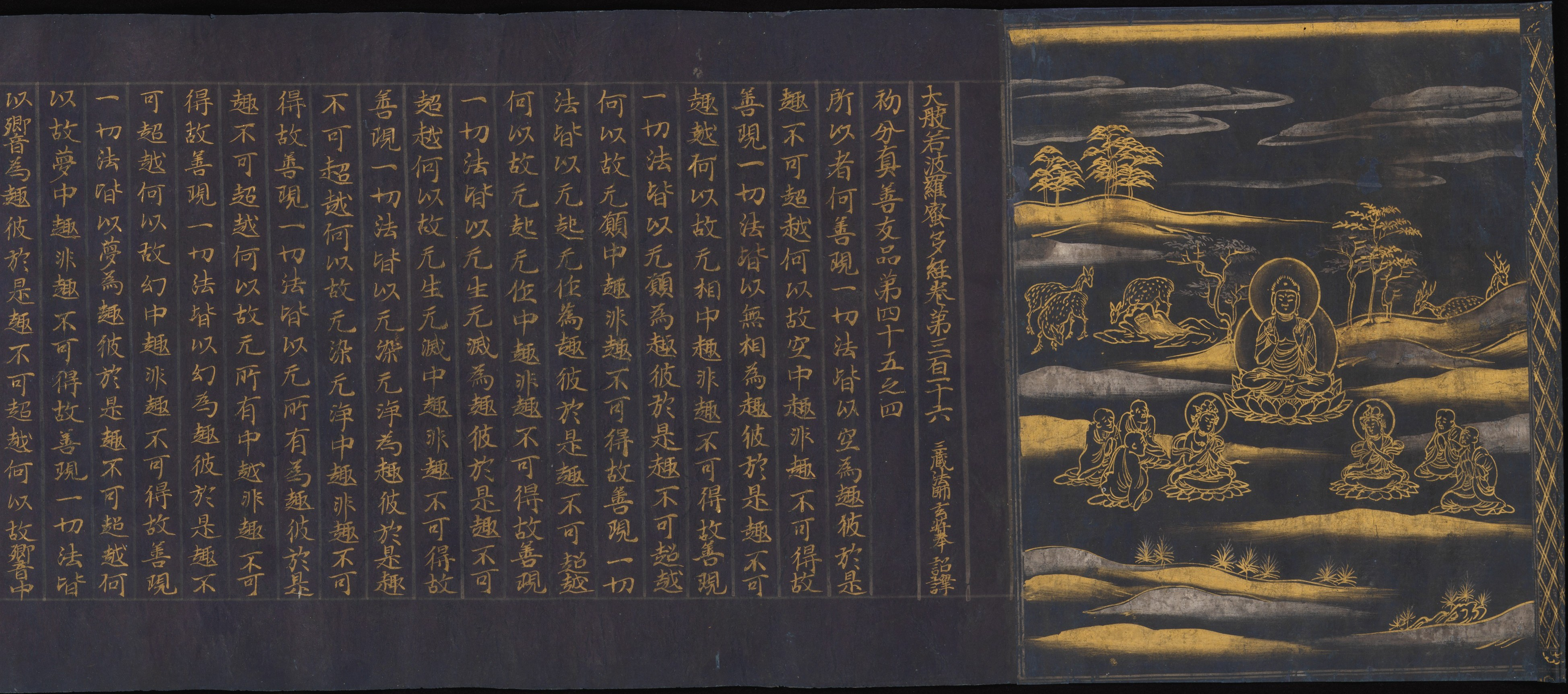
Great Wisdom Sutra from Chūsonji Collection (Chūsonjikyō), Heian period, ca. 1175, Japan, handscroll; gold and silver on indigo-dyed paper, Metropolitan Museum of Art.

The Large Prajñāpāramitā Sūtras (Skt. Mahāprajñāpāramitā, Chinese: 摩訶般若波羅蜜多經; pinyin: Móhē Bōrě Bōluómìduō Jīng; lit. 'Large Perfection of Wisdom Sutra') is a group or family of Mahayana sutras of the Prajñāpāramitā (PP) genre. Modern scholars consider these to be later expansions based on the earlier Aṣṭasāhasrikā Prajñāpāramitā Sūtra, which is seen as a prototype of the Larger sutras.

The various versions and translations of the "Large" Prajñāpāramitā Sūtras contain much shared content, as well as various differences, including being significantly different in terms of length (which is measured in ślokas, often translated as "lines").

== Overview ==
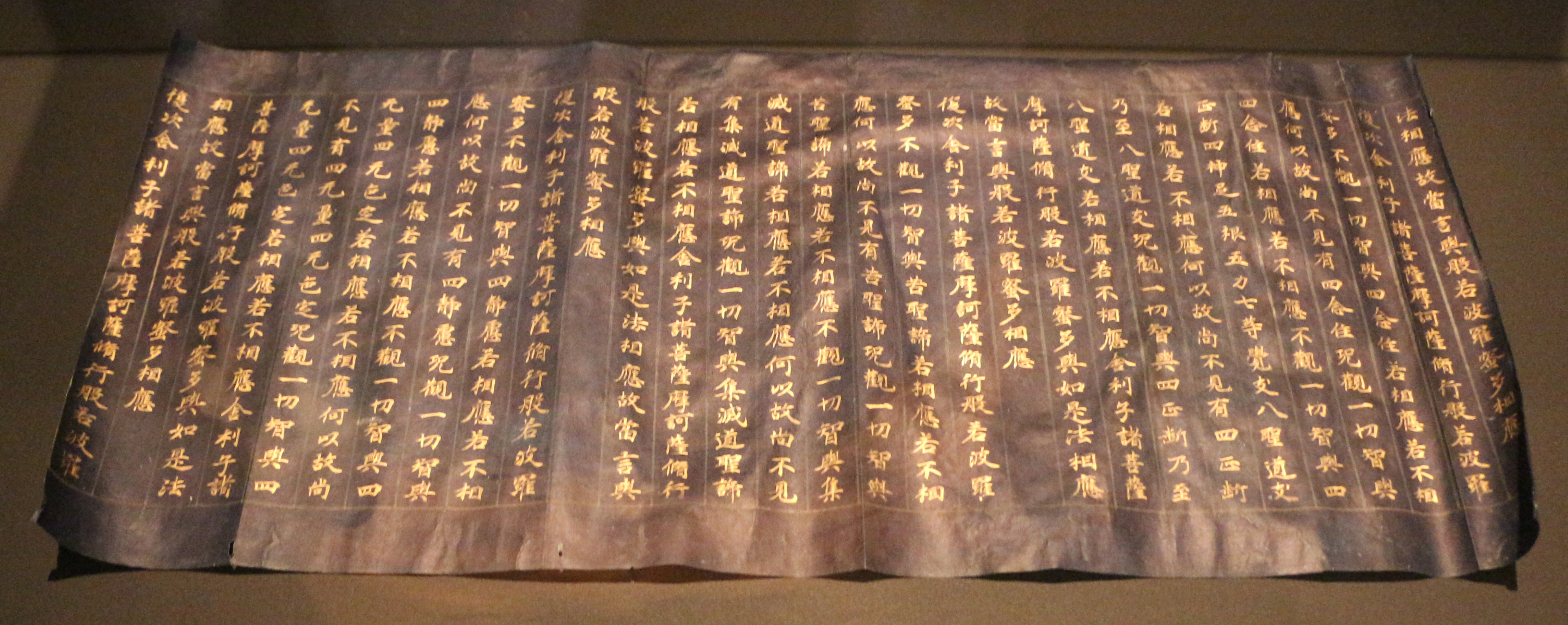
A page from a 12th-century copy of the Large sutra translated into Chinese by Xuánzàng.

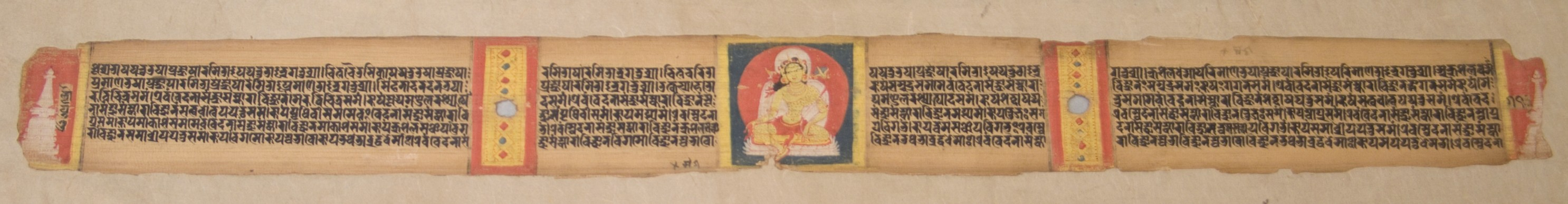
A folio from an Indian 11th century manuscript of the Pañcaviṃśatisāhasrikā

In the Tibetan Buddhist tradition, Prajñāpāramitā sutras are divided into long, medium, and short texts. Edward Conze, one of the first Western scholars to extensively study this literature, saw the three largest Prajñāpāramitā sutras as being different versions of one sutra, which he just called the "Large Prajñāpāramitā". Similarly, Lewis Lancaster writes that these three sutras "contain basically the same text, their length being determined by the amount of repetition."

However, other scholars like Stefano Zachetti disagree that they are one text. According to Zachetti, this is a "textual family," which he terms the "Larger Prajñāpāramitā" and is:

a group of texts that share a number of common features in structure, content, wording, etc. They exhibit a family resemblance, so to speak, fluid and not always easy to define, but significant enough to set them apart from other texts (especially the Aṣṭasāhasrikā PP) as a distinct group. Yet the members of this Larger PP group are differentiated by complex patterns of variation at a variety of levels significant enough to prevent us from classifying them just as one single text.

According to Zacchetti, there are a "considerable number of [Sanskrit] manuscripts" belonging to the "textual family" he calls the "Larger PP texts". Zachetti writes that these manuscripts "greatly differ in age, origin, and size - from sometime around the 6th century to the 19th century AD, and from tiny fragments to complete or nearly complete manuscripts."

According to Shogo Watanabe "as the number of Prajñāpāramitā texts multiplied in India, it became necessary to give them separate designations for the sake of identification. This was accomplished at a later date by naming them according to the number of lines that they contained." However, Watanabe notes that this naming convention was not often used in China and Chinese translations are instead often named according to the first chapter of the sutra. The number of "lines" listed in these titles are also not exact and they often vary in different manuscripts and editions (sometimes by hundreds of verses). The three main Large Prajñāpāramitā sutra versions are the Prajñāpāramitā in 18,000, 25,000 and 100,000 lines. According to Lenagala Siriniwasa Thero, there is also a Nepalese manuscript of a "Mūlabruhatprajñāpāramitā Sutra" that contains over 125,000 lines.

According to Joseph Walser, the three Large Prajñāpāramitā sutras show some doctrinal connection with the Dharmaguptaka school. Walser notes that the 25,000 and the 100,000 line sutras reproduce a list of six kinds of emptinesses found in the Dharmaguptaka Śāriputrābhidharma-śāstra.

Zacchetti notes that this division into three main versions (of 18, 25, and 100 thousand ślokas or akṣaras) does not appear in Buddhist sources until the time of Bodhiruci (6th century). Before this time, the term "Larger Prajñāpāramitā" was used rather loosely to refer to PP sutras larger than 17,000 lines. It is likely that this way of classifying the Longer PP sutras only became widespread later (after the 6th century), when it became the main schema for classifying three different long versions in the translations of Xuánzàng (7th century) as well as in the Tibetan canon.

Chinese sources also use the term "Large Prajñāpāramitā Sūtra" to refer to an entire collection of 16 Prajñāpāramitā Sūtras which was translated by Xuánzàng.

=== The texts ===
==== Aṣṭadaśasāhasrikā Prajñāpāramitā Sūtra ====
The Aṣṭadaśasāhasrikā Prajñāpāramitā Sūtra (18,000 line Perfection of Wisdom Sutra, Tibetan: ’phags pa shes rab kyi pha rol tu phyin pa khri brgyad stong pa zhes bya ba theg pa chen po’i mdo, Chinese: 會第, pinyin: Sānhuì dì sānhuì xù) is preserved in Sanskrit, and Tibetan, Chinese and Mongolian translations. The earliest Sanskrit manuscript of any the Larger Sutra texts is the Gilgit Manuscript of the Aṣṭadaśasāhasrikā, dating to the 5th or 6th century CE. Zacchetti estimates that the Gilgit manuscript contains between 18,000 and 20,000 slokas.

==== Pañcaviṃśatisāhasrikā Prajñāpāramitā Sūtra ====
The Pañcaviṃśatisāhasrikā Prajñāpāramitā Sūtra (25,000 line Perfection of Wisdom Sutra, T: shes rab kyi pha rol tu phyin pa stoq phrag nyi shu lnga pa, dum bu dang po, C: 摩訶般若波羅蜜經, pinyin: móhē bōyě bōluómì jīng) is found in several Sanskrit manuscripts from Nepal and Kashmir. There are two Tibetan translations (in the Tōhoku catalog, they are Tōh. 9 and Tōh. 3790).

This sutra also survives in four Chinese translations by four different translators: Moksala (c. 291 CE), Dharmaraksha (c. 286 CE), Kumārajīva (C. 403 CE), and Xuanzang (c. 660 - 663 CE).

Some Sanskrit manuscripts divide the sutra according to the eight sections of the Abhisamayālaṃkāra, Watanabe calls these "revised" editions (as opposed to an "unrevised" versions). The revised editions also includes numerous other additions and changes. According to Shogo Watanabe's comparative study of the various Large PP sutra sources, the Pañcaviṃśatisāhasrikā and the Aṣṭadaśasāhasrikā "are variant texts deriving from the same source." He posits an urtext from which both sutras developed.

Watanabe also notes that the Chinese translations by Xuanzang contain the most expansions and additions and this shows how the text grew over time.

==== Śatasāhasrikā Prajñāpāramitā Sūtra ====
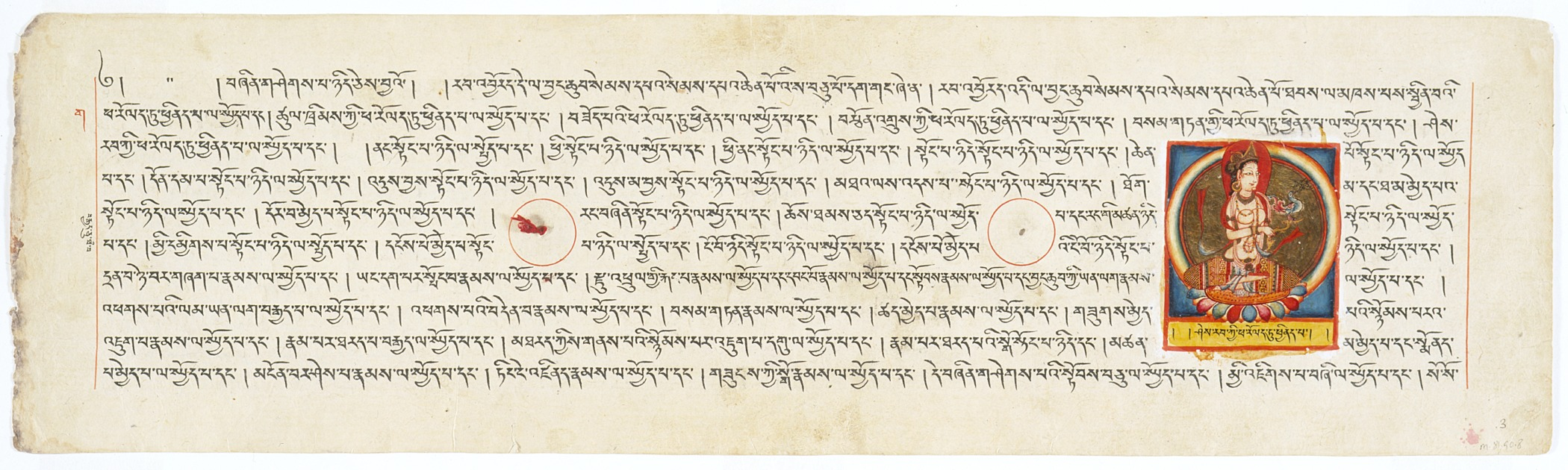
Folio from a Perfection of Wisdom in 100,000 Verses manuscript

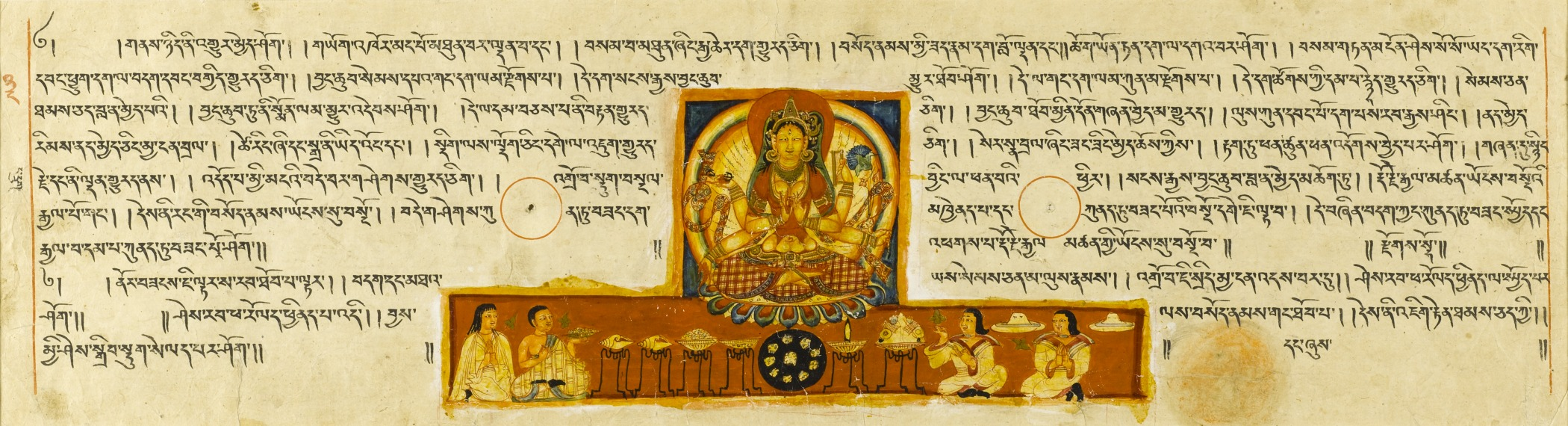
Folio from a Perfection of Wisdom in 100,000 Verses manuscript depicting the bodhisattva Prajñāpāramitā

The Śatasāhasrikā Prajñāpāramitā Sūtra, (100,000 line Perfection of Wisdom Sutra, T: shes rab kyi pha rol tu phyin pa strong phrag brgya pa, C: 初會, pinyin: chū hùi) exists in several Nepalese Sanskrit manuscripts. There is also a Tibetan translation by Yeshé Dé (730–805) and a Chinese translation by Xuanzang in 400 scrolls entitled “The Initial Assembly” (初 會, chū huì).

==== Recensions ====
Zachetti writes that when one analyses the different texts in the Larger PP family, "we find that, intricate as their patterns of correspondence may be...they generally do not fall into groups along the lines of the version-classification." This means that, for example, the Pañcaviṃśati in the Tibetan Kanjur is not actually closer to other texts which are also called Pañcaviṃśati (like Xuanzang's Pañcaviṃśati or the Nepalese recension), but it is actually more similar to the Sanskrit Śatasāhasrikā. Thus, Zachetti argues that there are different lines of transmission of a "Larger PP Ur-text" and that "each of these lines of transmission (or groups of texts), which I call recensions, may include (or might have included) different versions."

Zachetti's hypothetical schema of some of these different lines of transmission (which focuses on the Pañcaviṃśatisāhasrikā) outlines the following "main groupings of Larger PP texts":

- Group A. The Tibetan Pañcaviṃśatisāhasrikā in the Kanjur and the Sanskrit Śatasāhasrikā.
- Group B. Xuanzang's Pañcaviṃśatisāhasrikā and his Śatasāhasrikā.
- Group C. The Nepalese version of the Pañcaviṃśatisāhasrikā.
- Group D. The three earlier Chinese translations of the Pañcaviṃśatisāhasrikā.

Zachetti adds that "at the level of versions, we see that a certain basic text, reflecting a certain recension, may easily be expanded or condensed by manipulating the lists found in this scripture." Thus, the various versions (18,000, 25,000 and 100,000) "are to be seen as particular textual generative principles, rather than as rigidly established "texts" in traditional terms."

Thus, the size of the text is not particularly indicative of the content or of the age of the text itself, since any recension can be enlarged by expanding the various lists found in the sutras. This also means that different versions (based on size) can be created within different recensions.

== Commentaries ==
The Large Perfection of Wisdom texts have been influential works in Mahayana Buddhism. This is indicated the number of commentaries written on these sutras.

In East Asian Buddhism, the Dà zhìdù lùn (大智度論, *Mahāprajñāpāramitopadeśa, T no. 1509), which is a large and encyclopedic commentary to the Pañcaviṃśatisāhasrikā translated into Chinese by Kumārajīva (344–413 CE), remains an important source for numerous Prajñaparamita topics. This is the earliest known commentary to any of the Large PP sutras.

Another Chinese commentary to the 25,000 line sutra was written by Jízáng (549–623), an important figure of the Chinese Madhyamaka school.

In Tibetan Buddhism, the Prajñāpāramitā tradition focuses around the Abhisamayālaṅkāra (Ornament of clear realization, date unknown) and its numerous commentaries. According to John J. Makransky, the Ornament was probably written based on the 25,000 line Prajñāpāramitā Sūtra. The commentary on the Ornament by Ārya Vimuktisena (c. 6th century), is also a commentary on the 25,000 line Perfection of Wisdom Sutra.

Furthermore, a Kashmiri scholar named Daṃṣṭrasena (Diṣṭasena, c. late eighth or early ninth century) wrote two commentaries that survive in Tibetan translation:

- A Commentary on Prajñāpāramitā in 100,000 Verses (Sanskrit: Shatasāhashrikā Prajñāpāramitābrhattīkā, Tibetan: Shes rab kyi pha rol tu phyin pa vbum pa rgya cher vgrel pa) which was translated by Surendrabodhi and Yeshe De.
- The Long Explanation of the Noble Perfection of Wisdom in One Hundred Thousand, Twenty-Five Thousand, and Eighteen Thousand Lines (*Āryaśatasāhasrikāpañcaviṃśatisāhasrikāṣṭādaśasāhasrikāprajñāpāramitābṛhaṭṭīkā, Tibetan: P'hags pa shes rab kyi pha rol tu phyin pa vbum pa daq nyi khri lqa stoq pa daq khri brgyad stoq pavi rgya cher bshad pa), also translated into Tibetan by Surendrabodhi and Yeshes De. Some sources claim that this is by Vasubandhu, but there are textual issues with this attribution.

There are also two more Indian commentaries on the 25,000 line sutra which survive in Tibetan, one by Bhadanta Vimuktisena (a student of Ārya Vimuktasena) and one by Dharmakīrtishrī (Tōh. 3794).

One Indian commentary by Smṛtijñānakīrti (Tōh. 3789) (c. 12th century) is a commentary on all three Large sutras and the Abhisamayālaṅkāra. It is titled: The meaning of the three works, the 100,000, the 25,000 and the 8,000 verses, as presented consistently in the 'Jewel of Cognition'" (Tibetan: Bum dang nyi-khri lnga stong-pa dang khri-brgyad stong-pa gsum don mthun-par-mngon-rtogs brgyad-du bstan-pa bzhugs-so).

The Tibetan Nyingma author Lochen Dharmaśrī (1654–1717) composed a commentary on the 100,000 line sutra entitled A Complete Commentary on Prajñāpāramitā Sūtra in 100,000 Verses (Stoq-phrag-brgya-pavi rnam-par bshad-pa zhes-bya-ba).

Another Tibetan commentary was written by the Gelug figure Longdol Lama Ngawang Lobzang (1719–1794), it is titled: A Brief Explanation of the 108 Topics Treated in Shatasāhasrikā Prajñāpāramitā ('bum-gyi' grel-rkang brgya-rtsa-brgyad ngos-'dzin).

== English Translations ==
The first English translation from the Large sutras was by Edward Conze. Conze's 1973 The Large Sutra of Perfect Wisdom is a composite translation which mostly contains material from the 25,000 line sutra and the 18,000 line sutra (as well as passages from the 8,000 and 100,000 line versions) arranged based on the divisions found in the Abhisamayālaṅkāra. As such, this version is a scholarly construct by Conze.

A recent translation of the full 18,000 line version from the Tibetan canon has been published by Gareth Sparham.

An ongoing translation of Xuanzang's Śatasāhasrikā (100,000 line Perfection of Wisdom Sutra) is currently being undertaken by Naichen Chen, who has published 12 volumes so far as of October 2025.
