= Zhu Zixing =

Chinese buddhist monk and translator

Zhu Zixing (Chinese: 朱士行, 203–282) alternatively Zhu Shixing, is described in Chinese Buddhism as the first Chinese person to be ordained and become a Buddhist monk via contact with others on the Silk Road. His hometown is recorded as Yingchuan, located in Lishui, and he was ordained in Luoyang at the White Horse Temple. Zhu first went to Khotan in Central Asia from Yongzhou in 260 to investigate Buddhism, long before other Chinese monks and travelers reached India to study Buddhism. In Khotan, he acquired a copy of the Sanskrit Pañcaviṃśatisāhasrikā prajñāpāramitā, copied it, and had his disciples bring it back to China. Initially he was opposed by Hinayanist monks who outnumbered Mahayanist monks and were allied with the ruling king. He was eventually successful and the manuscript was sent to China in 282.

Zhu left no records of his travels. His journey was recorded in Buddhist literature, including Hyecho's Memoirs of Eminent Monks, which used material from Zhu's disciple.
