= Abhisamayalankaraloka =

Commentary by Haribhadra from c. 750 CE

Abhisamayālankārāloka
- Also known as: Illumination of the Abhisamayālankāra
- Type: Buddhist
- Date: c. 750
- Language(s): Sanskrit, Tibetan
- Author: Haribhadra

Abhisamayalankaraloka is a commentary, by Haribhadra, on the Aṣṭasāhasrikā Prajñāpāramitā Sūtra. This text is one of the most studied in Tibetan monasteries. At present, there are still commentaries on this "commentary" being written and studied. Around the 10th or 11th century, it was translated into Tibetan.

The Abhisamayalankaraloka was first edited by Giuseppe Tucci, in Gaekwad's Oriental Series, No. 62, 1932. Later, Unrai Wogihara edited it with the text of the Aṣṭasāhasrikā Prajñāpāramitā Sūtra(1932, 1935).
