= Gareth Sparham =

Gareth Sparham is a scholar and translator in the field of Tibetan Buddhism.

== Biography ==
Born in Britain, Gareth Sparham and grew up in Canada. He lived as a Buddhist monk among the Tibetan exile community of Dharamsala, India, for twenty years, and studied at the Institute of Buddhist Dialectics, Dharamshala, from 1974 to 1982. He earned a BA (Hons) in English from McGill University. In 1989, Sparham earned his Ph.D. in Asian Studies from the University of British Columbia. He retired from his position as a lecturer in the Department of Asian Languages and Cultures of the University of Michigan in 2009, where he taught Tibetan. He also taught Tibetan at the University of California, Berkeley.

== Bibliography (translations) ==
- The Tibetan Dhammapada. Wisdom Publications, 1986. A translation of the Udānavarga from the Tibetan.
- Ocean of Eloquence: Tsong kha pa's Commentary on the Yogācāra Doctrine of Mind. SUNY Press, 1993.
- The Fulfillment of All Hopes: Guru Devotion in Tibetan Buddhism. Wisdom Publications, 1999. Translation of a commentary by Tsongkhapa on Aśvaghoṣa's Gurupañcāśika.
- Vast as the Heavens, Deep as the Sea: Verses in Praise of Bodhicitta. Wisdom Publications, 1999. A translation of Khunu Rinpoche Tenzin Gyaltsen's Jewel Lamp.
- Tantric Ethics: An Explanation of the Precepts for Buddhist Vajrayāna Practice. Wisdom Publications, 2005. Translation of a work by Tsongkhapa.
- Abhisamayālaṃkāra with Vṛtti and Āloka (in four volumes). Jain Publishing, 2006 (vol. 1) and 2008 (vol. 2). Translation of a Prajñāpāramitā commentary attributed to Maitreya, with two key subcommentaries by Ārya Vimuktisena and Haribhadra.
- Golden Garland of Eloquence, vols. 1., 2., 3., 4. Jain Publishing. 2008. Translation of an Abhisamayālaṃkāra commentary by Tsongkhapa.
