= Frederick J. Streng =

American religious scholar and author

Frederick John Streng (September 30, 1933 – June 21, 1993) was a noted scholar in Buddhist-Christian studies, author, editor, leader of religious organizations, and Professor of the History of Religions, Southern Methodist University in Texas from 1974 to 1993. He was one of the founding members of the Society for Buddhist-Christian studies, which has bestowed the Frederick Streng Book Award for Excellence in Buddhist-Christian Studies in his honor since 1997.

== Early life ==
Frederick John Streng was born in Seguin, Texas to Adolph C. Streng and Elizabeth M. Hein. His father was a Lutheran minister but Streng always felt restricted by just one religious identity, which led him to study world religious and support Unitarian Universalism later in life.

== Religious scholarship ==
Streng earned a bachelor's degree at Texas Lutheran College, a master's in English at Southern Methodist and a bachelor of divinity and a doctorate in the history of religion at the University of Chicago.

His graduate study at the University of Chicago took place under Mircea Eliade, Joseph Kitagawa, and Bernard Meland, from 1956 to 1963. He wrote his doctoral thesis about Buddhist thinker Nagarjuna, which was later published as Emptiness - A Study of Religious Meaning (Abingdon Press, 1967) and became required reading for leading philosophers and theologians in America.

He studied at Benares Hindu University in India as a Fulbright scholar from 1961-1962, received a National Endowment of the Humanities grant in 1979, and also won Carnegie and Ford fellowships.

Streng was the president of the international Society for Buddhist and Christian Studies and died while serving as its third president. He was also the former president of the American Society for the Study of Religion from 1987-1990. and of the Society for Asian Comparative Philosophy in 1971.

He wrote and edited several books, including Understanding Religious Life (Wadsworth, 1984) and Ways of Being Religious: Readings for a New Approach to Religion (co-authored with Charles L. Lloyd Jr and Jay T. Allen). He also wrote articles for journals, including "The Ontology of Silence and Comparative Mysticism" for Philosophy Today and the Encyclopedia Britannica and the Encyclopedia of Religion, as well as translating and interpreting Madhyamaka texts.

In 1969, he launched The Religious Life of Man Series with Dickenson Publishing Company, which included separate volumes by different authors writing about various religious beliefs around the world.

He began teaching religion at Southern Methodist University in 1966 and received the Outstanding Professor at Southern Methodist University award in 1974. He also received the Distinguished Alumni award from Texas Lutheran College in 1988.

He was a board member of the Greater Dallas Community of Churches and past president of the North Texas Association of Unitarian Universalist Societies.

One of his last public appearances before his death was at the Krost Symposium on Salvation at Texas Lutheran College in 1993, where he spoke of "shared religious intent" between Catholic, Jewish, Hindu, Muslim, and Zen Buddhist traditions, which is a transformative power that transcends biological, social or psychological life, and a freedom of choice which is not a result of physical, biological or social forces, but makes the ultimate transformation of religious salvation possible.

== Death ==
Streng died June 21, 1993, at his home in Dallas at the age of 59, due to cancer.
