= Richard Robinson (Buddhism scholar) =

American scholar of Buddhism (1926–1970)

Richard Hugh Robinson (21 June 1926 – 6 August 1970) was a scholar of Buddhism and the founder of the first Buddhist studies program in the United States that awarded a dedicated doctorate degree.

In the 1950s, he informally studied Sanskrit with Edward Conze.

He died in 1970 after an accident in his home.

Nearly two years after his death, the journal Philosophy East and West published a memorial tribute to him, in an issue that also included three of Robinson's previously unpublished papers.

Charles Prebish, in his 1975 edited introductory volume to Buddhism, wrote that in assembling the team of contributors to the volume

As I began to search for scholars... to make the work effective, I discovered that I was compiling... a tentative list of Richard H. Robinson's former students, although I had not realized just how pervasive both the methodology and substance of Professor Robinson's scholarship was. I had for some time wanted to compile a rather unusual memorial volume, composed of contributions only from Professor Robinson's former students, and now a rather fitting vehicle seemed to emerge. What better way to reveal the manner in which this brilliant scholar's genius had become manifest than to utilize the writings of his former students to actualize that to which Richard Robinson dedicated his life? .... the greatest thanks must go to Professor Richard H. Robinson... Hardly a sincere student of Buddhism emerges who has not been influenced by Richard Robinson in a very profound way.... Robinson, in his own fashion, rewrote the rulebook. Richard found new questions to ask, and with the asking has changed the face of Buddhology. If he could see the new face, there are no doubts it would be grinning.

Nearly fifty years after his death, in 2019, Robinson was profiled in Tricycle: The Buddhist Review, and described as "the most important scholar of Buddhism you've never heard of".
