= Gungru Gyaltsen Zangpo =

Gungru Gyaltsen Zangpo (Tibetan: gung ru rgyal mtshan bzang po; Chinese: Guru Jianzan Sangbu 谷如·坚赞桑布; 1383–1450) was a Tibetan monk. He was a disciple of Tsongkhapa, Gyaltsab, and Khedrub. whose activities had led to the formation of the Gelug school of Tibetan Buddhism.

The Gelugpa master Gungru Gyaltsen Zangpo was the third abbot of Sera, one of the "great three" Gelug university monasteries of Tibet. He divided the monastery in four Dratshang (grwa tshang), named: 1. Gya (rgya) 2. Dromteng ( 'brom steng) 3. Tö (stod), and 4. Me (smad). Soon afterwards, these four were merged into two faculties, namely Sera Tö and Sera Me. His collected works were recently published in the Tibetan book series mes po'i shul bzhag (Chinese: Xianzhe yishu 先哲遗书) in 3 volumes. Gungru Gyaltsen Zangpo had many disciples, several of them very famous persons.

Texts of him are part of a corpus of newly discovered manuscripts in Tibet, which according to James Blumenthal had been missing from circulation since the early eighteenth century.

== Writings ==
His works in the Gsung-'bum (Collected Works) are:

- byams pa'i dgongs rgyan - a commentary on Prajnaparamita philosophy.
- dbu ma rtsa ba shes rab kyi don bsdus - Short explanation of the meaning of Nagarjuna's Mulamadhyamakakarika.
- dbu ma 'jug pa'i 'grel pa - Commentary on the Madhyamakavatara of Chandrakirti.
- legs bshad bla ma'i man ngag bdud rtsi'i chu rgyun - General treatise on Madhyamika philosophy.
- dbu ma bzhi brgya pa'i 'grel pa - Commentary on Aryadeva's Four Hundred Verses
- dbu ma'i stong thun - Survey of Madhyamika thought in the context of the various philosophical positions.
- mngon rtogs rgyan gyi de kho na nyid gsal bar byed pa mkhas pa'i yid 'phrog - A commentary on the Abhisamayalankara.

== See also ==
- Paltsek Research Institute

== Bibliography ==
- Gung ru rgyal mtshan bzang po’i gsung ’bum. 3 vols. Krung go’i bod rig pa dpe skrun khang, 2007. ISBN 978-7-80057-849-6 (in partial view)
