= Mabja Jangchub Tsöndrü =

Tibetan scholar

Mabja Jangchub Tsöndrü (Tib. རྨ་བྱ་བྱང་ཆུབ་བརྩོན་འགྲུས་, Wyl. rma bya byang chub brtson 'grus, d. 1185) was an influential 12th century Tibetan Buddhist Madhyamaka scholar. He is known for his "Ornament of Reason", an important commentary on Nagarjuna's Mūlamadhyamakakārikā.

== Overview ==
Mabja was a disciple of Kadampa scholars of Sangphu monastery such as Patsab Nyima Drak and Chapa Chökyi Seng-ge (1109-1169) as well as of the Indian Madhyamaka Jayānanda. Unlike Chapa, Mabja followed Patsab in embracing the philosophy of Candrakirti, but he also embraced the close study of Buddhist epistemology of pramāṇa (epistemic warrants, reliable means of cognition), which he saw as achievable and necessary.

According to Adam C. Krug:

"Mabja attempts to salvage Buddhist pramāṇa from the kind of categorical rejection leveled by Jayānanda and Patsab by maintaining a radical fallibilism with respect to the status of appearances. He rejects all notions that pramāṇas are related to their objects “by the force of fact” (Skt. vastubalapravṛtti, Tib. dngos po’i stobs zhugs), yet allows for a correct understanding of pramāṇas as relative truth (Skt. saṃvṛtisatya, Tib. kun rdzob bden pa) in light of their basis in a pre-analytic experience of dependent origination."

Mabja also maintained a radical agnosticism regarding the nature and status of Buddhahood.

=== Works ===
Mabja wrote the following works:

- The Ornament of Reason, a commentary on Nagarjuna's Mūlamadhyamakakārikā.
- The Appearance of Reality, Ornament to the Six Collections of Middle Way Reasoning. A series of root verses and a commentary on Madhyamaka reasoning. The work follows Jayānanda’s Logic Hammer (Skt. Tarkamudgara) in some respects.
- A Commentary on Candrakirti's Clear Words (Skt. Prasannapadā)

=== Influence ===
Mabja's Madhyamaka scholarship was very influential on later Tibetan Madhyamikas like Longchenpa, Tsongkhapa, Gorampa, and Mikyö Dorje. All these figures read Mabja and responded to him in different ways, often drawing on his insights. In his Light Rays of the Authentic View, Gorampa even reproduces passages directly taken from Mabja’s Ornament of Reason (without mentioning his source). Similarly, according to Thomas Doctor, Tsongkhapa’s famous critique of svātantrika madhyamaka is mostly a restatement of Mabja's critique (something which Śākya Chokden had pointed out in his critique of Tsongkhapa). Doctor also notes that "Mikyö Dorje declares Mabja to be the central Tibetan authority behind his presentation of the two truths."

== Sources ==
- Doctor, Thomas (2014). Reason and Experience in Tibetan Buddhism: Mabja Jangchub Tsöndrü and the Traditions of the Middle Way. Routledge.
- Mabja Jangchub Tsöndrü (2011), Ornament of Reason: The Great Commentary to Nagarjuna's Root of the Middle Way, Translated by the Dharmachakra Translation Committee. Ithaca: Snow Lion.
- Kevin A. Vose (2009) Resurrecting Candrakirti: Disputes in the Tibetan Creation of Prasangika, Boston: Wisdom Publications.
