= Chökyi Gyaltsen =

Chökyi Gyaltsen may refer to:

- Choekyi Gyaltsen, 10th Panchen Lama
- Jetsun Chökyi Gyaltsen
