= Lodro Rinchen Sengge =

Lodro Rinchen Sengge (blo gros rin chen seng ge; 14th/15th cent.) was a Tibetan monk in the Gelug and Nyingma tradition. He was the original founder of Sera Je. He maintained the Hayagriva practice and instituted the “Most Secret Hayagriva” tradition, a lineage still preserved today in Sera Je and its branches, including the Sera Monastery in India. Jetsun Chökyi Gyaltsen (a.k.a. "Jetsunpa"; 1469-1544) refuted and later displaced his teachings there. His writings (gsung rtsom) were recently published in the Tibetan book series mes po'i shul bzhag (Chinese: Xianzhe yishu 先哲遗书) in 1 volume.

== See also ==
- Paltsek Research Institute
