= Karika =

Genre of Sanskrit literature

Kārikā (कारिका) is a genre of Sanskrit literature. "Kārikā" also refers to any metrical verse or line which explains, in an aphoristic manner, some key idea (usually philosophical).

Karikas are often structured in concise, metrical form, making them easy to remember and recite, and they serve to clarify complex teachings or doctrines within Indian philosophy.

The term is commonly used in Indian philosophical and spiritual texts, where a Karika is a verse or set of verses providing insight, analysis, or commentary on a main text. For example:

Gaudapada's Karika: This is one of the most famous collections of Karikas, a commentary on the Mandukya Upanishad, explaining the principles of Advaita Vedanta.

Mulamadhyamaka Karika: Written by Nagarjuna, this text provides verses on the Middle Way philosophy in Mahayana Buddhism.

There are Hindu and Buddhist examples of the genre.

Some important Kārikās include:

- Sāṁkhyakārikā, the earliest work of the Hindu Sāṁkhya school of philosophy
- Nāgārjuna's Mūlamadhyamakakārikā (Root Verses on Madhyamaka)
- Gaudapada's Māṇḍukya Kārikā (on the Māṇḍukya Upanishad)
- Bhavaviveka's Madhyamakahṛdayakārikā (Verses on the Heart of Madhyamaka)
- Kallata's Spandakārikā, a Kashmiri Shaiva work
- Īśvarapratyabhijñākārikā of Utpaladeva
- Yāpparunkalak Kārikai, a Tamil treatise on prosody
