= Rongzom Chökyi Zangpo =

Rongzom Chökyi Zangpo (Tibetan: རོང་ཟོམ་ཆོས་ཀྱི་བཟང་པོ, Wylie: rong zom chos kyi bzang po), widely known as Rongzom Mahapandita, Rongzom Dharmabhadra, or simply as Rongzompa, was one of the most important scholars of the Nyingma school of Tibetan Buddhism. Together with Longchenpa and Ju Mipham, he is often considered to be one of the three "omniscient" writers of the school. His elder contemporary Atiśa (980–1054) considered Rongzompa to be an incarnation of the Indian ācārya Kṛṣṇapāda, the Great. The Tibetan historian Gö Lotsawa (1392–1481) said of Rongzom that no scholar in Tibet was his equal.

A.W. Barber writes that Rongzom was the first to receive the entire Dzogchen teachings of both Vimalamitra and Vairotsana after the time of those two masters. According to the Blue Annals, Rongzom Chokyi Zangpo ... received the Semde (sems sde) teachings of the Dorje Dudjom transmission line.

David Germano writes "In the eleventh century, Rongzom Chokyi Zangpo was without doubt the greatest Nyingma author, with extensive exoteric and esoteric commentaries."

== Positions ==
Rongzom held that the views of sutra such as Madhyamaka were inferior to that of tantra, as Koppl notes:

By now we have seen that Rongzom regards the views of the Sutrayana as inferior to those of Mantra, and he underscores his commitment to the purity of all phenomena by criticizing the Madhyamaka objectification of the authentic relative truth.

== Writings ==
According to a catalog of the commentaries he codified, the collected works of Rongzompa amounted to over 100 volumes, the majority of which are no longer extant. In the 19th century, Ju Mipham, who was particularly influenced by Rongzompa's writings, attempted to gather the surviving works together.

Important surviving works of Rongzom Chokyi Zangpo include:

- Entering the Way of the Great Vehicle (Mahayana) (Tibetan: ཐེག་པ་ཆེན་པོའི་ཚུལ་ལ་འཇུག་པ, Wylie: theg pa chen po’i tshul la ’jug pa) – presents a defense and explanation of the Dzogchen tradition in the context of the Mahayana. This text has been translated into English: Entering the Way of the Great Vehicle: Dzogchen as the Culmination of the Mahāyanā, translated by Dominic Sur ( Snow Lion, 2017, Pages: 272, ISBN 9781611803686)
- A commentary on Padmasambhava's Key Instructions: A Rosary of Views (Tibetan: མན་ངག་ལྟ་ཕྲེང་གི་འགྲེལ་པ, Wylie: man ngag lta phreng gi 'grel pa) – presents the view of the Nyingma school's nine yanas.
- A commentary on the Manjusrinama-Samgiti (Tibetan: མཚན་ཡང་དག་པར་བརྗོད་པའི་འགྲེལ་པ་རྣམ་གསུམ་བཤད་པ, Wylie: mtshan yang dag par brjod pa'i 'grel pa rnam gsum bshad pa). This has been translated into English in The Wisdom of Manjushri (Sherdor, 2012).
- A commentary on the Guhyagarbha Tantra (Tibetan: རྒྱུད་རྒྱལ་གསང་བ་སྙིང་པོ་དཀོན་ཅོག་འགྲེལ, Wylie: rgyud rgyal gsang ba snying po dkon cog 'grel)
- Establishing the Divinity of Appearances (Tibetan: སྣང་བ་ལྷར་བསྒྲུབ, Wylie: snang ba lhar bsgrub) – a short text that presents the logical grounds for the pure view of Buddhist tantra. This text has been translated into English (by Heidi Köppl, in Establishing Appearances as Divine, 2008).
- The Great Stage of Buddhahood (Sangs rgyas kyi sa chen mo, Skt. Mahābuddhabhūmī), translated in Rong-zom-pa's discourses on buddhology: a study of various conceptions of buddhahood in Indian sources with special reference to the controversy surrounding the existence of gnosis (jñā-na : ye shes) as presented by the eleventh-century Tibetan scholar Rong-zom Chos-kyi-bzang-po, by Orni Almogi as Volume 24 of Studia philologica Buddhica: Monograph series, The International Institute for Buddhist Studies of the International College for Postgraduate Buddhist Studies, 2009. Herein, Rongzom argues that on the level of the Buddha, gnosis does not exist, meaning that everything has been transcended and sublimated.

== Sources ==
- Almogi, Orna (2002). "Sources on the Life and Works of the Eleventh Century Tibetan Scholar Rong Zom Chos Kyi Bzang Po: A Brief Survey". In Blezer, Henk (ed.). Tibet, Past and Present. Tibetan Studies I: Proceedings of the Ninth Seminar of the International Association for Tibetan Studies. Leiden: Brill. pp. 67–80. ISBN 90-04-12775-5.
- Barber, A. W. (1990). "The Unifying of Rdzogs Pa Chen Po and Ch'an". Chung-Hwa Buddhist Journal. 3: 301–317.
- Tashi Dorjee, Khenpo Urgyen Rinzin, Khenpo, Palzang Dorgye, Lobpon-ma Karma Yangchen, 4th batch of NNRC (2018). sNang Ba lhar sGrub pa'i tshul la brtag pa (Thesis). Bylakuppe, Mysore.: Ngagyur rNying ma'i zhib 'jug lte gnas khang. pp. 1–438. ISBN 978-93-83068-82-1.
- Dudjom, Jikdrel Yeshe Dorje; Dorje, Gyurme (1991). The Nyingma School of Tibetan Buddhism, Its Fundamentals and History (1 ed.). Boston: Wisdom. pp. 703–9. ISBN 0-86171-087-8.
- Dudjom, Jikdrel Yeshe Dorje; Dorje, Gyurme (2005). The Nyingma School of Tibetan Buddhism, Its Fundamentals and History (2 ed.). Boston: Wisdom Publications. ISBN 0-86171-199-8.
- Ray, Gary L. (2002). "The Northern Ch'an School and Sudden Versus Gradual Enlightenment Debates In China And Tibet". thezensite.
- Roerich, George N.; Gö Lotsawa Zhönnupal (1949). The Blue Annals (1998 reprint ed.). Delhi: Motilal Banarsidass. ISBN 81-208-0471-6.
- Germano, David (2002). "A Brief History of Nyingma Literature". THDL. Archived from the original on 2007-12-16.
- གཞན་ཕན་ཆོས་ཀྱི་ནང་བ།. "དགེ་བའི་བཤེས་གཉེན་ཆེན་པོ་ཆོས་ཀྱི་་བཟང་པོའི་རྣམ་པར་ཐར་པ། / རོང་ཟོམ་ཆོས་བཟང་གི་གསུང་འབུམ།". v1. སི་ཁྲོན་མི་རིགས་དཔེ་སྐྲུན་ཁང་།: 23–30.
- Köppl, Heidi I. (2008). Establishing Appearances as Divine: Rongzom Chözang on Reasoning, Madhyamaka, and Purity. Ithaca, New York: Snow Lion Publications. ISBN 978-1-55939-288-4.
