= Sakya Chokden =

Serdok Penchen Shakya Chokden (gser mdog pan chen shakya mchog ldan, 1428–1507) was one of the most important religious thinkers of the Sakya school of Tibetan Buddhism. He was a student of Rongtön Shecha Kunrig (1367-1449), Dönyö Pelwa, Künga Zangpo and many other Tibetan scholars. He also received empowerments and studied under several Kagyu lineages. Shakya Chokden's seat was the Thubten Serdogchen monastery in south Shigatse.

== Philosophy ==
Shakya Chokden broke from Sakya orthodoxy and wrote a highly critical commentary to Sakya Pandita's "A thorough differentiation of the three vows" posing over 100 questions to Sakya scholars on this text. This event caused some controversy and Chokden answered his own questions in his subsequent "Golden lancet". Shakya Chokden's Definite ascertainment of the middle way criticized Tsongkhapa's Madhyamaka views as being too logo-centric and still caught up in conceptualization about the ultimate reality which is beyond language.

In his later years, Shakya Chokden moved away from a strictly Prasangika Madhyamika view (as held by Chandrakirti) and adopted a kind of Shentong (emptiness of other) view influenced by the works of Asanga, Vasubandhu and Maitreya-nātha.

His later work attempted to reconcile the philosophies of Yogacara and Madhyamaka as valid and complementary perspectives on Ultimate Truth. Shakya Chokden saw the Yogacara "Alikakaravada" view as also being a form of Madhyamaka because it holds that mental objects are ultimately unreal or false (alika) and worked to prove its compatibility with the Madhyamaka Nihsvabhavavada view (emptiness of inherent existence).

Madhyamaka is seen by Shakya Chokden as removing the fault of taking the unreal as being real, and Yogacara removes the fault of the denial of Reality. Likewise, the Shentong and Rangtong views are seen as complementary by Shakya Chokden; Rangtong negation is effective in cutting through all clinging to wrong views and conceptual rectification while Shentong is more amenable for describing and enhancing meditative experience and realization. Therefore, for Shakya Chokden, the same realization of ultimate reality can be accessed and described in two different but compatible ways. Shakya Chokden held that this view was more in concordance with Vajrayana teachings and Tantras. Perhaps his most controversial view was that Ultimate reality or Primordial Mind is an impermanent phenomenon and that this is supported by Yogacara, Sutra and Tantra.

Since his views conflicted with those of Sakya Pandita, they were not well received by the Sakya school. In the 17th century, followers of the politically dominant Gelug school proscribed his writings and shut down the printery where his works were kept.

== Works ==
- Good Questions about the ‘Thorough Differentiation of the Three Types of Vows.’
- Golden Lancet: Resolved Abundant Discourse on the ‘Thorough Differentiation of the Three Types of Vows’ Treatise.
- Garlands of Waves of Assertions
- Great Path Compressing the Two Chariot Ways into One: Explanation of [Maitreya's] ‘Ornament of Clear Realizations’ Together with [Haribhadra's] ‘Clear Meaning’ Commentary.
- Ocean of Scriptural Statements and Reasoning
- Definite ascertainment of the middle way
- Profound Thunder amidst the Clouds of the Ocean of Definitive Meaning: Differentiation of the Two Systems of the Great Madhyamaka Deriving from the Two Great Chariot Ways
- Rain of Ambrosia: Extensive [Auto-]Commentary on the ‘Profound Thunder amidst the Clouds of the Ocean of Definitive Meaning.’
- Great Path of Ambrosia of Emptiness: Explanation of Profound Pacification Free from Proliferations
- Guiding Instructions on the Madhyamaka View
- Abbreviated Meaning of the ‘[Hevajra in] Two Chapters’

== See also ==
- Gorampa
- Sakya Pandita

== Sources ==
- Komarovski, Yaroslav. Radiant Emptiness, Oxford University Press 2020
- Komarovski, Yaroslav. Echoes of empty luminosity: Reevaluation and unique interpretation of Yogacara and Nihsvabhavavada Madhyamaka by the fifteenth century Tibetan thinker Sakya mchog ldan, Ph.D. dissertation, University of Virginia (2007).
- Komarovski, Yaroslav. Visions of Unity: The Golden Pandita Shakya Chokden's New Interpretation of Yogacara and Madhyamaka, SUNY 2011
- Shakya Chokden, Three Texts on Madhyamaka, trans. Komarovski Yaroslav, Dharamsala: Library of Tibetan Works and Archives, 2002
