= Jamgön Ju Mipham Gyatso =

Tibetan Buddhist master (1846–1912)

Mipham Gyamtso
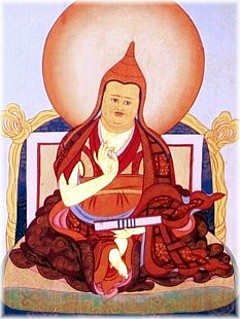
- Born: 1846; Kham, Tibet
- Died: 1912 (aged 65–66)

Philosophical work
- Region: Buddhist philosophy
- School: Nyingma
- Main interests: Madhyamaka, Dzogchen, Pramana
- Notable works: Beacon of Certainty; Commentary on Śāntarakṣita’s Ornament of the Middle Way; Trilogy of Innate Mind; Lion’s Roar: Exposition of Buddha-Nature
- Notable ideas: His two models of the two truths doctrine, fourfold pramana (valid cognition), unity of purity and equality

- Jamgön Ju Mipham Gyatso

Tibetan name
- Tibetan: འཇམ་མགོན་འཇུ་མི་ཕམ་རྣམ་རྒྱལ་རྒྱ་མཚོ་
Transcriptions
- Wylie: 'jam mgon 'ju mi pham rnam rgyal rgya mtsho
- THL: Ju Mipam Namgyel Gyamtso
- Lhasa IPA: [d̠ʑàmɡøn tɕù mìpʰam námcɛː(l) càmtsʰo]

Chinese name
- Traditional Chinese: 米龐仁波切
- Simplified Chinese: 米庞仁波切
Transcriptions
Standard Mandarin
- Hanyu Pinyin: Mǐpáng Rénbōqiē

Jamgön Ju Mipham Gyatso, or Mipham Jamyang Namgyal Gyamtso (1846–1912) (also known as "Mipham the Great") was a very influential philosopher and polymath of the Nyingma school of Tibetan Buddhism. He wrote over 32 volumes on topics such as painting, poetics, sculpture, alchemy, medicine, logic, philosophy and tantra. Mipham's works are still central to the scholastic curriculum in Nyingma monasteries today. Mipham is also considered to be one of the leading figures in the Rimé (non-sectarian) movement in Tibet.

== Derivation of name ==
"Ju" ("holding") was Mipham's family name as his paternal clan is said to have originated as clear light deities who came to the human world holding a rope. "Jamgön" (Skt. Mañjunātha) indicate that he was considered to be an emanation of the bodhisattva Mañjuśrī. His maternal uncle, Minister-Lama Drupchok Pema Tarjay, named him Mipham Gyamtso ("Invincible Ocean" or "Unconquerable Ocean"). In Tibetan literature, the word "mi-pham" is the standard translation of the Sanskrit "ajita", meaning "unconquered", which is a common epithet of the celestial bodhisattva Maitreya.

== Biography ==
=== Early life ===
Mipham the Great was born to an aristocratic family in 1846 in the Derge Principality of Kham or Eastern Tibet. He was recognized as an exceptional child from a young age, memorizing texts as early as age six. By the age of ten he had already composed many texts. At twelve, he entered the monastery as an ordinary monk of the Ogmin Urgyen Mindrolling lineage at a branch monastery of the great Nyingma seat Shechen.

When he was fifteen or sixteen, after studying the very difficult Mindrolling system of chanting for only a few days and praying to Manjushri, he is said to have completely mastered it. In an 18-month retreat he accomplished the form of Manjushri known as 'Lion of Philosophers' (Tibetan: smra ba'i seng ge), using a liturgy composed by the fifteenth Karmapa, Khakhyab Dorje. He made many medicinal pills blessed with Manjushri's mantra, and many miraculous signs were said to have been manifest. After this, it was said that he could accomplish any sutra or tantra without any effort, and no text was unknown to him. He went to many lamas to obtain the necessary lungs (oral transmissions), but he needed no study or teachings for any texts.

=== Teachers ===
Mipham was "a luminary of the nineteenth century Nyingma renaissance and Rime movement ecumenical movement, which started in the Kham region of eastern Tibet". As such he received teachings from masters of all lineages Nyingma and Sarma alike. His root gurus were Dza Patrul Rinpoche, from whom he received instruction on Shantideva's Bodhicharyavatara and Dzogchen and the renowned master Jamyang Khyentse Wangpo, from whom he received transmission of the orally transmitted or Kama and revealed or Terma lineages, and many other teachings. His other teachers included Jamgon Kongtrul Lodro Thaye; Dzogchen Khenpo Padma Vajra; Lab Kyabgon Wangchen Gyerab Dorje; Jubon Jigme Dorje; Bumsar Geshe Ngawang Jungne and Ngor Ponlop Jamyang Loter Wangpo.

== Philosophy ==
A key theme in Mipham's philosophical work is the unity of seemingly disparate ideas such as duality and nonduality, conceptual and nonconceptual (nirvikalpa) wisdom, rational analysis and uncontrived meditation, presence and absence, immanence and transcendence, emptiness and Buddha nature. Mimicking the Sarma schools, Mipham attempted to reconcile the view of tantra, especially Dzogchen, with sutric Madhyamaka. This was in departure with the Nyingma school which generally positioned the view of tantra as superior to the view of Madhyamaka.

For Mipam, the unity of philosophical views is ultimately resolved in the principle of coalescence (Sanskrit: yuganaddha, Tib: zung 'jug), which is the nonduality of conventional and ultimate realities, of samsara and nirvana. Unlike Tsongkhapa who held that emptiness, as an absolute negation, was the definitive reality and view, Mipham sees coalescence of gnosis and emptiness, form and emptiness, etc. as "the ultimate hermeneutical cornerstone of his interpretations".

In his many texts Mipham explores the tension and dialectic that arises between philosophical reasoning of the ordinary mind (rnam shes) which is represented by the Madhyamaka philosophy and luminous nonconceptual wisdom (ye shes), which is the focus of the teachings of Dzogchen. He attempts a synthesis of them to show that they are not incompatible perspectives and that the teachings of Dzogchen are in line with reason.

=== Criticism of Gelugpa Madhyamaka ===
Mipham undertook a rigorous criticism of various features of Gelugpa Madhyamaka, such as their insertion of qualifiers which limit the Madhyamaka negandum to "ultimate" existence, as well as uniquely Gelugpa assertions, such as "the vase is not empty of vase but of hypostatic [or inherent] existence."

==== Gelugpa insertion of qualifiers ====
Gelugpa Madhyamaka is concerned to specify that the type of existence negated by Madhyamaka analysis is ultimate and not conventional existence. As such, Gelugpas insist on the insertion of qualifiers, lest one negate too much. However, according to Mipham, the addition of the qualifier "ultimate" to the negandum (that which is to be negated) had been the main point of disagreement between the Prāsaṅgika Candrakīrti and the Svātantrika Bhāvaviveka, with Candrakīrti arguing that Madhyamaka must negate all types of production, not merely ultimate or inherent production. For any production that Madhyamaka fails to negate would not in fact be empty of its own being. On the other hand, Bhāvaviveka maintained that phenomena were empty of ultimate nature, but not empty of conventional own-being (even at the level of ultimate analysis). Mipham argues that the Prāsaṅgika charge that Svātantrikas hold to a substantialist position in their limitation of the negandum (with the insertion of the qualifier "ultimate") must equally apply to the Gelugpas themselves.

Like Mipham and Indian masters such as Candrakīrti, Gelugpas assert that emptiness is an absolute or non-implicative negation (prasajyapratiṣedha, med dgag), meaning a negation which does not affirm the existence of anything. However, Mipham observes that negating a subject's inherent existence without negating the subject itself would in fact be an implicative negation (paryudāsa, ma yin dgag), contrary to what the Gelugpas claim. Mipham argues that by inserting the qualifier "inherently existent" to the statement, "there is no production," the Gelugpas negate inherently existent production but still affirm a kind of production, namely non-inherently existent production.

Mipham also criticized the Gelugpas for the use of qualifiers in negating the tetralemma (catuṣkoṭi). For Mipham, the negation of the tetralemma must be taken at face value to mean the elimination of the four extremes: [1] existence, [2] nonexistence, [3] both existence and nonexistence, and [4] neither existence nor nonexistence. However, for Gelugpas, the negation of the tetralemma cannot be taken literally. They argue it is a contradiction to negate existence while also negating nonexistence. This is because the latter, being a double negation, affirms existence, contradicting the former. As such, the Gelugpas claim, one must insert qualifiers to the extremes negated. In response, Mipham argues that the negation of the tetralemma is non-implicative, i.e. it simply removes each of the four extremes without affirming anything.

Instead of negating existence, nonexistence, etc; Gelugpas negate inherent existence, conventional nonexistence, and so on. This they do as they are concerned to preserve rules of logic, such as the laws of non-contradiction and excluded middle. However, for Mipham, rules of logic such as double negation as well as the laws of non-contradiction and excluded middle are merely intended to aid beginners in debate. They belong to the realm of conventional truth, but do not apply at the level of ultimate emptiness, which is free of all elaborations and conceptual positions.

==== "A vase is not empty of vase" ====
Mipham was also highly critical of the Gelugpa construction, "a vase is not empty of vase but of hypostatic [or inherent] existence." Mipham points out that it is actually a species of other-emptiness (shentong), contrary to the Gelugpas' claim to uphold the doctrine of self-emptiness (rangtong). This is because the inherent existence being negated is something other than the vase itself. This is like a yak's horn being empty of a rabbit's horn, i.e. it is the emptiness of one thing lacking another (itaretaraśunyatā, gcig la gcig med pa’i stong pa). Mipham calls this the worldly form of emptiness, as opposed to the ultimate, which is the scope of yogis.

According to the Gelugpa Tsongkhapa, if the vase were empty of vase, it would be utterly nonexistent. Thus, for Tsongkhapa, ultimate analysis must establish a basis of negation (such as a vase) which is by nature not the negandum (inherent existence). However, Mipham argues that it is a substantialist tendency to think that negating the vase itself would lead to its total annihilation. It is to fail to see that, although the vase is empty of vase, it is nonetheless undeniable as a dependently originated appearance. What ultimate analysis targets is precisely these conventionally evident phenomena. Moreover, negating something conventionally nonexistent (such as a rabbit's horn or a barren woman's child) is not within the scope of ultimate analysis, as there is no need to negate something at the level of ultimate analysis that does not even exist conventionally.

According to Mipham, the negation of a nonexistent thing cannot be the reality (dharmatā, chos nyid) of conventionally existent things. It is not the emptiness of one's own being. Such an emptiness would be similar to a vase's emptiness of cloth, or the emptiness of a rabbit's horn in a yak's horn, which is not the ultimate reality of the vase or yak's horn respectively. What's more, the construction, "the vase is not empty of vase but of inherent existence," contradicts numerous scriptures in which one finds statements such as "matter is empty of matter," and "eye is empty of eye." And since ordinary people do not experience an inherent existence separate from the conventionally existent vase itself, it is the very vase itself which must be established as empty.

According to Mipham, if it is only empty of some separate inherent existence but not empty of itself, the vase cannot be established to be illusory. This is like how knowing that a rope is not a snake does not lead to the realization of the illusory nature of the rope itself. Mipham argues that this is also like the understanding that a horse is not a cow: such cannot be considered the emptiness of horse, i.e. of the horse's own nature. For Mipham, if emptiness were merely the absence of one thing in another, like the absence of cow in a horse, understanding emptiness would be very simple. Since anyone can see that a horse is not a cow, Mipham asks, why is it said of the understanding of emptiness that it is something exquisite?

For Mipham, if the inherent existence to be negated is something other than the vase itself, it would follow that the absence of inherent existence could not be the nature of the vase, i.e. the absence of inherent existence would also be other than the vase. This is to segregate emptiness from conventional appearance. For Mipham, the point is to see that dependently originated phenomena appear in spite of their being empty. In Mipham's view, to be empty means to be not found under the scrutiny of ultimate analysis. However, if the negandum qua inherent existence is other than the vase, then the vase itself would not be empty (only inherent existence would be empty). In that case, the appearance of the vase would not coalesce with emptiness. Further, since a separate inherent existence does not exist even conventionally, there can be no conventional appearance for the absence of that inherent existence to coalesce with. In that case, one could not speak of the coalescence of the two truths, or the equality of samsāra and nirvāṇa.

Mipham explains that if an entity such as a vase is not empty of its own nature, only of some isolated inherent existence, its lack of inherent existence will not be established. For Mipham, for something to be without inherent existence is for it to be without its own being, for that very thing to not be apprehended under ultimate analysis, i.e. to be proven non-existent. If they are not negated by ultimate analysis, it follows that conventional entities, such as vases, would be inherently existent. That is, according to Mipham, to be not negated by ultimate analysis is to be immune to ultimate analysis, which is by definition what it means to be established as inherently existent.

==== Soteriological implications ====
If phenomena are not negated by ultimate analysis, Mipham points out, they would exist by their own characteristics (rang mtshan gyis yod par 'gyur). In that case, subjective emotions and attachments could not be eliminated. That is, since objects existing by their own characteristics are what delusion conceives, so long as these persist, deluded emotions will not have ceased. In this way, objects of grasping would continue. Mipham argues that overcoming attachment to the aggregates cannot be achieved by seeing that they lack some isolated inherent existence, but by not apprehending the aggregates.

For Mipham, emptiness is the nature of what conventionally appears, not of an utterly nonexistent entity (such as a rabbit's horn). For emptiness and dependent arising are in primordial coalescence, and it is these very dependently originated things which conventionally exist and form the objects of our attachments. However, if these objects are not void of themselves per se, but only of some other entity, they would not be by nature pure (viśuddha, rnam dag), i.e. void of the innate afflictions and reifications which characterize samsāric existence. Moreover, if the union of dependent arising and emptiness does not refer to the fact that phenomena appear while being empty of themselves, but rather to their appearance while being empty of some other thing, then Mipham asks, why does not the whole world appear from the lack of a rabbit's horn? For Mipham, merging the appearance of a yak's horn with a nonexistent rabbit's horn is not the same as understanding that emptiness and dependent arising share one nature.

Mipham's main criticism of the Gelugpa position is soteriological. That is, if inherent existence is treated separately from what empirically appears, such as a vase, then understanding the absence of such an inherent existence would not have any impact on our ordinary experience of the world. If what is negated is not an existing phenomenon, its negation will not be able to overcome our attachment and grasping. It will not do any good to merely negate some impossible entity that is different from the objects of our experience. The absence of such an entity would still leave phenomena unscathed, doing no harm to our attachment to them. For sentient beings do not conceive of inherent existence apart from phenomena, but rather cling to those very phenomena.

==== View of middle way ====
Mipham also criticized the Gelugpa interpretation of the middle way, or freedom from extremes. According to the Gelugpa view, freedom from the extreme of existence means to lack inherent existence, while freedom from the extreme of nonexistence means to exist conventionally. However, for Gelugpas, the two, i.e. absence of inherent existence and affirmation of conventional existence, are not themselves negated. As such, Mipham argues that since they must combine two factors in order to form the middle way (absence of inherent existence and conventional existence), the Gelugpas' view of the emptiness of inherent existence is not by itself free of all extremes. Furthermore, Mipham points out that one requires conceptual thought (zhen rig) in order to synthesize the two components. However, since sublime beings in meditative equipose are free of conceptual elaboration, it absurdly follows that they would not abide in the middle way, while ordinary beings engaging in conceptual reflection on the binary combination would.

According to Mipham's view, the authentic middle way is the emptiness beyond all extremes and conceptual elaborations. It should not be understood like a point between two pillars, but rather as the freedom from any focal point whatsoever that can be apprehended. For Mipham, the binary factors of conventional existence and absence of inherent existence are still not beyond conceptual elaborations. As such, they themselves become subtle extremes. For Mipham, when the reality free from all elaborations is established, all notions of existence and nonexistence whatsoever are dispelled. In this way, Mipham distinguishes the provisional middle way between inherent existence and conventional nonexistence from the final middle way beyond all elaborations.

=== Two models of the two truths ===
Mipham developed a twofold model of the Buddhist two truths doctrine. The first model is the traditional Madhyamaka perspective which presents the two truths of emptiness and appearance, with emptiness representing the level of ultimate truth and appearance representing relative truth. In this model the two truths are really the same reality and are only conceptually distinct.

In his second model of the two truths, Mipham presents an authentic truth and an inauthentic truth. Authentic experience is any perception that is in accord with reality (gnas snang mthun) and perceptions which do not are said to be inauthentic. This differs from the first model because in the first model only emptiness is ultimate while in the second model the ultimate truth is the meditative experience of unitary wisdom. Instead of just being a negation, it includes the subjective content of the cognition of wisdom as well as the objective nature of reality. In this model the ultimate truth is also reality experienced nonconceptually, without duality and reification, which in Dzogchen is termed rigpa, while the relative truth is the conceptual mind (sems).

According to Mipham these two models do not conflict. They are merely different contextually; the first relates to the analysis of experience post meditatively and the second corresponds to the experience of unity in meditative equipose. This synthesis by Mipam is ultimately a bringing together of two different perspectives in Tibetan philosophy, rangtong and shentong, which Mipam associated with the teachings of the second turning (Prajnaparamita sutras) and third turning (Yogacara and Buddha nature sutras) respectively:

The emptiness taught in the middle wheel and the exalted body and wisdom taught in the last wheel should be integrated as a unity of emptiness and appearance. Without dividing or excluding the definitive meaning subject matters of the middle and last wheels, both should be held to be the definitive meaning in the way of just this assertion by the omniscient Longchen Rapjam. - Lion's Roar, exposition of Buddha nature.

For Mipham, both of these teachings are definitive and a middle way between both of them is the best way to avoid the extremes of nihilism and essentialism.

=== Fourfold valid cognition ===
Another original contribution of Mipham is his system of fourfold valid cognition (pramana) which has two conventional and two ultimate valid cognitions:

Conventional valid cognitions

- Confined perception, ordinary valid experience
- Pure vision free of distortion

Ultimate valid cognitions

- Categorized Ultimate, emptiness as a negation known by mind
- Uncategorized Ultimate, nonconceptual wisdom

=== View of buddha-nature ===
According to Mipham, buddha-nature is neither [1] truly established, [2] a mere emptiness, nor [3] an impermanent and conditioned entity. In this way, he distinguished his unique position on buddha-nature from those of the Jonang, Gelug, and Sakya; which correspond respectively to the first, second, and third positions. In delineating his unique position on buddha-nature, Mipham was concerned to avoid the extremes of a permanent substantive entity, on the one hand, and a mere emptiness devoid of intrinsic qualities, on the other. In accordance with the view of the Great Perfection, Mipham understands buddha-nature to be already complete and perfect (against the Gelugpa view), yet without asserting its ultimate existence in the manner of the proponents of other-emptiness (e.g. the Jonang). Mipham's commentator Bötrül also points out that, for Mipham, buddha-nature is neither established from the point of view of ultimate valid cognition, nor is it posited merely from the point of view of the mistaken perception of ordinary beings. Mipham instead held that buddha-nature is established by the conventional valid cognition of pure vision.

For Mipham, the intrinsic qualities of buddha-nature exist naturally and are not produced by causes and conditions. However, these qualities are to be understood as the appearance or conventional aspect of gnosis, which do not exist inherently in an ultimate sense. That is, the intrinsic qualities of buddha-nature are not established at the level of ultimate analysis, which establishes emptiness alone. At the same time, neither are they established by ordinary dualistic perception. Rather, Mipham argues that they are established by the conventional valid cognition of pure perception, which is the conventional mode of perception of sublime beings. Thus, Mipham maintains that buddha-nature is endowed with inseparable qualities without committing to an eternalistic view which takes buddha-nature to exist ultimately. In this way, Mipham aimed to integrate the insights of the second and third turnings of the wheel of Dharma, which taught emptiness and buddha-nature respectively.

According to the text Distinguishing the Views and Philosophies, which is Bötrül's exposition of Mipham's philosophy, Mipham's view of buddha-nature brings together his two models of two truths, as well as ultimate valid cognition and conventional valid cognition of pure vision, thereby unifying the viewpoints of the second and third turnings of the wheel of Dharma. In accordance with the two truths model of appearance and emptiness, the essence of buddha-nature is the emptiness established by ultimate analysis. As it is empty at the level of ultimate analysis, buddha-nature is free of the extreme of permanence. However, in accordance with the two truths model of authentic and inauthentic experience, the buddha heritage is the luminous clarity consisting of knowledge, love, and powers, which is the object established by the conventional valid cognition of pure vision. Since it is found by conventional valid cognition of pure vision, it is free from the extreme of annihilation.

According to Mipham, from the point of view of reality, no distinctions can be made and buddha-nature is free of all constructs such as existence, nonexistence, permanence, and annihilation. However, from the point of view of appearance, Mipham argues that distinctions can be made conventionally between true and false, the permanent and the impermanent, and the existent and the nonexistent. From this point of view, buddha-nature is conventionally known to be permanent, while conditioned entities are understood to be momentary. Similarly, one conventionally apprehends the existent to refer both to causality qua dependent arising and the spontaneously present qualities of suchness, the buddha-nature naturally abiding within all sentient beings.

For Mipham, when the buddha qualities appear, it is not that they are newly produced, rather they are merely made manifest. That is, while they seem to be newly arisen, they are in fact primordial endowments. Mipham inherited a distinction from Longchenpa between two types of effects: [1] produced effects, such as when a sprout is produced by a seed; and [2] freed effects, such as when the sun appears after the clouds have vanished. For Mipham, the buddha qualities are freed effects in that they are simply made manifest when the conditions that obscure them have been removed. They are not produced anew.

== Work and legacy ==
As scholar Robert Mayer remarks, Mipham "completely revolutionised rNying ma pa scholasticism in the late 19th century, raising its status after many centuries as a comparative intellectual backwater, to arguably the most dynamic and expansive of philosophical traditions in all of Tibetan Buddhism, with an influence and impact far beyond the rNying ma pa themselves."

=== Scope ===
In the Introduction to his critical study of the ontological debates between Mipham and his Gelugpa opponents (Mipham's Dialectics and the Debates on Emptiness) Lopon Karma Phuntsho defines Mipham as a polymath and gives this assessment of the scope of Mipham's work:

Mipham is perhaps the greatest polymath Tibet ever produced. His writings comprise works on a wide range of subjects, covering almost every science known to his milieu. In traditional terms he is a Mahāpaṇḍita who has mastered the ten sciences of arts and crafts (bzo), health science (gso ba), language (sgra), logico-epistemology (tshad-ma), soteriology (nang don), poetry (snyan ngag), lexicology (mngon brjod), prosody (sdeb sbyor), dramaturgy (zlos gar), and astrology (dkar rtsis). It is due to the polymathic nature of his learning and his exceptional ingenuity that Mipham today ranks amongst the leading religious and spiritual celebrities of Tibet.

Mipham's works on both the exoteric or Sutrayana teachings and the esoteric or Vajrayāna teachings have become core texts within the Nyingma tradition. These works now hold a central position in the curriculum of all Nyingma monasteries and monastic colleges — occupying a place of esteem similar to the works of Sakya Pandita and Gorampa in the Sakya tradition; those of Tsongkhapa in the Gelug tradition and of Kunkhyen Padma Karpo in the Drukpa Kagyu. Together with Rongzompa and Longchenpa, Mipham is considered to be one of the three "omniscient" writers of the Nyingma tradition.

=== Commentaries on Buddhist Śāstra ===
Although Mipham wrote on a wide range of subjects, David Germano identifies the most influential aspect of Mipham's career in that he "was the single most important author in the efflorescence of Nyingma exoteric literature in the nineteenth and twentieth centuries. Grounding himself theoretically in the writings of Longchenpa and other great Nyingma authors, Mipham produced brilliant exegetical commentaries on the great Indian philosophical systems and texts with a Nyingma orientation."

E. Gene Smith also judged that Mipham's greatest contribution was "in his brilliant and strikingly original commentaries on the Indian treatises." Prior to Mipham, Nyingmapa scholars "had seldom written detailed pedagogical commentaries on the śāstras of exoteric Buddhism." Until his time the colleges or shedra associated with the great Nyingma monasteries of Kham, such as Dzogchen, Shechen, Kathog, Palyul and Tarthang lacked their own exegetical commentaries on these exoteric Mahayana śāstras, and students commonly studied Gelug commentaries on these fundamental texts. Grounding himself in the writings of Śāntarakṣita, Rongzom Chokyi Zangpo, and Longchenpa, Mipham produced a whole array of brilliant exegetical commentaries on the great Indian philosophical systems and texts that clearly articulated a Nyingma orientation or view.

The texts include his commentaries on the Mulamadhyamakakarika or Fundamental Stanzas on Wisdom by Nagarjuna; the Introduction to the Middle Way (Sanskrit: Madhyamakāvatāra) of Chandrakirti; the Quintessence of all Courses of Ultimate Wisdom (Jnanasarasamuccaya) of Aryadeva; commentaries on the major works of the Indian Buddhist logicians Dharmakirti and Dignaga; commentaries on the Five Treatises of Maitreya most notably, the Abhisamayalamkara; commentaries on several works of Vasubandhu including the Abhidharmakosha. Mipham's commentary on the ninth chapter of Shantideva's Bodhicaryavatara, the Shertik Norbu Ketaka (Tibetan: ཤེར་ཊཱིཀ་ནོར་བུ་ཀེ་ཏ་ཀ་, Wylie: sher ṭīk nor bu ke ta ka), "threw Tibetan scholarly circles into several decades of heated controversy," but "it was not the only tempest Mipham's new expositions raised." His commentary on the Madhyamakalamkara of Śāntarakṣita was also considered highly controversial.

=== Commentaries on Tantras ===
Mipham's commentary on the Guhyagarbha Tantra is entitled The Essence of Clear Light or Nucleus of Inner Radiance (Wylie: od gsal snying po)— it is based on Longchenpa's commentary, Dispelling Darkness in the Ten Directions Wylie: gsang snying 'grel pa phyogs bcu mun sel which explains the Guhyagarbha from the Dzogchen point of view.

Mipham showed particular interest in the Kalachakra and the kingdom of Shambhala, and one of his last and most extensive of his esoteric works are his two volumes of commentary, initiation and sadhana related to the Kalachakra Tantra, the esoteric teaching from Shambhala. Before he died in 1912, he said to his students that now he was going to Shambhala.

=== Mipham and Gesar ===
Throughout his life, Mipham showed a particular interest in the legend of the warrior king Gesar of Ling, a 12th-century figure whose epic is well-known and widely celebrated in eastern Tibet, and about whom Mipham wrote extensively.

The Gesar practice, known as "The Swift Accomplishment of Enlightened Activity Through Invocation and Offering" (Wylie: gsol mchod phrin las myur 'grub) arose in the mind of Mipham as a gong-ter and was written down over the course of three years from the age of 31 to 34. This practice invokes Gesar and his retinue and requests him to assist practitioners.

=== Medicine ===
Mipham's medical works continue to be highly regarded to this day. His approach was a holistic one including Buddhist philosophy, logic, astrology and ritual science. His medical corpus represented a late 19th century synthesis of the Tibetan medical tradition, engaging topics like diagnosis, pharmacology, pathology, therapeutic methods, medicinal substance, and exegesis of the classical Tibetan medical tantras. Rather than founding a new medical system or distinct medical school, his contribution lay in the clarification of synthesis, and transmission of existing Tibetan medical knowledge through commentarial and instructional works. These writings, are valued as scholastic and pedagogical contributions that helped preserve and explain established medical knowledge for further generations.

=== Astrology and divination ===
Mipham also wrote extensively about astrology which was, in his words, a "delightful game" that he mastered in his teens but later applied to more serious topics such as medicine; these two topics, with various texts on more or less related topics of divination, occupy perhaps 2,000 pages of his writing. An entire volume of Mipham's is devoted to Ju-thig or divination using knots, a method that might be termed "Bon" in origin, for want of a more accurate term; this may have been the legacy of his family, who were doctors for several generations. Throughout his writings there are many resources for divination, in addition to astrology, including several rituals for looking in mirrors (pra-mo), one using dice (mo), pulling different-length 'arrows' (Wylie: da dar) out of a quiver and so on, compelling a non-human "bird" to whisper future news in one's ear, and so on. In one short text he prescribes various methods of divination (all drawn, Mipham emphasizes, from Tantric scriptures and commentaries) that make use of unusual sources of augury such as: the vicariously overheard chatter of women; sudden appearance of various animals, especially birds; weather phenomena; the shape, size and color of flames in the agnihotra or fire puja; the quality of burning butter lamps, especially the size of the flame, the amount and shape of smoke that arises; and the size and shape of the carbon deposit on the wick.

When some of his scholarly rivals thought it inappropriate for a monk to devote so much time to matters of future events, Mipham wrote a short essay explaining the purpose of divination, citing sources in the Sutras and Tantras where the utility and value of divination are explained.

== Students ==
Mipham's most important students were Dodrub Rinpoche, Terton Sogyal, the Fifth Dzogchen Rinpoche, Gemang Kyab Gon, Khenpo Padmavajra, Katog Situ Rinpoche, Sechen Rabjam, Gyaltsab Tulku, Palyul Gyaltrul, Karma Yangtrul, Palpung Situ Rinpoche, Ling Jetrung, Adzom Drukpa (1842-1924), Togdan Shakya Shri, Ngor Ponlob, and others. The great tulkus of Sechen, Dzogchen, Katog, Palyul, Palpung, Dege Gonchen, Repkong and others of all lineages, Sakya, Gelug, Kagyu, and Nyingma, all became his disciples.

== Emanations of Ju Mipham ==
According to one account shortly before he died, Mipham told his attendant:

Nowadays, if you speak the truth, there is nobody to listen; if you speak lies everyone thinks it is true. I have never said this before: I am not an ordinary person; I am a bodhisattva who has taken rebirth through aspiration. The suffering experienced in this body is just the residue of karma; but from now on I will never again have to experience karmic obscuration. … Now, in this final age, the barbarians beyond the frontier are close to undermining the teaching. [So] there is no point whatsoever in my taking rebirth here…I have no reason to take birth in impure realms ever again.

This may be interpreted as a statement that his mindstream would have no further 'emanations' (Wylie: sprul pa (emanation body); sprul sku (tulku)). Conversely, according to another account in which he mentions the mindstream in passing and prophesies the shortly before his death to his student Khenpo Kunphel:

Now I shall not remain long in this body. After my death, in a couple of years hence, war and darkness shall cover the earth, which will have its effect even on this isolated snow land of Tibet. In thirty years time, a mad (smyo) storm of hatred will grow like a fierce black thundercloud in the land of China, and in a further decade this evil shall spill over into Tibet itself, so that Lamas, scholars, disciples and yogis will come under terrible persecution. Due to the demon-king Pehar taking power in China, darkness and terror ('bog) will come to our sacred land, with the result that violent death shall spread like a plague through every village. Then the three lords of materialism (gsum-gyi-kla-klos) and their cousins will seize power in Tibet, spreading war, famine and oppression. No one will be safe. Now, very soon, my mind-stream will be gathered up in the pure-land of Tusita, from whence many emanations [of myself] shall then come forth in future years. I shall not take rebirth in Tibet. In twenty years, seek me in the northern lands of distant Uttarakuru, and elsewhere, east, west, north and south. Fear not, we shall be re-united again, as father and son. Now go!

In the above account, shortly after the departure of Khenpo Kunphel he stated publicly, "Now, soon I shall depart. I shall not be reborn again in Tibet, therefore do not search for me. I have reason to go to Shambhala in the north."

Subsequently, a number of emanations have been recognized.

According to E. Gene Smith "At least three rebirths were recognized in the decade following his death: 1) Zhe chen Mi pham (a grandnephew of Mi pham rgya mtsho); 2) Tshe dbang bdud 'dul (1915/16-42) the last prince of Sde dge; 3. Khyung po Mi pham, an incarnation recognized by Rdzong gsar Mkhyen brtse 'Jam dbyangs chos kyi blo gros."

The next (third) Mipham in the line of the Dege Prince who died in 1942 was apparently born in Tibet in 1949 and recognised by Tengye Rinpoche of Lab i 1959 At that time he was enthroned and given responsibility for all monasteries previously held by the first and second incarnations. This third incarnation was also confirmed by Patrul Rinpoche who gave him relics of the previous incarnations and by Dilgo Khyentse Rinpoche, who he had recognized in a previous incarnation. This Mipham incarnate is the father of Thaye Dorje, one of two candidates to be recognized as the 17th Karmapa, and of 14th Sonam Tsemo Rinpoche, an important Gelug/Sakya tulku.

In 1995, Ösel Rangdröl Mukpo (b. 1962), the eldest son of renowned dharma master Chogyam Trungpa Rinpoche and Ani Könchok Palden, was recognized as a reincarnation of Mipham Rinpoche by HH Drubwang Padma Norbu Rinpoche, at the time the head of the Nyingma lineage. He is now known as Sakyong Mipham Rinpoche, and is the spiritual head of Shambhala International.

== Alternate names ==
In contemporary scholarship, the nomenclature "Mi-pam" and "Mipam" has become an accepted alternative. Writers such as Hopkins and Duckworth have adopted this convention. He is also known by the following alternate names:

- Jamgon Ju Mipham Gyatso (ʼJam-mgon ʼJu Mi-pham rgya-mtsho)
- Jamgön Mipham (ʼJam-mgon Mi-pham)
- Ju Mipham (ʼJu Mi-pham)
- Mipham Gyatso (mi pham rgya mtsho)
- Ju Mipham Jampal Gyepa'i Dorje (ʼJu Mi-pham 'jam dpal dgyes pa'i rdo rje)
- Ju Mipham Namgyal Gyatso (ʼju mi pham rnam rgyal rgya mtsho)
- Mipham Namgyal Gyatso (mi pham rnam rgyal rgya mtsho)
- Jamgon Mipham Gyatso (ʼjam mgon mi pham rgya mtsho)
- Mipham the Great (mi-pham chen-po)
- Lama Mipham (bla-ma mi-pham)
- Mipham Rinpoche (mi-pham rin-po-che)

== English translations ==
- Buddhist Philosophy in Theory and Practice: Summary of the Philosophical Systems as Detailed in the Yid-bzhin-mdzod (excerpts). Trans. Herbert V. Guenther. Shambala Publications, Inc/Penguin, 1971/72
- Calm and Clear by Lama Mipham. Trans. Tarthang Tulku. Dharma 1973
- Golden Zephyr: Instructions from a Spiritual Friend. Nagarjuna and Lama Mipham. Trans. Leslie Kawamura. Dharma 1975
- Lama Mipham's commentary to Nagarjuna's Stanza's for a Novice Monk. Trans. Glenn H. Mullin and Lopsang Rabgay. LTWA 1978
- The Fish King's Power of Truth: A Jataka Tale Retold by Lama Mipham. Arranged by Tarthang Tulku. Dharma 1990
- The Quintessential Instructions of Mind: The Buddha No Farther Than One's Palm. In Dream Yoga and the Practice of Natural Light, Namkhai Norbu and Michael Katz. Snow Lion 1992, 2002; Shambhala 2025
- Ways of Enlightenment: Buddhist Studies at Nyingma Institute, based on Mipham's mkhas 'jug. Compiled and edited by Dharma Publishing staff. Dharma 1993
- Gateway to Knowledge. Trans. Erik Pema Kunsang. Rangjung Yeshe 1997-2012
  - Vol 1 (1997) ISBN 978-9627341291
  - Vol 2 (2002) ISBN 978-9627341420
  - Vol 3 (2002) ISBN 978-9627341468
  - Vol 4 (2012) ISBN 978-9627341680
- Mipham's Beacon of Certainty: Illuminating the View of Dzogchen, the Great Perfection. Trans. John Whitney Pettit. Wisdom 1999
- Mo: The Tibetan Divination System. Translated by Jay Goldberg. Snow Lion 2000.
- Middle-way Meditation Instructions of Mipham Rinpoche. Trans. Thrangu Rinpoche. Namo Buddha 2001
- Introduction to the Middle Way: Chandrakirti's Madhyamakavatara with Commentary by Jamgön Mipham. Trans. Padmakara Translation Group. Shambhala 2002
- Speech of Delight: Mipham's Commentary of Shantarakshita's Ornament of the Middle Way. Trans. Thomas H. Doctor. Snow Lion 2004
- Maitreya's Distinguishing Phenomena and Pure Being with Commentary by Mipham. Trans. Jim Scott. Snow Lion 2004
- The Adornment Of The Middle Way. Trans. Padmakara Translation Group. Shantarakshita & Jamgon Mipham. Shambhala 2005
- Gem that Clears the Waters: An Investigation of Treasure Revealers. In "Tibetan Treasure Literature", trans. Andreas Doctor. Snow Lion 2005. pp. 56–71
- Fundamental Mind: The Nyingma View of the Great Completeness by Mi-pam-gya-tso, comm. by Khetsun Sangpo Rinbochay. Trans. Jeffrey Hopkins. Snow Lion 2006
- Middle Beyond Extremes: Maitreya's Madhyantavibhaga with Commentaries by Khenpo Shenga and Ju Mipham. Trans. Dharmachakra Translation Committee. Snow Lion 2007
- Mipam on Buddha-Nature: The Ground of the Nyingma Tradition. Selected translations by Douglas S. Duckworth. SUNY 2008
- White Lotus: An Explanation of the Seven-line Prayer to Guru Padmasambhava by Jamgön Mipham. Trans. Padmakara Translation Group. Shambhala 2008
- Garland of Jewels: The Eight Great Bodhisattvas. Trans. Yeshe Gyamtso. KTD Publications 2008
- The Way of the Realized Old Dogs, Advice that Points out the Essence of Mind, called "A Lamp that Dispels the Darkness". Trans. Tony Duff. PKTC 2009
- The Method of Preserving the Face of Rigpa, the Essence of Wisdom: An Aspect of Training in Thorough Cut. Trans. Tony Duff. PKTC 2009
- Luminous Essence: A Guide to the Guhyagarbha Tantra. Trans. Dharmachakra Translation Committee. Snow Lion 2009
- The Blessing Treasure: A Sadhana of the Buddha Shakyamuni by Mipham Rinpoche. A Commentary by Khenchen Palden Sherab Rinpoche & Khenpo Tsewang Dongyal Rinpoche. Dharma Samudra 2009.
- The Wheel of Analytic Meditation. Trans. Adam Pearcey. In "The Collected Works of Dilgo Khyentse", Vol. 2. Shambhala 2010.
- Essence of Clear Light: An Overview of the Secret Commentary "Thorough Dispelling of Darkness throughout the Ten Directions". Trans. Light of Berotsana. Snow Lion 2010.
- Unending Auspiciousness: The Sutra of the Recollection of the Noble Three Jewels, with Commentaries by Ju Mipham, Taranatha and the Author. Trans. Tony Duff. PKTC 2010.
- Jamgon Mipham: His Life and Teachings. Selected translations by Douglas S. Duckworth. Shambhala, 2011
- The Verses of the Eight Noble Auspicious Ones. CreateSpace, 2013.
- Tengye Monlam, an Aspiration for the Spread of the Nyingma Teachings: The Oral Transmission that Gladdens the Dharma Kings in "Liberating Duality with Wisdom Display: The Eight Emanations of Guru Padmasambhava". Khenchen Palden Sherab Rinpoche and Khenpo Tsewang Dongyal Rinpoche. Translated by Ann Helm. Dharma Samudra 2013.
- Ornament of the Great Vehicle Sutras: Maitreya's Mahayanasutralamkara with Commentaries by Khenpo Shenga and Ju Mipham. Trans. Dharmachakra Translation Committee. Snow Lion 2014.
- Shower of Blessings. Yeshe Gyamtso. Ktd Publications 2015.
- The Wheel of Investigation and Meditation that Thoroughly Purifies Mental Activity and the Lamp That Dispels Darkness in "Pith Instructions: Selected Teachings and Poems". Dilgo Khyentse. Shambhala 2015. (Only available as eBook).
- A Garland of Views: A Guide to View, Meditation, and Result in the Nine Vehicles. Padmakara Translation Group. Shambhala 2016.
- The Ketaka Jewel: A Commentary on the Prajna Chapter Making the Words and Meaning Easy to Understand . Translated by Gawang Rinpoche and Gary Weiner. CreateSpace 2016
- The Just King: The Tibetan Buddhist Classic on Leading an Ethical Life. Translated by Jose Cabezon. Shambhala 2017.
- Pointing to the Nature of Awareness (rtogs ldan rgan po rnams kyi lugs sems ngo mdzub tshugs kyi gdams pa mun sel sgron me), in "A Gathering of Brilliant Moons". Translated by Douglas Duckworth. Wisdom Publications, 2017. (Also translated in Duff 2009, above).
- The Wisdom Chapter: Jamgön Mipham's Commentary on the Ninth Chapter of the Way of the Bodhisattva. Translated by The Padmakara Translation Group. Shambhala, 2017.
- Mipham's Sword of Wisdom: The Nyingmapa Approach to Valid Cognition. Khenchen Palden Sherab. Wisdom Publications 2018.
- A Feast of the Nectar of the Supreme Vehicle: An Explanation of the Ornament of the Mahayana Sutras. Padmakara Translation Group. Shambhala 2018.
- Wondrous Talk Brought about by Conversing with a Friend; the Four Dharma Traditions of the Land of Tibet; Profound Instruction on the View of the Middle Way; the Essence of Mind; the Essence of Wisdom: How to Sustain the Face of Rigpa; the Nature of Mind; Lamp to Dispel Darkness; and Advice to the Dodrup Incarnation, Jigme Tenpe Nyima in "Beyond the Ordinary Mind: Dzogchen, Rimé, and the Path of Perfect Wisdom". Translated by Adam Pearcey. Snow Lion, 2018.
- Sun-like Instructions of a Sage: A Clarification of Faith which Purifies the Pure Land, the Land of Bliss, in "Tibetan Pure Land Buddhism: Mipham Rinpoche on Self-Power and Other-Power". Translated by Lowell Cook. Vajra Books, 2019.
- Uprooting Clinging: A Commentary on Mipham Rinpoche's Wheel of Analytic Meditation. Khenchen Palden Sherab and Khenpo Tsewang Dongyal Rinpoche. Dharma Samudra, 2019.
- Gesar: Tantric Practices of the Tibetan Warrior King. Translated by Gyurme Avertin. Snow Lion, 2023.
- The Way of the Old Realized Ones, the Instructions Pointing Out the Nature of Mind, the Torch that Dispels Darkness; The Sadhana of Acala; and The Meditation and Recitation of the Six Syllable Avalokiteshvara, in "Pristine Awareness: Short Dzogchen Texts". Translated by Khenpo Gawang Rinpoche and Gerry Wiener. Jeweled Lotus Publications, 2023.
- A Complete Purification of Mind’s activity Called “The Wheel of Practice of Analytical Investigation (dPyad sgom ’khor lo)”; The Lamp Illuminating Reality, a Word Commentary of Refining Gold from Ore, the Practice of the Thought of Awakening (De kho na nyid gsal ba’ i sgron me); and Le’u bco brgyad ’grel (Commentary on the 18th chapter of Longchenpa's Wish-fulfilling Treasury), in "RADICAL NONDUALITY: JU MIPHAM NAMGYAL GYATSO'S DISCOURSE ON REALITY". Translated by Gregory Forgues. WIENER STUDIEN ZUR TIBETOLOGIE UND BUDDHISMUSKUNDE. 2024
- Mipham's White Lotus: A Pure Vision: Commentary on the Seven Line Prayer. Translated by Tulku Sherdor, Blazing Wisdom 2025.
- The Precious Jewel That Attracts Excellence and Abundance, in "The Tibetan Book of Success", translated by Orgyen Chowang, Shambhala, 2026.

=== Translations available online ===
- Lotsawa House - Mipham Rinpoche Series - Translations of several texts by Mipham Rinpoche.
- The Sugatagarbha Translation Group - texts by Ju Mipham Rinpoché
- Song of the Debate Between Wake and Dream A short teaching by Mipham Rinpoche.

== See also ==
- Mo (divination)

== Notes ==
=== Works cited ===
- Dharma Fellowship of HH the Gyalwa Karmapa. "The Life of Mipham Jamyang Namgyal (1846–1912)". Dharma Fellowship of HH the Gyalwa Karmapa. Archived from the original on 2012-07-01.
- Duckworth, Douglas (2008). Mipam on Buddha-Nature: The Ground of the Nyingma Tradition. Albany, NY: SUNY Press. ISBN 978-0-7914-7521-8.
- Duckworth, Douglas (2011). Jamgön Mipam: His Life and Teachings. Boston: Shambhala Publications. ISBN 978-1590306697.
- Germano, David (2002). "A Brief History of Nyingma Literature". THDL. Archived from the original on 2008-06-05.
- Pettit, John Whitney (1999). Mipham's Beacon of Certainty: Illuminating the View of Dzogchen, the Great Perfection. Boston: Wisdom Publications. ISBN 0-86171-157-2.
- Pettit, John W. (2002). Mipham's Beacon of Certainty: Illuminating the View of Dzogchen, the Great Perfection. Studies in Indian and Tibetan Buddhism. Vol. II.
- Phuntsho, Karma (2005). Mipham's Dialectics and Debates on Emptiness: To Be, Not to Be or Neither. Routledge Critical Studies in Buddhism. London: RoutledgeCurzon. ISBN 0-415-35252-5.
- Smith, E. Gene (2001). Among Tibetan Texts: History & Literature of the Himalayan Plateau. Somerville, MA: Wisdom Publications. ISBN 0-86171-179-3.
