= Gsung-'bum =

The Gsung-'bum (Tibetan: "collected works") are the collected Buddhist writings of a lama, specifically one from Mongolia or Tibet, as distinguished from the Bka'-'gyur and Bstan-'gyur.
