= Patsab Nyima Drakpa =

Patsab Nyima Drakpa (Tib. པ་ཚབ་ཉི་མ་གྲགས་པ་, Wyl. pa tshab nyi ma grags pa) (1055-1145?) was a Tibetan Buddhist scholar and translator of the Sarma (New Translation) era. He was a monk at Sangpu monastery and traveled to Kashmir where he translated Buddhist Madhyamika texts.

He is best known for being an important translator and exegete of Madhyamaka philosophy in Tibet, associating himself with what he called the "Prasangika" school and the views of Chandrakirti. He is thus considered to be the founder of the "Prasangika" school in Tibet and may have invented the Tibetan term thal 'gyur ba (which modern scholars have back translated to prasangika).

Patsab translated Nagarjuna's Mulamadhyamakakarika, Aryadeva's Four Hundred Verses, and Chandrakirti's Madhyamakavatara. Three commentary works are attributed to him, and they have recently been published in the "Selected Works of the Kadampas, volume II". Patsab's commentary on Nagarjuna's Mulamadhyamakakarika seems to be the first Tibetan commentary on this work.

== Sources ==
- Peer reviewed biography of Patsab Lotsawa by Gedun Rabsal on The Treasury of Lives
- Shakya Chokden, Three Texts on Madhyamaka, trans. Komarovski Iaroslav, Dharamsala: Library of Tibetan Works and Archives, 2002. p. 23.
- Karen Lang, 'Spa-tshab Nyi-ma-grags and the Introduction of Prâsangika Madhyamaka into Tibet' in Epstein, Reflections on Tibetan Culture: Essays in Memory of Turrell V. Wylie (1989) pp. 127–141.
- Leonard van der Kuijp, 'Notes on the Transmission of Nagarjuna's Ratnavali in Tibet', in The Tibet Journal, Summer 1985, vol. X, No.2,4
