= Madhyamakāvatāra =

The Madhyamakāvatāra (Wylie: dbu ma la 'jug-pa) is a text by Candrakīrti (600–c. 650) on the Mādhyamaka school of Buddhist philosophy. Candrakīrti also wrote an auto-commentary to the work, called the Madhyamakāvatārabhasya.

It is traditionally considered as a commentary on the meaning of Nagarjuna's Mūlamadhyamakakārikā and the Ten Stages Sutra (Daśabhūmika Sūtra). As such, within the Tibetan Buddhist canon this text is classified as commentarial literature.

== The text ==
The Madhyamakāvatāra relates the Mādhyamaka doctrine of śūnyatā to the "spiritual discipline" (Sanskrit: sādhanā) of a bodhisattva. The Madhyamakāvatāra contains eleven chapters, where each addresses one of the ten pāramitās or "perfections" fulfilled by bodhisattvas as they traverse the 'ten stages' (Sanskrit: bhūmi) to buddhahood, which is the final chapter.

== Commentarial literature ==
- The Madhyamakāvatārabhasya is Candrakīrti's own auto-commentary to the text.
- The Madhyamakāvatāraṭīkā is an elaborate 11th century commentary by the Indian scholar Jayānanda.
- Jamgon Ju Mipham Gyatso (1846–1912) wrote a commentary on the Madhyamakavatara entitled: dbu ma la 'jug pa'i 'grel pa zla ba'i zhal lung dri me shel phreng; the title has been rendered into English by Duckworth (2008: p. 232) as: Immaculate Crystal Rosary and by Padmakara Translations in it is titled The Word of Chandra: The Necklace of Spotless Crystal
- Khenpo Shenga, dbu ma la 'jug pa'i 'grel mchan legs par bshad pa zla ba'i 'od zer
- Khenpo Ngawang Palzang, dbu ma 'jug pa'i 'bru 'grel blo gsal dga' ba'i me long
- Jeffrey Hopkins (1980). Compassion in Tibetan Buddhism. Ithaca: Snow Lion. (first five chapters based on Tsongkhapa’s commentary)
- Rendawa Shonnu Lodro (1997). Commentary on the Entry into the Middle, Lamp which Elucidates Reality, translated by Stotter-Tillman & Acharya Tashi Tsering, Sarnath, Varanasi.

== English translations ==
- Fredrik Liland (trans) (2020). Madhyamakāvatāra (Bibliotheca Polyglotta) with Madhyamakāvatārabhasya and translations from Jayānanda's commentary.
- Geshe Rabten (translator, commentator) Stephen Batchelor (translator, editor) (1983). Echoes of Voidness, London : Wisdom Publications
- Huntington, C. W. (1989). The Emptiness of Emptiness. University of Hawaii Press
- Geshe Kelsang Gyatso. Ocean of Nectar: Wisdom and Compassion in Mahayana Buddhism. London: Tharpa Publications, 1995.
- Padmakara Translation Group (2002). Introduction to the Middle Way (Candrakirti's Madhyamakāvatāra with Mipham Rinpoche's Commentary). Shambhala
- Introduction to the Middle Way: Chandrakirti's Madhyamakavatara with commentary by Dzongsar Jamyang Khyentse Rinpoche, edited by Alex Trisoglio, Khyentse Foundation, 2003
- A translation of the Madhyamakavatara and its Auto-Commentary by Chandrakirti with additional commentary by Khenpo Namdrol Rinpoche

== See also ==
- Je Tsongkhapa
- Istituto Lama Tzong Khapa
