= Prasannapada =

The Prasannapada (IAST: Prasannapadā; Sanskrit: Clear words; Chinese: 淨明句論, Tibetan ཚིག་གསལ།) is a commentary on the Mūlamadhyamakakārikā of Nagarjuna by the 7th-century Indian Buddhist master, Chandrakirti. Its complete title is Mūlamadhyamakavṛtti-Prasannapadā.
