= Paltsek Research Institute =

Tibetan research institute

Paltsek Research Institute for Tibetan Ancient Texts
- dPal brtsegs bod yig dpe rnying zhib 'jug khang དཔལ་བརྩེགས་བོད་ཡིག་དཔེ་རྙིང་ཞིབ་འཇུག་ཁང་ / Baici Zangwen guji yanjiushi 百慈藏文古籍研究室
- Type: Private research organisation
- Purpose: Collection, preservation and study of Tibetan manuscripts and early printed works
- Region served: Tibet / China
- Official language: Tibetan

Paltsek Research Institute for Tibetan Ancient Texts (Tibetan: dPal brtsegs bod yig dpe rnying zhib 'jug khang་ དཔལ་བརྩེགས་བོད་ཡིག་དཔེ་རྙིང་ཞིབ་འཇུག་ཁང་; Chinese: Baici Zangwen guji yanjiushi 百慈藏文古籍研究室) in Lhasa is a private organisation dedicated to the collection, preservation, cataloguing, and study of Tibetan manuscripts and early printed works. It has rescued and systematized archives comprising nearly ten thousand volumes and several thousand fascicles of pre-17th-century Tibetan texts. Prior to the establishment of China's first public institution for Tibetan ancient texts in 2014, the institute was one of the most significant non-governmental actors in this field. The institute has also published important critical editions, and is well-known especially because of the voluminous series mes-po'i shul-bzhag (Tibetan: མེས་པོའི་ཤུལ་བཞག; Chinese: Xianzhe yishu 先哲遗书), which appeared in the China Tibetology Publishing House and received the China Government Award. It includes the Comparative edition of the Collected Works of the Five Sakya Founders (Sa skya gong ma lnga'i gsung 'bum) and many other works. An other series for example is phyag bris gces btus earlier works of Tibetan Buddhism.

== See also ==
- Institute of Tibetan Ancient Manuscripts, Tibet University (Chinese: 西藏大学藏文古籍研究所), founded in 2014
- Sezu Office for Collection and Compilation of Ancient Texts (Chinese: 色祖古籍搜集整理室), founded in 2007 by Sera Monastery and Jokhang
- Institute of Tibetan Classics, founded by Thupten Jinpa
- Library of Tibetan Works and Archives (LTWA)
