= Jetsun Chökyi Gyaltsen =

Tibetan scholar and logician (1469–1544)

Jetsun Chökyi Gyaltsen (Tibetan: rje btsun chos kyi rgyal mtshan; 1469–1544), commonly known as Jetsunpa (rje btsun pa), was a prominent scholar and logician of the Gelug school of Tibetan Buddhism. His scholastic works became standard textbooks at major Gelug monastic universities, including Ganden and Sera, and continue to influence the curriculum in several debate colleges.

Jetsunpa rose to intellectual authority in the early 16th century. His philosophical commentaries gradually replaced those of earlier Sera scholars, including the monastery’s founding figure Lodro Rinchen Sengge. Modern scholarship—particularly that of Elijah Sacvan Ary—highlights Jetsunpa’s role in reshaping the reception of Khedrub Je (Khedrub Geleg Pelsang), one of the principal disciples of Tsongkhapa. Jetsunpa's panegyrical Secret Biography of Khedrub Geleg Pelsang contributed to elevating Khedrub as a principal interpreter of Tsongkhapa’s teachings. Jetsünpa’s scholastic lineage continued through his disciple Khedrub Gendun Tenpa Dargye (Khas-grub dGe-'dun Bstan-pa Dar-rgyas; 1493–1568), whose works remain in use at the Sera Me College. Monastic colleges such as Sera Je, Ganden Jangtse, and the Shadupling Debate College of Kumbum Monastery (Ch. Ta'er si) still employ Jetsunpa's textbooks.

== Works ==
- Secret Biography of Khedrub Geleg Pelsang
- rJe btsun CHos kyi rgyal mtshan dpal bzang pos mdzad pa’i grub mtha’i rnam bzhag

== See also ==
- List of Works in the Curriculum of the Gelug School of Tibetan Buddhism (in German)

== Bibliography ==
- Elijah Sacvan Ary (2007). Logic, Lives, and Lineage: Jetsun Chokyi Gyaltsen’s Ascension and the “Secret Biography of Khedrup Geleg Pelzang”. Ph.D. dissertation, Harvard University
