= Chandrakirti =

Buddhist philosopher

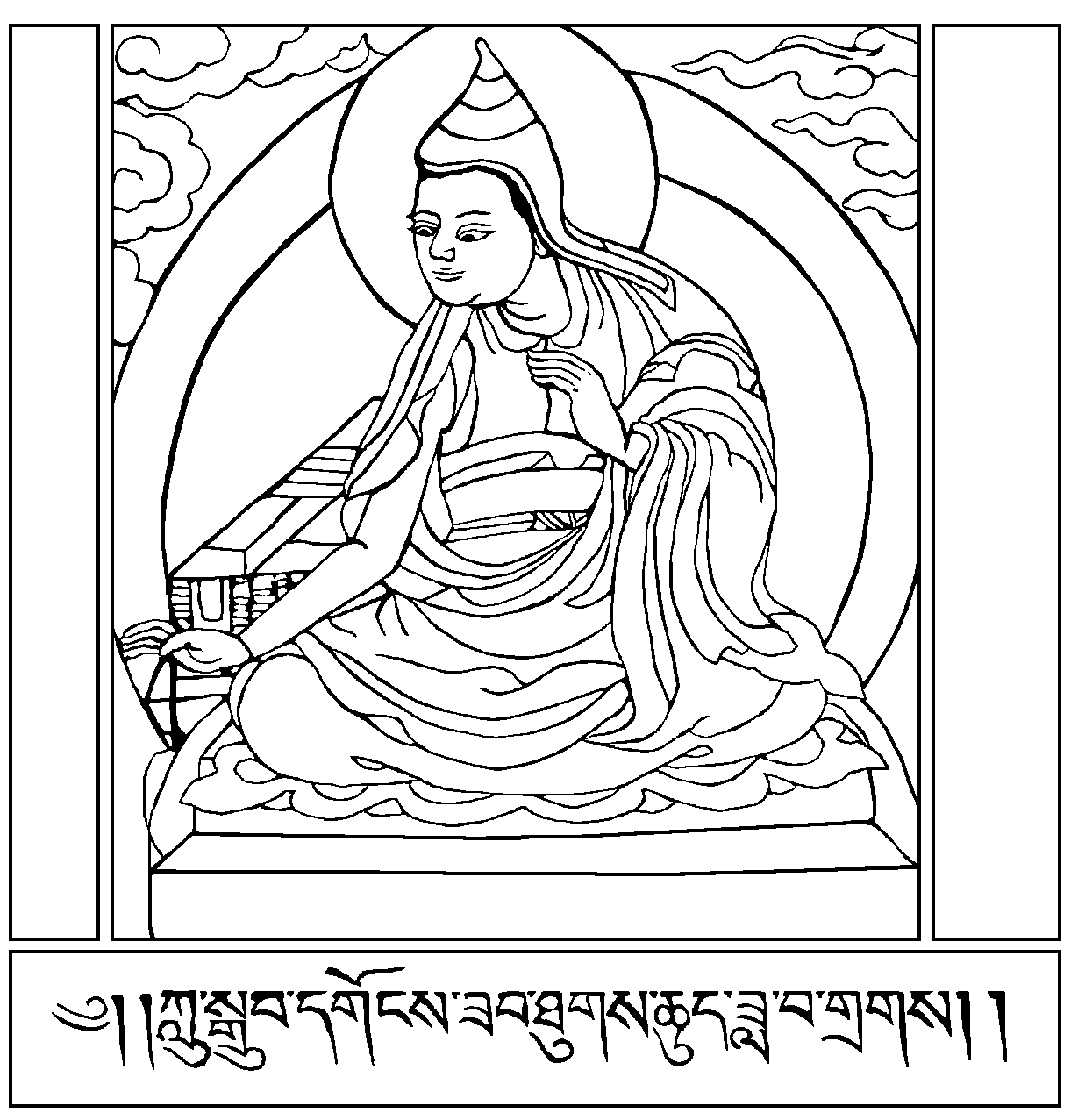
- traditional Chinese: 月稱; pinyin: Yuèchēng; Japanese: Gesshō; Tibetan: ཟླ་བ་གྲགས་པ་, Wylie: zla ba grags pa, Lhasa dialect: [tàwa ʈʰàʔpa]

Personal life
- Born: c. 600 CE South India
- Died: c. 670 CE
- Education: Nalanda

Religious life
- Religion: Buddhism
- School: Madhyamaka

Chandrakirti (IAST: Candrakīrti; Sanskrit: चंद्रकीर्ति; traditional Chinese: 月稱; c. 600 – c. 650, meaning "glory of the moon" in Sanskrit) or "Chandra" was a Buddhist scholar of the Madhyamaka school who was based out of the monastery of Nalanda. He was a noted commentator on the works of Nagarjuna (c. 150 – c. 250 CE) and those of his main disciple, Aryadeva. He wrote two influential works on Madhyamaka, the Prasannapadā and the Madhyamakāvatāra.

Chandrakirti does not seem to have been very influential during the 7th to 10th centuries, and his works were never translated into Chinese. However, by the 11th and 12th centuries, his work became influential in the north, especially in Kashmir and in Tibet. Over time, Chandrakirti became a major source for the study of Madhyamaka philosophy in Tibetan Buddhism. Chandrakirti's work was especially promoted by Tibetans like Rendawa Zhönnu Lodrö and his student Tsongkhapa as a way to counter the widespread influence of the Uttaratantra, and the shentong views associated with it.

As noted by Kevin A. Vose, Chandrakirti is seen by many Tibetan Buddhists as offering "the most thorough and accurate vision of Nāgārjuna's emptiness, which, in turn, most fully represents the final truth of the Buddha's teaching." He is considered by Tibetans to be the main exponent of what they term the "Prāsaṅgika" sub-school of madhyamaka. However, this doxographical categorization only arose in Tibet during the 12th century.

== Life ==
Very little is known about Chandrakirti's life, though Tibetan sources state that he was born in South India, became a Buddhist monk and was a student of Kamalabuddhi (who was the student of Buddhapalita). Tibetan sources like Bu ston and Taranatha state that Chandrakirti was active at Nalanda, where he is said to have become an abbot.

According to Karen Lang:

According to Bus ton and Taranatha, Candrakirti was born in south India and entered a monastery, where he mastered all the Buddhist scriptures. Taranatha adds that he was born in Samanta during the reign of King Sila, the son of Sriharsa. He took a special interest in Nagarjuna's treatises and studied them with the disciples of two rival interpreters, Bhavaviveka and Buddhapalita. He preferred Buddhapalita's interpretations of Madhyamaka teachings and defended them in a famous debate with the grammarian Candragomin, who supported the idealist position of the Vijñanavada (Doctrine of Consciousness) school.

Tibetan sources further add that during the latter period of his life, he returned to the South of India, where he stayed in the region of Koṅkuna. During his time here, he is said to have worked to defeat and convert many non-Buddhists.

=== Debate at Nalanda ===
Bu ston and Taranatha both reference a debate that took place at Nalanda between Chandrakirti and the poet-lay scholar, Chandragomin. The debate started after Chandrakirti noticed Chandragomin delivering a lecture to a large crowd on the topics of Pāṇinian grammar, sūtra, and tantra. Chandrakirti invited Chandragomin to come with him to Nalanda, where he could be enrolled into the sangha. However, due to a disagreement, a debate ensued between the two, with Chandrakirti arguing for the Madhyamaka position and Chandragomin taking on the Yogacara view. This debate was said to have attracted a large crowd. Over the course of the debate, Chandrakirti failed to defeat Chandragomin's position, and he began to suspect that someone was secretly teaching Chandragomin. Legend even states that Chandragomin was being tutored by the bodhisattva, Avalokiteśvara himself. Both Bu Ston and Taranatha record that the debate only ended after seven years, although neither writer specifies who the winner was.

== Philosophy ==
Chandrakirti was a philosopher of the madhyamaka school of Nagarjuna. This school held that all phenomena (dharmas) were empty of intrinsic nature or self-existence (Sanskrit: svabhāva). This includes all Buddhist phenomena including the Buddha, the four noble truths and nirvana. According to Chandrakirti, the apophatic method of madhyamaka is a thoroughgoing negation of all concepts, propositions (pratijñā) and views (dṛṣṭi) which affirms neither existence nor non-existence. Due to this radical negation, madhyamaka is seen as a middle way which rejects all extreme views and positions.

For Chandrakirti, even though all phenomena lack svabhāva, sentient beings impute svabhāva in their experience due to their ignorance about the true nature of reality. Ultimately, all phenomena are merely conceptual constructs (prajñaptimatra) which do not exist in themselves but are mentally imputed dependent designations (prajñāptirupādāya).

Thubten Jinpa outlines what has been seen by commentators as the main philosophical ideas put forth by Chandrakirti as follows:

(1) rejection of formal inference based on criteria grounded in objects facts of the world, relying instead on consequential reasoning that reveals logical contradictions and absurd consequences entailed by an opponent's positions, (2) rejection of the key tenets of the Buddhist epistemology initiated by Dignaga and developed further by Dharmakirti, (3) a radical understanding of the inaccessibility of ultimate truth through language and thought, (4) an understanding of conventional truth that appeals for its validity to everyday intuitions of the world instead of philosophical grounding, (5) a unique interpretation of Nagarjuna's statement about his having no thesis, and (6) the possible cessation of mind and mental factors in buddhahood.

=== Two Truths ===
Like all madhyamikas, Chandrakirti defends a theory of two truths with a strict anti-foundationalist character. According to Chandrakirti, all things (bhāva) have two natures, the conventional and the ultimate.

The conventional truth (saṁvṛti satya) is the fact that, provisionally speaking, phenomena have a nature or existence (bhāva). For example, a property of fire is heat and so on. This is the truth of the everyday world (lokasaṁvṛtisatya) and the truth of conventional transaction (vyavahārasatya). However, these conventional properties are not intrinsic natures or svabhāvas (even conventionally speaking), since for Chandra, even conventional truth is empty of intrinsic natures. This view differentiates Chandrakirti from other madhyamikas like Bhāviveka which affirm the conventional existence of intrinsic natures.

Regarding the ultimate truth (paramārtha satya), when fire is analyzed to find its ultimate nature, no independent essence is found that makes fire hot, and thus fire (and all things, including the most basic concepts like time and causality) have no ultimate essence or nature. This is the ultimate truth i.e. emptiness (śūnyatā) or the lack of self-existence (niḥsvabhāva). It is this very lack of inherent nature in conventional truth that allows it to change and have causal efficacy (arthakriya) and thus, to be a dependent arising (pratītyasamutpāda).

==== The nature of conventional truth ====
The conventional is the "domain of mundane cognitive process, and is readily accessible for ordinary beings" according to Sonam Thakchoe. The conventional truth can be contrasted with conventional falsehood based on erroneous cognitions. Correct cognition is differentiated from false cognitions by sense faculties that are not impaired. A related distinction which Chandrakirti makes is that between worldly conventions (lokasaṃvṛti), which are epistemically reliable from the point of view of ordinary beings and conventions that do not reflect the world (alokasaṃvṛti) and are thus deceptive even by worldly standards.

"Conventional" (saṁvṛti) can also mean "covering" according to Chandrakirti and is also associated with delusion or ignorance (avidyā). Furthermore, he also glosses the term as codependent (paraparasaṃbhavana) and as being signified (saṁket) or worldly convention (lokavyavahāra).

The conventional truth, especially as experienced by ordinary people (who reify reality), is a concealing and deluded kind of truth which may act as an obstacle to understanding the ultimate. From the ultimate point of view in fact, saṁvṛtisatya is not really true. Indeed, Chandrakirti explains that conventional phenomena are illusory and unreal and can be compared to a mirage. The only difference is that conventional phenomena have some causal efficacy from the mundane point of view (for example, water can help a thirsty person, a mirage cannot).

Furthermore, these conventional phenomena are to be differentiated from conventionally illusory entities, such as intrinsic natures or essences that are imputed on to things (which do not exist at all, even conventionally) and conventionally unreal entities (like the horns of a rabbit, which also do not exist at all). The main difference between these latter two unreal phenomena is that the conventionally unreal entities are understood to be unreal by ordinary people, whereas intrinsic nature is not understood to be unreal by ordinary persons. Instead, ordinary persons impute intrinsic nature on to conventional phenomena (such as water etc.) and perceive them as being intrinsically real (only noble beings realize that this is illusory). As such, intrinsic nature is a conceptual fiction in the minds of ordinary beings.

In spite of the unreality of the conventional, Chandrakirti states that the Buddha taught using language and conventional expressions as a way to guide people to the ultimate truth, which is beyond language and cannot be expressed through words.

For Chandrakirti, the way that ordinary beings experience the conventional is very different from the way that awakened saints or noble beings (āryas) experience the conventional. Chandrakirti introduced the concept of mere convention (Tibetan: kun rdzob tsam) to refer to how noble ones experience conventionality, which is quite different to what is held to be conventionally real or conventional true (kun rdzob bden pa). Ordinary beings grasp at and misconstrue phenomena as being intrinsically real, thus they experience conventional reality. Enlightened beings meanwhile, only experience a non-reified kind of appearance, which is perceived as being an unreal construct, like a reflected image.

==== The nature of the ultimate truth ====
Chandrakirti defines ultimate reality as "the nature of things found by particular exalted cognitive processes (yeshes) of those who perceive reality." He further defines it as follows:

“Ultimate is the object, the nature of which is found by particular exalted cognitive processes of those who perceive reality. But it does not exist by virtue of its intrinsic objective reality (svarūpatā / bdag gi ngo bo nyid)."

As such, the ultimate truth for Chandra is the nature of all conventional things that is found by a particular exalted perception which sees how things really are. However, as indicated by Chandra, this nature is also not truly real.

According to Chandrakirti, the ultimate truth, emptiness, is seen as having two aspects: selflessness of persons (pudgalanairātmya) and selflessness of phenomena (dharmanairātmya). Chandrakirti provides various arguments to show that persons, phenomena (dharmas) and emptiness itself are all unreal and empty.

The ultimate truth, the lack of self-nature in all phenomena, also refers to the fact that phenomena do not arise or cease at all. Even though conventional phenomena appear to arise and pass away through dependent arising, this appearance is in fact unreal and illusory. Thus, for Chandrakirti, the wisdom which realizes the ultimate truth is the realization that phenomena (dharmas) do not arise or come into being from themselves, from another thing, from both themselves and another thing, or without a cause. Just like Nagarjuna, Chandrakirti refutes all positions regarding the arising of phenomena, summing up his position as follows:

Entities do not arise causelessly, and they do not arise through causes like God, for example. Nor do they arise out of themselves, nor from another, nor from both. They arise codependently.

In this sense then, all phenomena are intrinsically unreal and like illusions, since they truly are not what they appear to be.

According to Chandrakirti, this very ultimate truth (i.e. emptiness and non-arising), is also empty, in the sense that it is also dependent on the provisional truth of dependent imputation. Another way to state this is that only what lacks inherent nature is dependently originated and causally efficacious.

Chandrakirti explains the emptiness of emptiness as follows:

The emptiness of intrinsic reality of things is itself called by the wise as ‘emptiness,’ and this emptiness also is considered to be empty of any intrinsic reality. The emptiness of that which is called ‘emptiness’ is accepted as ‘the emptiness of emptiness’ (śūnyatāśūnyatā). It is explained in this way for the purpose of controverting objectification of the emptiness as intrinsically real (bhāva).

Thus, according to Chandrakirti's doctrine of "the emptiness of emptiness", the ultimate truth is not some absolute reality, existential ground or ontological foundation, but refers to a mere absence of nature, and thus to the illusory and unreal character of things.

Because of the unreality of the conventional and the ineffability of the ultimate, Chandrakirti holds that madhyamikas do not formally put forth any elaborate theory of the conventional truth apart from the ordinary worldly experience that is accepted by worldly convention or common consensus. According to Chandrakirti, theories which seek to explain the workings of the conventional truth (like the metaphysics of samkhya or yogacara) actually obscure and undermine our understanding of conventional truth, since it is at variance with direct experience. These theories also undermine our understanding of the ultimate truth (which is the very nature of our experience) since the ultimate cannot be understood conceptually and can only be accessed through the gateway of one's conventional direct experience.

=== Prāsaṅga and reasoning ===
Chandrakirti defended Buddhapālita and his Madhyamaka method against the views of Bhāviveka. According to Chandra, Madhyamikas should not use autonomous or independent inferences (svatantrānumāna) when debating an opponent. This method had been developed by the Buddhist epistemologist Dignāga and had been adopted by madhyamikas like Bhāviveka. Bhāviveka had argued that to be able to accurately and effectively defend the madhyamaka view against its opponents, one needed to positively prove one's thesis by means of independent inferences (svatantrānumāna) in formal syllogisms (prayoga) which proved the madhyamika thesis in a self-contained manner independent of the views of non-madhyamika interlocutors. He therefore faulted Buddhapālita's analysis of madhyamaka as inadequate.

Chandrakirti critiqued Bhāviveka on this point and argued that madhyamaka thinkers should instead only rely on prāsaṅga arguments (literally "consequence"), which mainly refers to reductio arguments that seek to show how an opponent's views lead to absurd or unwanted consequences. Furthermore, these reductio arguments only refute the opponents position on the opponent's own terms. They do not put forth a counter-position in return nor do they commit the madhyamika to the principles and conclusions used in the course of the argument. In this sense, the madhyamikas merely point out the absurdity of their opponents views without stating a position of their own, and merely indicate the truth indirectly.

Chandrakirti states:

Whoever speaks in terms of independently valid logical arguments (inferences) reaps some fault. We do not rely on them, because the only fruit of our arguments is the annulment of someone else's thesis.

Chandrakirti argues that the idea that one must use the syllogistic arguments commits one to the acceptance of inherent natures or some other form of foundationalism or essentialism. He also points out that Nagarjuna did not make use of such arguments and relied on prāsaṅga. Chandrakirti sees figures like Bhāviveka as not really being madhyamikas, instead he sees them as logicians which "may take the side of the madhyamaka school out of a desire to parade the extent of his own dialectical skill." According to Chandrakirti, the philosophical practices of these logicians, motivated as they are by a desire for certainty and logic, becomes "an enormous reservoir where faults pile up one after another." Thus, Chandrakirti does not see Bhāviveka as being a madhyamika (unlike later Tibetan doxographers), but sees him as being a logician (tārkika), like other Buddhist thinkers such as Dignaga.

Another problem which Chandrakirti sees with the idea that a madhyamika must use independent syllogisms is that a madhyamika interlocutor and any essentialist or realist opponent do not share a basic set of premises required for syllogistic reasoning. This is because they do not have the same idea of what it means for something to "exist" and therefore they cannot even agree on a set of basic premises on which to develop an independent syllogism. The validity of any independent syllogism depends on the fact that the terminology it uses has the same meaning for both parties in the debate. However, this is impossible in a debate between a madhyamika and a realist according to Chandrakirti, since the very subject of debate is the nature of how the very objects of discussion are said to exist. Thus, a true madhyamika cannot put forth an independent syllogism which is not defective. Furthermore, if both parties use the same terminology but interpret them differently, they also lack a common understanding on which to ground a debate.

Prāsaṅga arguments meanwhile, are mainly negative, and thus do not require the affirmation of any positive thesis or view, but merely deconstructs the arguments of one's opponent. As such, Chandrakirti thinks prāsaṅga arguments are more suited to the apophatic method of madhyamaka philosophy. Indeed, according to Chandrakirti, madhyamaka presents no positive view at all and he cites Nagarjuna's Vigrahavyāvartanī in which he states "I have no thesis" in this regard.

Chandrakirti also critiques the view of the non-madhyamika epistemologists like Dignāga for having failed to provide a sufficiently indisputable foundation for their premises and for having failed to respond to Nagarjuna's criticism of the foundations of pramana in the Vigrahavyāvartanī.

There is a further problem with the view of the logicians and this is that, for Chandrakirti, all cognitions involve ignorance from an ultimate point of view and thus no cognition is fully reliable. Because of this, meditation on emptiness does not rely on an object at all (even the idea or view of emptiness) and ultimate truth is thus said to be beyond the ordinary mind. However, there is a role for reasoning in Chandrakirti's thought. Reasoning is only useful for negating all views regarding existence and non-existence. Furthermore, reasoning must also negate itself, because it also relies on conceptual proliferation (prapañca), which is based on ignorance. Thus, for Chandrakirti, reasoning and conceptual thought cannot know the ultimate truth, because the ultimate is beyond all concepts and discursive proliferation (prapañca). However, reasoning can be used to understand the very limitations of reason and thought in explaining the ultimate and how any attempt at conceptually understanding the ultimate leads to contradictions. Reason can thus indirectly point to the ineffable ultimate truth (which can only be realized by another means, i.e. through wisdom, jñana) by revealing what it is not.

=== Buddhahood ===
Chandrakirti's view of Buddhahood is related to his apophatic views. For Chandrakirti, a Buddha's knowing of emptiness is not really knowing anything at all. Instead, a Buddha's knowledge of emptiness is a non-knowing in which there is neither an object nor a mind engaged in the act of knowing the object. Because of this, Chandrakirti holds that for a Buddha, all mind and mental factors (cittacaitta) have ceased. Even though from the point of view of ordinary people, a Buddha seems to teach and engage in activities, from the point of view of a Buddha, no conscious decisions are being made and no cognition occurs. Yet, as Dunne notes, Chandrakirti thereby faces serious difficulties in explaining "the improbable state of affairs" by which a Buddha could teach and benefit sentient beings without any cognitive relation to the world.

=== Critiques of Yogācāra ===
In his Madhyamakāvatāra, Chandrakirti also offered refutations of a number of Buddhist views such as those of the vijñānavāda ("consciousness doctrine") or yogācāra school. Chandrakirti understood this tradition as positing a kind of subjective idealism. According to Chandrakirti, the yogācāra school fails to fully understand the empty nature of consciousness since they ontologically privilege consciousness over its objects. However, according to Chandrakirti, both are equally empty and neither have any ontological primacy or ultimate existence. Thus, for Chandrakirti, yogācāra fails to appreciate how everything, including consciousness, is conditioned and empty.

Chandrakirti also examines and refutes the basic theories of yogācāra, including the theory of the three natures and the theory of the storehouse consciousness. Chandrakirti cites the Laṅkāvatāra Sūtra in order to argue that the storehouse consciousness is a provisional teaching of indirect meaning (neyartha). He also critiques the yogācāra denial of an external object (bāhyārtha, bahirartha) of knowledge and the yogācāra theory of ‘self-awareness’ (svasamvedana, svasamvitti).

Furthermore, Chandrakirti interprets the various statements in the Mahayana sutras which seem to promote idealism in a different way than the yogācāra school. According to Chandrakirti, sutra teachings which state that "all is mind" and the like were taught by the Buddha as a way to counter the idea that our sufferings are caused by external forces and actors. According to Chandrakirti, to counter this wrong view and to help people understand that suffering mainly arises due to the way we understand our experience, the Buddha taught that all is mind (citta-matra) or idea/impressions (vijñapti-matra). Chandrakirti argues that it is a mistake to take this literally as an ontological statement and to conclude that only consciousness exists.

== Major works ==
Chandra's major works are:

- Mūlamadhyamaka-vṛtti-prasannapadā (Clear-word Commentary on the Fundamental Verses of the Middle Way), known simply as the Prasannapadā (Clear Words), A commentary on Nagarjuna's Mūlamadhyamakakārikā.
- Madhyamakāvatāra (Introduction to Madhyamaka), along with an auto-commentary, the Madhyamakāvatāra-bhāśya. The Madhyamakāvatāra is used as the main sourcebook by most of the Tibetan monastic colleges in their studies of Madhyamaka.
- Catuúṣataka-ṭika (Commentary on the Four Hundred): a commentary on the Four Hundred Verses of Aryadeva.
- Yuktiṣaṣṭhika-vṛtii (Commentary on the Sixty Stanzas on Reasoning), a commentary on Nagarjuna's Yuktiṣaṣṭhika.
- Śūnayatāsaptati-vṛtti (Commentary on the Seventy Stanzas on Emptiness), a commentary on Nagarjuna's Śūnayatāsaptati.
- Pañcaskandhaprakaraṇa (Discussion on the Five Aggregates).

== Later Influence and Commentaries ==
Only one Indian commentary on Chandrakirti exists, a 12th-century commentary to the Madhyamakāvatāra by the Kashmiri pandit Jayānanda. An earlier Indian author, Prajñakaramati (950–1030) repeadately cites the Madhyamakāvatāra in his commentary on Shantideva's Bodhisattvacaryāvatāra. The work of Atisha (982–1054), particularly his Introduction to the Two Truths (Satyadvayāvatāra), cites Chandrakirti and defends his view which rejects the applicability of valid cognition (pramana) to ultimate truth.

Another late Indian author which seems to have held Chandrakirti's position is Maitrīpadā (c. 1007–1085) and he is held to be one of the sources of the Kagyu school's Prāsaṅgika lineage. Chandrakirti is also cited in some late Indian Buddhist tantric works, such as the Compendium of Good Sayings, indicating that he may have been influential among Indian tantric authors, especially among the Arya lineage of the Guhyasamaja tantra. The Arya lineage includes the works of tantric authors who go by the names Nagarjuna, Aryadeva and Chandrakirti (the last two can be dated to the 9th or 10th centuries) and who should not be confused with the earlier Madhyamaka philosophers. Later Tibetan authors also began to believe that the tantric figures and the Madhyamaka philosophers were the same persons.

Another critical Indian author who refers to the work of Chandrakirti (and responds to it) is the later Bhāvaviveka or Bhāvaviveka II (author of the Madhyamakārthasaṃgraha and the Madhyamakaratnapradīpa), not to be confused with the first Bhāvaviveka (c. 500 – c. 578) who pre-dates Chandrakirti and authored the Madhyamakahrdaya and the Prajñāpradīpa. According to Ruegg, this might be the same person as the tantric Bhavyakīrti (c. 1000).

The first Tibetan translation of Chandrakirti's Madhyamakāvatāra and its auto-commentary was completed by Naktso Lotsawa, a student of Atisha. Another early Tibetan commentator on Chandrakirti was Patsab Nyima Drag (fl. 12th century), who also translator most of Chandra's major works. The logician Chapa Chökyi Sengé (12th century) is known for discussing the views of Chandrakirti and composing refutations of them in his defense of the epistemological tradition of Dharmakirti. Chapa's student, Mabja Changchub Tsöndrü (1109–1169) is also another important early figure who wrote on Chandrakirti. Mabja's work attempted to harmonize Dharmakirti's epistemology with Chandrakirti's Madhyamaka. Chandrakirti was categorized by Tibetans as part of the Uma Thelgyur (Wylie: dbu ma thal 'gyur) school, an approach to the interpretation of Madhyamaka philosophy typically back-translated into Sanskrit as Prāsaṅgika or rendered in English as the "Consequentialist" or "Dialecticist" school.

The influence of these early commentators lead to the increased popularity of Chandrakirti in Tibet. Later important Tibetan Buddhist figures like Tsongkhapa, Wangchuk Dorje (the 9th Karmapa) and Jamgon Mipham also wrote commentaries on the Madhyamakāvatāra.

== Other Chandrakirtis ==
The Tibetan translation of Charyapada provided the name of its compiler as Munidatta, that its Sanskrit commentary is Caryāgītikośavṛtti, and that its lotsawa "translator" was Chandrakirti. This is a later Chandrakirti, who assisted in Tibetan translation in the Later Transmission of Buddhism to Tibet.

The author of the Triśaraṇasaptati (Seventy Verses on Taking Refuge) is also called Chandrakirti, but this does not seem to be the same person as the 7th century Chandrakirti. The same is the case with the author of the Madhyamakāvatāra-prajñā.

There is also another figure called Chandrakirti or Chandrakirtipada. This is the author of the Pradīpoddyotana, a commentary on the Guhyasamāja Tantra. As such, he is sometimes called the "tantric Chandrakirti".

== See also ==
- Buddhapālita
- Bhāviveka
- Śāntideva
