= Mūlamadhyamakakārikā =

Foundational text of the Madhyamaka school of Mahāyāna philosophy

The Mūlamadhyamakakārikā (Devanagari: मूलमध्यमककारिका, lit. 'Verses on the Root of the Middle Way'), abbreviated as MMK, is the foundational text of the Madhyamaka school of Mahāyāna Buddhist philosophy. It was composed by the Indian philosopher Nāgārjuna (around roughly 150 CE).

The MMK makes use of reductio arguments to show how all phenomena (dharmas) are empty of svabhava (which has been variously translated as essence, own-being, or inherent existence). The MMK is widely regarded as one of the most influential and widely studied texts in the history of Buddhist philosophy. The MMK had a major impact on the subsequent development of Buddhist thought, especially in Tibetan Buddhism and East Asian Buddhism.

== Background ==
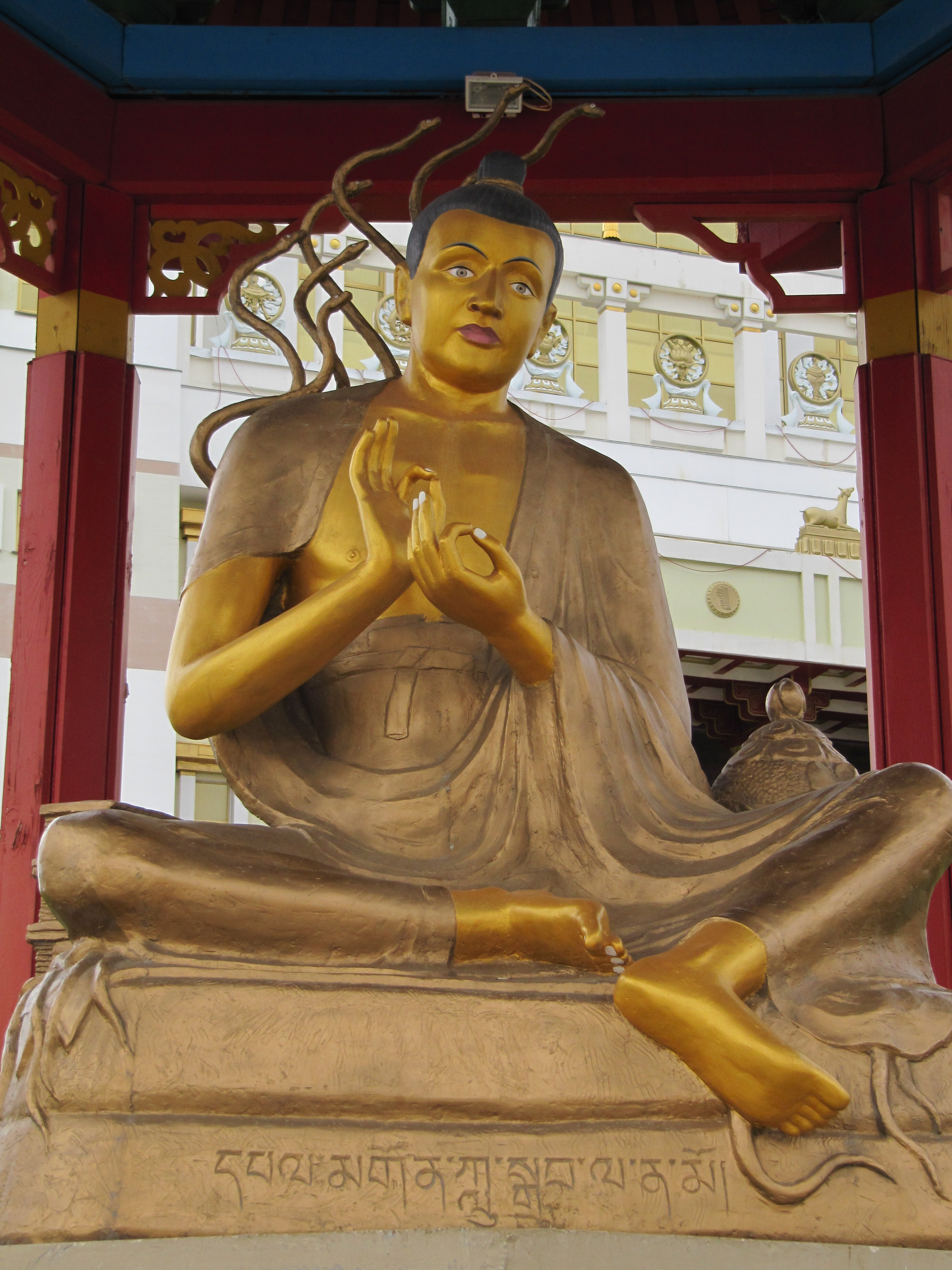
A modern statue of Nāgārjuna, protected by the Nagas, snake spirits who are said to be the guardians of the Prajñāpāramitā sūtras.

The MMK is the work of Nāgārjuna, an Indian Buddhist monk and philosopher writing in Sanskrit. Very little is known about this figure, including exactly where he lived (somewhere in the Indian subcontinent), exactly what time (some time around the 2nd or 3rd century CE), and how many texts he composed. As with many early Indian historical figures, the biographical information which does exist is mainly hagiographical and from later periods. Most scholars agree that Nāgārjuna was a Mahāyāna Buddhist who believed all things (dharmas) to be empty, or without an intrinsic existence and nature (svabhāva). Beyond that, little can be said about him with certainty.

During the second and third centuries, Mahāyāna ideas were held by a minority of Buddhists in India who lived within the communities of Nikāya Buddhism (i.e. non-Mahāyāna Buddhism). Although all the major Buddhist schools at the time held that the person was empty of any eternal self or soul, some of the Abhidharma schools conceived of dharmas (transient phenomena, impermanent events) as ultimately real entities (dravyata) that had essences or "intrinsic natures" (svabhāva). These intrinsic natures were seen as an independent part of a phenomenon, an inherent self-sufficiency that was not caused by something else. Abhidharma schools like the Vaibhasikas accepted this doctrine and did not see it as conflicting with the idea of dependent origination.

In the Mūlamadhyamakakārikā, Nāgārjuna sought to refute these essentialist ideas found in Buddhist traditions such as Vaibhasika and Pudgalavada, as well as in Brahmanical schools of thought like Nyaya who also defended an essence based metaphysics. As such, his philosophy is also often termed Niḥsvabhāvavāda (the no svabhāva doctrine).

Nāgārjuna's main contention with svabhāva theories was that they contradicted the fundamental Buddhist doctrine of dependent origination (pratītyasamutpāda). Furthermore, essence theories are not in agreement with the Mahāyāna sutras Nāgārjuna would have been familiar with. These sutras, particularly the Prajñāpāramitā sūtras, teach a kind of comprehensive illusionist ontology that sees all dharmas, even nirvana and Buddhahood, as being empty and like an illusion. This illusionism was not totally new, since similar ideas about emptiness can be found in the early Buddhist texts (see: Samyutta Nikaya 22:95, as well as Samyukta Āgama 335 and 297). However, the Prajñāpāramitā texts are unique in seeing all dharmas, including nirvana, as empty and like illusions. The MMK cites the Kaccānagotta Sutta, an early Buddhist text, from which it draws one of its major ideas regarding the middle way: the explanation of "right-view" as being a middle way between saying that "everything exists" (referring to the view of permanent existence: Pali: atthitā, Skt. astitva) and saying that "everything does not exist" (non-existence; Pali: n'atthitā, Skt nāstitva). This middle way is then defined as the 12 principles (dvādaśāṅga) of dependent origination.

Thus, Nāgārjuna's main project was to develop the philosophical position of the Buddha's teaching of dependent origination and not-self/emptiness as well as the ideas of the Prajñāpāramitā sūtras in a logical and systematic manner by refuting svabhāva theories and self theories.

== Content ==
The text is a series of 450 verses (karikas) organized into 27 chapters. The verses are aphoristic, often enigmatic, and extremely short. The text's arguments are presented in a highly compressed and concise form. This is because the text is a karika-style work. Such texts were meant to be memorized as an aid to learning by students. The text's arguments would be filled out through the oral commentary of a master. As such, the karikas are like a verse outline of the major philosophical arguments of an oral tradition.

The text seems to be mainly addressed to a Buddhist audience, particularly those who followed Abhidharma doctrines which held that dharmas are ultimately real and have svabhava (an intrinsic nature). The MMK takes up numerous Buddhist Abhidharma categories and ideas and examines them to show that they are empty and cannot have intrinsic nature. The MMK presents various arguments, mostly reductio in style, such as showing that an idea leads to an infinite regress.

The text begins with the following dedication verse:

I salute the Fully Enlightened One, the best of orators, who taught the doctrine of dependent origination, according to which there is neither cessation nor origination, neither annihilation nor the eternal, neither singularity nor plurality, neither the coming nor the going [of any dharma, for the purpose of nirvāṇa characterized by] the auspicious cessation of hypostatization.

The dedication sets out the main goal of the MMK, to eliminate conceptual proliferation, reification and hypostatization (prapañca), which expresses itself in different philosophical concepts such as essentialism, eternalism and annihilationism. The first chapter discusses causation. The main thesis to be defended is given in the first verse:

Not from itself, not from another, not from both, nor without cause: Never in any way is there any existing thing that has arisen.

To put it another way, the main thesis which Nāgārjuna will defend here is that phenomena (dharmas) do not come into being in any of the following four ways:

- By being self-caused, or due to the fact that the effect was already present in the cause (hetu). This view was called satkāryavāda.
- By being caused by something else (asatkāryavāda), the cause and the effect being distinct entities
- A combination of both of the above, i.e. the cause and the effect and both identical and different
- Acausality, phenomena originate without causes (ahetu)

The main view that MMK focuses on debating with is the second one, which is held by Buddhist Abhidharma theorists which put forth four main forms of conditionality: the primary cause (hetu-pratyaya), the objective support (ārambaṇa-pratyaya), the proximate condition (samanantara-pratyaya), and the dominant condition (adhipati-pratyaya). The MMK takes up each one in order to refute them, arguing that, for those who hold that cause and effect are distinct, the producing relation can only be a conceptual construction.

=== Chapter overview ===
The 27 chapters of the MMK are as follows:

1. Pratyayaparīkṣā: Analysis of conditions
2. Gatāgataparīkṣā: Analysis of going and not going
3. Cakṣurādīndriyaparīkṣā: Analysis of the eye and the other sense-organs
4. Skandhaparīkṣā: Analysis of the skandhas ("aggregates")
5. Dhātuparīkṣā: Analysis of the dhatūs ("constituents")
6. Rāgaraktaparīkṣā: Analysis of desire and the desirous
7. Saṃskṛtaparīkṣā: Analysis of the constructed
8. Karmakārakaparīkṣā: Analysis of action and actor
9. Pūrvaparīkṣā: Analysis of the past
10. Agnīndhanaparīkṣā: Analysis of fire and fuel
11. Pūrvaparakoṭiparīkṣā: Analysis of initial and final limits
12. Duḥkhaparīkṣā: Analysis of suffering
13. Saṃskāraparīkṣā: Analysis of mental constructions
14. Saṃsargaparīkṣā: Analysis of admixture
15. Svabhāvaparīkṣā: Analysis of own-nature
16. Bandhanamokṣaparīkṣā: Analysis of bondage and liberation
17. Karmaphalaparīkṣa: Analysis of action (karma) and its fruit
18. Ātmaparīkṣā: Analysis of the self (atman).
19. Kālaparīkṣā: Analysis of time
20. Sāmagrīparīkṣā: Analysis of combination
21. Saṃbhavavibhavaparīkṣā: Analysis of becoming and un-becoming
22. Tathāgataparīkṣā: Analysis of the Tathāgata.
23. Viparyāsaparīkṣā: Analysis of Error
24. Āryasatyaparīkṣā: Analysis of the Noble Truths
25. Nirvānaparīkṣā: Analysis of nirvāṇa
26. Dvādaśāṅgaparīkṣā: Analysis of the twelve links (of dependent origination)
27. Dṛṣṭiparīkṣā: Analysis of views

The authenticity of the last two chapters is disputed, and they may have been later additions, not composed by Nāgārjuna. However, most ancient commentaries take them to be canonical.

Different scholars divide up the work into different main parts. According to Jay Garfield, the MMK can be divided into four main sections:

1. Chapters 1 through 7, which focus on the fundamental theoretical constructs in Buddhist ontology, such as dependent origination, change and impermanence, perception, the five aggregates, the elements or properties of things, and the relation between substance and attribute. All of these are shown to be empty of own-nature or essence.
2. Chapters 8 through 13 focus on the nature of the self and of subjective experience.
3. Chapters 14 through 21 are mainly concerned with the external world and the relation of the self to objects.
4. Chapters 22 through 27 discuss phenomena associated with the ultimate truth, such as buddhahood, emptiness, and nirvana (it is argued that all of these are also empty), as well as the relation of the conventional truth to the ultimate phenomena.

== Commentaries ==
As a kārikā-style text, the Mūlamadhyamakakārikā presents only aphoristic, often enigmatic and extremely short verses, much like the sūtra works of the various Hindu philosophical schools. Since they served primarily as pedagogical or mnemonic aids for teachers, commentaries were required to make the meaning of this type of text more explicit to the uninitiated reader.

According to the Indian author Avalokitavrata, eight commentaries were written on the MMK: Nagarjuna's self-commentary, and those of Buddhapalita, Candrakirti, Devasharman, Gunashri, Gunamati, Sthiramati, and Bhavaviveka. Not all of these have survived in full or in the original. Devasharman and Gunamati's commentaries only survive in fragments and nothing is known of Gunashri's.

The Indian commentary called the Akutobhayā, whose authorship is unknown, though is attributed to Nagarjuna in the tradition, is held by Ames to be the earliest commentary on the MMK. C.W. Huntington has suggested that this commentary may not have been considered a separate text, but instead may have been a set of notes which may go back to oral explanations of the root text by Nāgārjuna himself.

The earliest known commentary on the MMK by another author is preserved within the first Chinese translation of the Kārikā, known as the "Middle Treatise" (中論 Zhong Lun), translated by Kumarajiva in 409. The author of this commentary is given as either "Blue Eyes" (青目; back translated as *Vimalākṣa) or *Piṅgala (賓伽羅). This is by far the best known commentary in the East Asian Mādhyamaka tradition, forming one of the three commentaries that make up the Sanlun ("Three Treatise") school. An influential figure of the Sanlun school is Jízàng (549–623), who wrote a commentary on the Middle Treatise in Chinese, the Zhongguanlun shu (中觀論疏).

Other surviving and influential Indian commentaries on the MMK include Buddhapālita's (c. 470–550) "Madhyamakvr̩tti" and Bhāviveka's (c. 500–578) "Prajñāpradīpa" (Lamp of Wisdom). These two survive in Tibetan translation.

The most influential commentary for Tibetan Buddhism is Candrakirti's (c. 7th century) Prasannapadā (Clear Words), which survives in Sanskrit and Tibetan translation.

An MMK commentary by the Indian Yogacara philosopher Sthiramati also survives in Chinese translation. This is the Commentary on the Mahāyāna Madhyamaka (Dasheng zhongguan shilun 大乘中觀釋論) which comments on the text from a Yogacara point of view.

In Tibet, various influential Tibetan language commentaries were written on the MMK. An early and important commentary is Ornament of Reason by Mabja Jangchub Tsöndrü (12th century). In the Gelug school, the key and definitive commentary is Je Tsongkhapa's (1357–1419) Ocean of Reasoning. Meanwhile, in the Nyingma school, the most important commentaries are by more recent figures, mainly Ju Mipham and Khenpo Shenga.

During the modern and contemporary periods, new commentaries have been written from different perspectives. David Kalupahana, a Sri Lankan scholar, wrote a commentary (Kalupahana 1986) which interprets the text from an early Buddhist perspective. Meanwhile, Jay Garfield has published an English translation and commentary (Garfield 1995) which, though influenced by Tibetan interpretations, also attempts to explain the text to Western philosophers. Gudo Nishijima wrote a commentary from a Soto Zen perspective, while Siderits and Katsura have published a translation and commentary (2013) which mainly follow the classical Sanskrit tradition.

== Modern scholarly interpretations ==
As noted by Ruegg, Western scholarship has given a broad variety of interpretations of Nagarjuna's Madhyamaka thought in the MMK, including: "nihilism, monism, irrationalism, misology, agnosticism, scepticism, criticism, dialectic, mysticism, acosmism, absolutism, relativism, nominalism, and linguistic analysis with therapeutic value".

Some of the main scholarly interpretations of Nagarjuna's MMK include the following:

- The Kantian interpretation, exemplified by Theodore Stcherbatsky’s "The Conception of Buddhist Nirvāna" (1927). This Kantian interpretation saw Nagarjuna as dividing the world into a realm of appearance or phenomenon (saṃsāra) and a realm of absolute reality or noumenon (nirvāṇa). This is also seen in T. R. V. Murti's 1955 "The Central Philosophy of Buddhism".
- The Pyrrhonian skeptic interpretation. Some scholars, such as Thomas McEvilley, have either argued that Nagarjuna was influenced by Greek Pyrrhonism or see Nagarjuna's Madhyamaka as similar to that of Pyrrhonist philosophers such as Sextus Empiricus.
- The analytic interpretation, exemplified by Richard Robinson's 1957 article “Some Logical Aspects of Nāgārjuna’s System”, sought to explain Madhyamaka using analytic philosophy's logical apparatus. Richard P. Hayes meanwhile, using analytical logic, critiques Nagarjuna as irrational and as relying on "fallacies and tricks".
- The Pragmatist interpretation, exemplified by David Kalupahana's translation and commentary of the MMK.
- The Wittgensteinian interpretation, exemplified by Frederick Streng's "Emptiness" and Chris Gudmunsen's "Wittgenstein and Buddhism", which stressed the similarities between Nāgārjuna and the later Wittgenstein's linguistic philosophy.
- American philosopher Mark Siderits has defended a svātantrika position.
- Garfield, Napper, Hopkins, have adopted Gelug prāsaṅgika influenced interpretation. Jay Garfield has defended the use of modern logic to interpret Nagarjuna's MMK.
- C.W. Huntington criticizes the reading of Nagarjuna through the use of modern analytical logic, since he sees Nagarjuna as "distrustful of logic". He puts forth a more literary interpretation that focuses on the effect Nagarjuna was attempting to "conjure" on his readers (i.e. an experience of having no views).
- Jan Westerhoff, argues that Nagarjuna's thought is a kind of anti-foundationalism, "which does not just deny the objective, intrinsic, and mind-independent existence of some class of objects, but rejects such existence for any kinds of objects that we could regard as the most fundamental building-blocks of the world."

== Translations ==
| Author | Title | Publisher | Date | ISBN | Notes |
|---|---|---|---|---|---|
| Richard Jones | Nagarjuna: Buddhism's Most Important Philosopher | Jackson Square Books | 2014 | ISBN 978-1502768070 | Translation from the Sanskrit of the Mūlamadhyamakakārikā and Nagarjuna's other available Sanskrit texts. |
| Mark Siderits and Shōryū Katsura | Nāgārjuna's Middle Way: Mūlamadhyamakakārikā | Wisdom Publications | 2013 | ISBN 978-1-61429-050-6 | A new translation from the Sanskrit. Sanskrit verses are presented in Roman characters prior to their translations. The authors have created a brief running commentary that conveys interpretations given in extant Indian commentaries in order to capture the early Indian perspectives on the work. |
| Gudo Wafu Nishijima and Brad Warner | Fundamental Wisdom of the Middle Way: Nagarjuna's Mulamadhyamakakarika | Monkfish Book Publishing | 2011 | ISBN 978-0-9833589-0-9 | A modern interpretation from a Zen perspective. |
| Mabja Jangchub Tsöndrü | Ornament of Reason: The Great Commentary to Nagarjuna's Root of the Middle Way | Snow Lion | 2011 | ISBN 978-1-55939-368-3 | Commentary translated by The Dharmachakra Translation Committee. |
| Padmakara Translation Group | The Root Stanzas on the Middle Way | Éditions Padmakara | 2008 | ISBN 978-2-916915-44-9 | A translation from the Tibetan, following (but not including) the commentary of the Nyingma and Rimé master Jamgön Mipham Rinpoche. This volume, containing both the Tibetan text and translation, was made to mark the visit of the Dalai Lama to France in August 2008, and as a support for the teachings scheduled for that occasion. |
| Luetchford, Michael J. | Between Heaven and Earth - From Nagarjuna to Dogen | Windbell Publications | 2002 | ISBN 978-0-9523002-5-0 | A translation and interpretation with references to the philosophy of Zen Master Dogen. |
| Batchelor, Stephen | Verses from the Center | Diane Publishing | 2000 | ISBN 978-0756760977 | Batchelor's translation is the first nonacademic, idiomatic English version of the text. |
| McCagney, Nancy | Nagarjuna and the Philosophy of Openness | Rowman & Littlefield | 1997 | ISBN 978-0-8476-8626-1 | Romanized text, translation and philosophical analysis. |
| Garfield, Jay L. | The Fundamental Wisdom of the Middle Way | Oxford University Press | 1995 | ISBN 978-0-19-509336-0 | A translation of the Tibetan version together with commentary. |
| Bocking, Brian | Nagarjuna in China: A Translation of the Middle Treatise | Edwin Mellen Press | 1995 | ISBN 978-0-7734-8981-3 | Kumarajiva's Chinese version with commentary by Blue Eyes. |
| Kalupahana, David J. | Nagarjuna: The Philosophy of the Middle Way | State University of New York Press | 1986 | ISBN 978-81-208-0774-7 | Romanized text, translation, and commentary. Interpretation of the text in the light of the Canon. |
| Sprung, Mervyn | Lucid Exposition of the Middle Way | Prajna Press, Boulder | 1979 | ISBN 978-0-7100-0190-0 | Partial translation of the verses together with Chandrakirti's commentary. |
| Inada, Kenneth K. | Nagarjuna: A Translation of his Mulamadhyamakakarika With an Introductory Essay | The Hokuseido Press | 1970 | ISBN 978-0-89346-076-1 | Romanized text and translation. |
| Streng, Frederick | Emptiness: A Study in Religious Meaning | Abdingdon Press | 1967 | (predates ISBN) | Translation and considerable analysis. |

== Quotations ==
=== 1:1 ===
Neither from itself nor from another,
Nor from both,
Nor without a cause,
Does anything whatever, anywhere arise.

=== 15:9 ===
If intrinsic nature does not exist, of what will there be alteration?
If intrinsic nature does exist, of what will there be alteration?

=== 15:10 ===
अस्तीति शाश्वतग्राहो नास्तीत्युच्चेददर्शनं
astīti śāśvatagrāho nāstītyuccedadarśanaṁ

To say "it is" is to grasp for permanence. To say "it is not" is to adopt the view of nihilism.

तस्माद् अस्तित्वनास्तित्वे नाश्रीयेत विचक्षणः।
tasmād astitvanāstitve nāśrīyeta vicakṣaṇaḥ

Therefore a wise person does not say "exists" or "does not exist".

=== 16:10 ===
न निर्वाणसमारोपो न संसारापकषणम्
na nirvāṇasamāropo na saṁsārāpakaṣaṇam
यत्र कस्तत्र संसारो निर्वाणं किं विकल्प्यते
yatra kastatra saṁsāro nirvāṇaṁ kiṁ vikalpyate

Where there is neither an addition of nirvana nor a removal of samsara; There, what samsara is discriminated from what nirvana?

=== 18:6–12 ===
ātmetya api prajñapitam anātmetyapi deśitam

Although (the term) "self" is caused to be known (of, about), and although (a doctrine or teaching of) "no self" is taught,

buddhair nātmā na cānātmā kaścid ity api deśitaṁ| 6

No "self" or any "nonself" whatsoever has been taught by the Buddhas.

nivṛtam abhidhātavyaṁ nivṛtte cittagocare

The designable is ceased when/where the range of thought is ceased,

anutpannāniruddhā hi nirvāṇam iva dharmatā| 7

Nirvana is like phenomenality, unarisen and unstopping.

sarvaṁ tathyaṁ na vā tathyaṁ tathyaṁ cātathyam eva ca

Everything is actual, or not actual, or actual and not actual

naivātathyaṁ naiva tathyam etad buddhānuśāsanaṁ| 8

Or neither actual nor not actual; this is the Buddha's teaching.

aparapratyayaṁ śāntaṁ prapañcair aprapañcitaṁ

Independent, peaceful, not delusionally diversified by delusional diversification

nirvikalpam anānārtham etat tattvasya lakśaṇaṁ| 9

Devoid of mental construction, without variation, this is the mark of thatness.

pratītya yad yad bhavati na hi tāvat tad eva tad

Whatsoever becomes dependently, is not insofar, that and only that.

na cānyad api tat tasmān noccinnaṁ nāpi śāśvataṁ| 10

Nor is it the other; therefore, it is neither exterminated nor eternal.

anekārtham anānārtham anuccedam aśāśvatam

Not singular, not plural, not exterminated, not eternal,

etat tal lokanāthānāṁ bhuddhānāṁ śāsanāmṛtaṁ| 11

This is the immortal teaching of the Buddhas, lords of the world.

sambhuddhānām anutpāde śrāvakāṇāṁ punaḥ kśaye

And again, when the disciples are destroyed and full Buddhas do not arrive,

jñānaṁ pratyekabuddhānām asamsargāt pravartate|12

The gnosis (knowledge, etc.) of the independently enlightened Buddhas proceeds without association (with teachings).

=== 22:11 ===
"Empty" should not be asserted."Nonempty" should not be asserted.
Neither both nor neither should be asserted. They are only used nominally.

=== 22:16 ===
तथागतो यत्स्वभावस्तत्स्वभावमिदं जगत्
tathāgato yat svabhāvas tat svabhāvam idam jagat

What is the nature of the thus-gone one (the Buddha), that is the nature of the world.

तथागतो निःस्वभावो निःस्वभावम् इदं जगत्। १६
tathāgato niḥsvabhāvo niḥsvabhāvam idaṁ jagat| 16

The thus-gone one is devoid of nature; the world is devoid of nature.

=== 24:18, 24:19 ===
Whatever is dependently co-arisen / That is explained to be emptiness.
That, being a dependent designation, / Is itself the middle way.

Something that is not dependently arisen / Such a thing does not exist.
Therefore a non-empty thing / Does not exist.

=== 25:19–20 ===
न संसारस्य निर्वाणात् किं चिद् अस्ति विशेषणं
na saṁsārasya nirvāṇāt kiṁ cid asti viśeṣaṇaṁ

There is nothing whatsoever of samsara distinguishing (it) from nirvana.

न निर्वाणस्य संसारात् किं चिद् अस्ति विशेषणं। १९
na nirvāṇasya saṁsārāt kiṁ cid asti viśeṣaṇaṁ| 19

There is nothing whatsoever of nirvana distinguishing it from samsara.

निर्वाणस्य च या कोटिः।कोटिः। संसरणस्य च
nirvāṇasya ca yā koṭiḥ koṭiḥ saṁsaraṇasya ca

(That?) is the limit which is the limit of nirvana and the limit of samsara;

न तयोर् अन्तरं किंचित् सुसूक्ष्मम् अपि विद्यते। २०
na tayor antaraṁ kiñcit susūkśmam api vidyate| 20

Even a very subtle interval is not found of (between) them.

=== 25:22–24 ===
śūnyeṣu sarvadharmeṣu kim anantaṁ kimantavat
kim anantam antavac ca nānantaṁ nāntavacca kiṁ| 22
kiṁ tad eva kim anyat kiṁ śāśvataṁ kim aśāśvataṁ
aśāśvataṁ śāśvataṁ ca kiṁ vā nobhayam apyataḥ 'tha| 23
sarvopalambhpaśamaḥ prapañcopaśamaḥ śivaḥ
na kva cit kasyacit kaścid dharmo buddhena deśitaḥ|

When all dharmas are empty, what is endless? What has an end?
What is endless and with an end? What is not endless and not with an end?
What is "it"? What is "other"? What is permanent? What is impermanent?
What is impermanent and permanent? What is neither?
Auspicious is the pacification of phenomenal metastasis, the pacification of all apprehending;
There is no dharma whatsoever taught by the Buddha to whomever whenever, wherever.

== See also ==
- Buddhist philosophy
- Madhyamaka
- Nāgārjuna
- Similarities between Pyrrhonism and Buddhism

== Sources ==
- Beckwith, Christopher I. (2015), Greek Buddha: Pyrrho's Encounter with Early Buddhism in Central Asia, Princeton: Princeton University Press
- Garfield, Jay L. (1995), The Fundamental Wisdom of the Middle Way, Oxford: Oxford University Press
- Kalupahana, David J. (1992), The Principles of Buddhist Psychology, Delhi: ri Satguru Publications
- Kalupahana, David J. (1994), A history of Buddhist philosophy, Delhi: Motilal Banarsidass Publishers Private Limited
- Kalupahana, David J (1991). Mulamadhyamakakarika of Nagarjuna: The Philosophy of the Middle Way, Motilal Barnasidass.
- Siderits, Mark; Katsura, Shoryu (2013). Nagarjuna's Middle Way: Mulamadhyamakakarika. Simon and Schuster
- Westerhoff, Jan (2018). The Golden Age of Indian Buddhist Philosophy. Oxford University Press
- Westerhoff, Jan (2009). Nagarjuna's Madhyamaka: A Philosophical Introduction. Oxford University Press
