= Ganden Tripa =

Title of the spiritual leader of Gelug Tibetan Buddhism

Religious life
- Religion: Tibetan Buddhism

Ganden Tripa

Tibetan name
- Tibetan: དགའ་ལྡན་ཁྲི་པ་
Transcriptions
- Wylie: dga' ldan khri pa

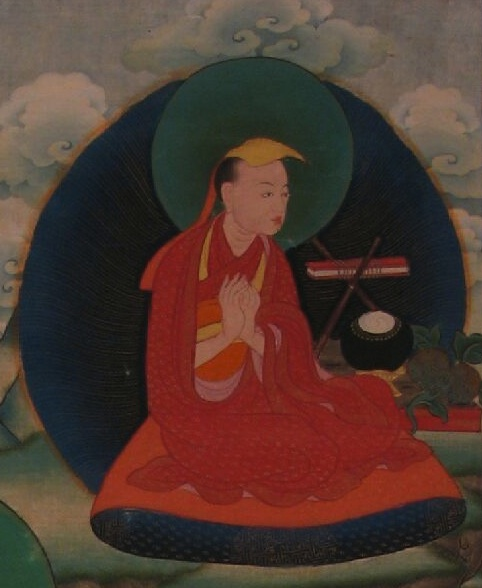
2nd Ganden Tripa Gyaltsab Je (1364–1432)

The Ganden Tripa, also spelled Gaden Tripa (Wylie: dga’ ldan khri pa "Holder of the Ganden Throne"), is the title of the spiritual leader of the Gelug school of Tibetan Buddhism, the school that controlled central Tibet from the mid-17th century until the 1950s. The 103rd Ganden Tripa, Jetsun Lobsang Tenzin, died in office on 21 April 2017. Currently, Jangtse Choejey Kyabje Jetsun Lobsang Tenzin Palsangpo is the 104th Ganden Tripa.

The head of the Gelugpa order is the Ganden Tripa and not, as is often misunderstood, the Dalai Lama. It is also often misunderstood that the Ganden Tripa is the same person as the abbot of Ganden monastery. Ganden has two abbots, the abbot of Ganden Shartse and the abbot of Ganden Jangtse, and neither of them can be the Ganden Tripa unless they have also served as abbot of Gyumay or Gyuto tantric colleges. See 'Mode of Appointment' below.

The Ganden Tripa is an appointed office directly by Lama Tsongkhapa to Gyaltsab Je, not a reincarnation lineage. It is awarded on the basis of merit which is the basis of his hierarchical progression. Since the position is held for only a 7-year term, there have been many more Ganden Tripas than Dalai Lamas to date (104 as against 14).

Je Tsongkhapa (1357–1419), who founded the Gelug, is the first Ganden Tripa. After Tsongkhapa's death, his teachings were held and kept by Gyaltsab Je and Khedrub Je who were the next abbots of Ganden monastery. The lineage has been held by the Ganden Tripas.

In January 2003, the Central Tibetan Administration announced the nomination of the 101st Ganden Tripa. An excerpt from that press release gives his background:

The 101st Ganden Tripa, Khensur Lungri Namgyel Rinpoche was born in 1927 in Kham (eastern Tibet). Ordained at eight years old, after fifty years of meditative practices and studies he was elevated by the Dalai-lama as successively abbot of Gyutö Tantric College (in 1983), and as abbot of Ganden Shartse Monastic University (in 1992). In 1986 he was the special envoy of the Dalai-lama to the ecumenical meetings of Assisi in Italy convened by Pope John Paul II. He is a French national and has been living in Paris, France, for more than 20 years. He transmits the Buddhist teachings of his lineage in a Dharma Center, Thar Deu Ling which he founded in 1980.

The 100th Ganden Tripa, Lobsang Nyima Rinpoche, retired and lived at Drepung Loselling Monastery with his labrang (office staff) until his death in 2008.

== Mode of appointment ==
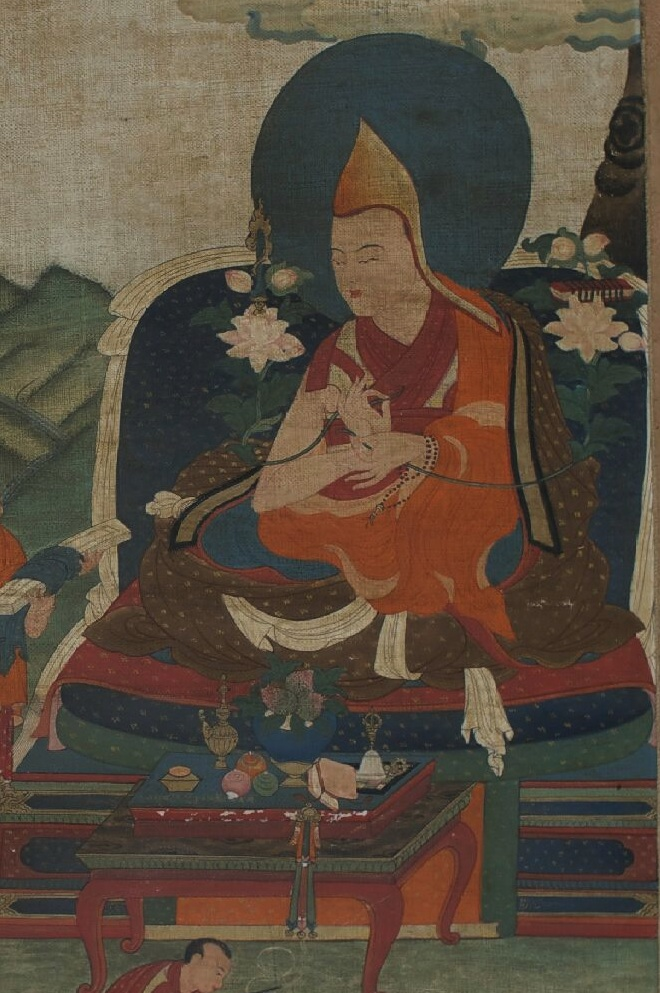
6th ganden tripa Chokyi Gyeltsen (1402–1473)

The Ganden Tripa is nominated or appointed on the basis of a hierarchical progression based on merit, and the appointee does not necessarily have to have any direct connection with Ganden Monastery, although if he started as a Ganden monk he could have obtained his higher Geshe degree there and risen to be its abbot.

There is a traditional Tibetan saying: “If a beggar’s child has the ability, there is no stopping him becoming the Throne Holder of Ganden.” It means the post is obtained on merit alone, rather than by recognition as the incarnation of a teacher, or other means.

This, and the hierarchy through which any Gelugpa monk can rise up through the ranks on merit to become the Ganden Tripa is briefly described in the November 2011 edition of Me-Long, a journal published by the Norbulingka Institute, which is dedicated to the preservation of the Tibetan culture, and in full detail on "Study Buddhism". The progression can be summarised as follows: first of all, a monk of any Gelugpa monastery, who, after usually 15 to 20 years of study, achieves a Tsorampa or Lharampa (higher) Geshe degree, is obliged to enter either the Gyuto Tantric College or the Gyume Tantric College, depending on his place of origin in Tibet, to continue his studies. If, after one or two years further study he then qualifies as Ngagrampa Geshe, he can rise on merit to become a Geko or disciplinarian, then to become vice-abbot (tenure 3 years); then he can be chosen and appointed by the Dalai Lama as abbot of his respective college, with a tenure of a further 3 years.

On retirement as Abbot of Gyume or Gyuto, he becomes eligible to become, eventually, for former Gyume abbots the Jangtsey Chojey ("Dharma Master of the Northern Peak of Ganden Hill"), or for former Gyuto abbots the Sharpa Chojey ("Dharma Master of the Eastern Peak of Ganden Hill"). These are more elevated positions, above abbots and retired abbots, which are automatically accorded only to the senior-most surviving retired abbot, one from each respective college, with a tenure of 7 years.

The Ganden Tripa is an automatic appointment occurring once every 7 years, from one or the other of these two Chojeys or Dharma Masters, on an alternating basis. The incumbent Ganden Tripa stands down, and one of the two Chojeys is elevated. If the retiring Ganden Tripa is a former abbot of Gyume Tantric College, and thus a former Jangtsey Chojey, his replacement will be a former abbot of Gyuto Tantric College and thus the current Sharpa Chojey (and vice versa).

This appointment is automatic but is apparently confirmed by the Dalai Lama who, being the pre-eminent spiritual leader, publicly announces the appointment or nomination at the time of changeover. The Rizong Sre Rinpoche was the 102nd Ganden Tripa, he previously served as the abbot of both Gyume Tantric College and Drepung Loseling Monastery.

== List of Ganden Tripas ==
#	name	biographical data	tenure	Wylie transliteration	further titles
1.	Je Tsongkhapa, Lobsang Dragpa	1357–1419	1409–1419	tsong kha pa, blo bzang grags pa	Je Rinpoche (rje rin po che)
2.	Dharma Rinchen (Gyaltsab Je)	1364–1432	1419–1431	dar ma rin chen	–
3.	Khedrup Gelek Pelzang	1385–1438	1431–1438	mkhas grub rje dge legs dpal bzang	1st Panchen Lama
4.	Shalu Lochen Legpa Gyeltshen	1375–1450	1438–1450	zhwa lu lo chen legs pa rgyal mtshan	–
5.	Lodrö Chökyong	1389–1463	1450–1463	blo gros chos skyong	–
6.	Chökyi Gyeltshen	1402–1473	1463–1473	chos kyi rgyal mtshan	1st Tatsak Rinpoche (rta tshag rin po che)
7.	Lodrö Tenpa	1402–1476	1473–1476(79)	blo gros brtan pa	–
8.	Mönlam Legpa Lodrö	1414–1491	1480–1489	smon lam legs pa'i blo gros	–
9.	Lobsang Nyima	1439–1492	1490–1492	blo bzang nyi ma	–
10.	Yeshe Sangpo	1415–1498	1492–1498	ye shes bzang po	–
11.	Lobsang Dragpa	1422/1429–1511	1499–1511	blo bzang grags pa	–
12.	Jamyang Legpa Lodrö	1450–1530	1511–1516	jam dbyangs legs pa'i blo gros	–
13.	Chökyi Shenyen	1453–1540	1516–1521	chos kyi bshes gnyen	Also called Dharmamitra
14.	Rinchen Öser	1453–1540	1522–1528	rin chen 'od zer	–
15.	Panchen Sonam Dragpa	1478–1554	1529–1535	pan chen bsod nams grags pa	(gzims khang gong ma)
16.	Chökyong Gyatsho	1473–1539	1534–1539	chos skyong rgya mtsho	4th Lab Kyabgön (lab skyabs mgon)
17.	Dorje Sangpo	1491–1554	1539–1546	rdo rje bzang po	–
18.	Gyeltshen Sangpo	1497–1548	1546–1548	rgyal mtshan bzang po	–
19.	Ngawang Chödrag	1501–1551/1552	1548–1552	ngag dbang chos grags	–
20.	Chödrag Sangpo	1493–1559	1552–1559	chos grags bzang po	–
21.	Geleg Pelsang	1505–1567	1559–1565	dge legs dpal bzang	–
22.	Gendün Tenpa Dargye	1493–1568	1565–1568	dge 'dun bstan pa dar rgyas	–
23.	Tsheten Gyatsho	1520–1576	1568–1575	tshe brtan rgya mtsho	–
24.	Champa Gyatsho	1516–1590	1575–1582	byams pa rgya mtsho	–
25.	Peljor Gyatsho	1526–1599	1582–?	dpal 'byor rgya mtsho	–
26.	Damchö Pelbar	1523/1546–1599	1589–1596	dam chos dpal 'bar	–
27.	Sangye Rinchen	1540–1612	1596–1603	sangs rgyas rin chen	–
28.	Gendün Gyeltshen	1532–1605/1607	1603–?	dge 'dun rgyal mtshan	–
29.	Shenyen Dragpa	1545–1615	1607–1615	bshes gnyen grags pa	–
30.	Lodrö Gyatsho	1546–1618	1615–1618	blo gros rgya mtsho	5th Lab Kyabgön
31.	Damchö Pelsang	1546–1620	1618–1620	dam chos dpal bzang	–
32.	Tshülthrim Chöphel	1561–1623	1620–1623	tshul khrims chos 'phel	–
33.	Dragpa Gyatsho	1555–1627	1623–1627	grags pa rgya mtsho	–
34.	Ngawang Chökyi Gyeltshen	1571/1575–1625/1629	1623, 1627/1628(?)	ngag dbang chos kyi rgyal mtshan	–
35.	Könchog Chöphel	1573–1644	1626–1637	dkon mchog chos 'phel	–
36.	Tendzin Legshe	?–1664	1638?	bstan 'dzin legs bshad	–
37.	Gendün Rinchen Gyeltshen	1571–1642	1638–1642	dge 'dun rin chen rgyal mtshan	–
38.	Tenpa Gyeltshen	?–1647	1643–1647	bstan pa rgyal mtshan	–
39.	Könchog Chösang	?–1672/1673	1644(?)/1648–1654	dkon mchog chos bzang	–
40.	Pelden Gyeltshen	1601–1674	1651/1654/1655–1662	dpal ldan rgyal mtshan	–
41.	Lobsang Gyeltshen	1599/1600–1672	1658/1662–1668	blo bzang rgyal mtshan	–
42.	Lobsang Dönyö	1602–1678	1668–1675	blo bzang don yod	Namdak Dorje
43.	Champa Trashi	1618–1684	1675–1681	byams pa bkra shis	–
44.	Ngawang Lodrö Gyatsho	1635–1688	1682–1685	ngag dbang blo gros rgya mtsho	–
45.	Tshülthrim Dargye	1632–?	1685/1695–1692/1699	tshul khrims dar rgyas	–
46.	Ngawang Pelsang	1629–1695	?	ngag dbang dpal bzang	Chinpa Gyatsho
47.	Lobsang Chöphel	* 17th century	1699–1701	blo bzang chos 'phel	–
48.	Döndrub Gyatsho	* 17th century	1702–1708	don grub rgya mtsho	The 1st Ling Rinpoche
49.	Lobsang Dargye	* 17th century	1708–1715	blo bzang dar rgyas	–
50.	Gendün Phüntshog	?–1724	1715–1722	dge 'dun phun tshogs	–
51.	Pelden Dragpa	?–1729	1722–1729	dpal ldan grags pa	1st Hortsang Sertri (hor tshang gser khri)
52.	Ngawang Tshephel	1668–1734	1730–1732	ngag dbang tshe 'phel	–
53.	Gyeltshen Sengge	1678–1756	1732–1739	rgyal mtshan seng ge	1st Tsötritrül (gtsos khri sprul)
54.	Ngawang Chogden	1677–1751	1739–1746	ngag dbang mchog ldan	1st Reting Rinpoche (rwa sgreng)
55.	Ngawang Namkha Sangpo	1690–1749/1750	1746–1749/1750	ngag dbang nam mkha' bzang po	1st Shingsa Rinpoche (shing bza' )
56.	Lobsang Drimed	1683–?	1750–1757	blo bzang dri med	–
57.	Samten Phüntshog	1703–1770	1757–1764	bsam gtan phun tshogs	–
58.	Chakyung Ngawang Chödrag	1707–1778	1764–1778?	bya khyung ngag dbang chos grags	–
59.	Ngawang Chodrak	1710–1772	1771–1772	ngag dbang chos grags	–
60.	Lobsang Tenpa	1725–?	6 Jahre	blo bzang bstan pa	–
61.	Ngawang Tshülthrim	1721–1791	1778–1785	ngag dbang tshul khrims	1st Tshemon Ling Rinpoche (tshe smon gling)
62.	Lobsang Mönlam	1729–1798	1785–1793	blo bzang smon lam	–
63.	Lobsang Khechog	1736–1792	1792 (6 months)	blo bzang mkhas mchog	–
64.	Lobsang Trashi	1739–1801	1794–1801	blo bzang bkra shis	–
65.	Gendün Tshülthrim	1744–1807	?	dge 'dun tshul khrims	–
66.	Ngawang Nyandrag	1746–1824	1807–1814	ngag dbang snyan grags	–
67.	Jamyang Mönlam	1750–1814/1817	1814 (3 months)	'jam dbyangs smon lam	–
68.	Lobsang Geleg	1757–1816	1815–1816	blo bzang dge legs	–
69.	Changchub Chöphel	1756–1838	1816–1822	byang chub chos 'phel	Yongzin Trijang Dorje Chang
70.	Ngawang Chöphel	1760–1839	1822–1828	ngag dbang chos 'phel	
71.	Yeshe Thardo	1756–1829/1830	1829–1830	ye shes thar 'dod	–
72.	Jampel Tshülthrim	* 19th century	1831–1837	'jam dpal tshul khrims	1st Khamlung Rinpoche khams lung
73.	Ngawang Jampel Tshülthrim Gyatsho	1792–1862/1864	1837–1843	ngag dbang 'jam dpal tshul khrims rgya mtsho	2nd Tshemon Ling
74.	Lobsang Lhündrub	* 18th century	?	blo bzang lhun grub	–
75.	Ngawang Lungtog Yönten Gyatsho	* 19 century–1853?	1850–1853	ngag dbang lung rtogs yon tan rgya mtsho	The 4th Ling Rinpoche
76.	Lobsang Khyenrab Wangchug	?–1872	1853–1870	blo bzang mkhyen rab dbang phyug	–
77.	Tshülthrim Dargye	?	1859?–1864?	tshul khrims dar rgyas	–
78.	Jamyang Damchö	* 19th century	1864?–1869?	jam dbyangs dam chos	–
79.	Lobsang Chinpa	* 19th century	1869?–1874?	blo bzang sbyin pa	–
80.	Dragpa Döndrub	* 19th century	1874?–1879?	grags pa don grub	–
81.	Ngawang Norbu	* 19th century	1879?–1884?	ngag dbang nor bu	–
82.	Yeshe Chöphel	* 19th century	1884?–1889?	ye shes chos 'phel	–
83.	Changchub Namkha	* 19th century	1889?–1894?	byang chub nam mkha'	–
84.	Lobsang Tshülthrim	* 19th century	1894?–1899?	blo bzang tshul khrims	–
85.	Lobsang Tshülthrim Pelden	1839–1899/1900	1896–1899/1900	blo bzang tshul khrims dpal ldan	Yongzin Trijang Dorje Chang
86.	Lobsang Gyeltshen	1840–?	1901–1907?	blo bzang rgyal mtshan	–
87.	Ngawang Lobsang Tenpe Gyeltshen	1844–1919	1907–1914	ngag dbang blo bzang bstan pa'i rgyal mtshan	3rd Tshemon Ling
88.	Khyenrab Yönten Gyatsho	* 19th century	1914?–1919	mkhyen rab yon tan rgya mtsho	Drigungpa Khyenrab Yönten
89.	Lobsang Nyandrag Gyatsho	* 19th century	1919?–1924?	blo bzang snyan grags rgya mtsho	–
90.	Champa Chödrag	1876–1937/1947	1920/1921–1926	byams pa chos grags	–
91.	Lobsang Gyeltshen	?–1932	1927–1932	blo bzang rgyal mtshan	–
92.	Thubten Nyinche	?–1933?	1933	thub bstan nyin byed	1st gtsang pa khri sprul
93.	Yeshe Wangden	* 19th century	1933–1939	ye shes dbang ldan	1st mi nyag khri sprul
94.	Lhündrub Tsöndrü	?–1949	1940–1946	lhun grub brtson 'grus	Shangpa Lhündrub Tsöndrü
95.	Trashi Tongthün	* 19th century	1947–1953	bkra shis stong thun	–
96.	Thubten Künga	1891–1964	1954/1958–1964	thub bstan kun dga	–
97.	Thubten Lungtog Tendzin Thrinle	1903–1983	1965–	thub bstan lung rtogs bstan 'dzin 'phrin las	The 6th Ling Rinpoche
98.	Jampel Shenpen	1919–1989	1984–1989	'jam dpal gzhan phan	–
99.	Yeshe Dönden	?–1995	?	ye shes don ldan	–
100.	Lobsang Nyima	* 1928-2008	1995–2003	blo bzang nyi ma	–
101.	Loungri Namgyél	1929–2025	2003–2009	lung rig rnam rgyal	–
102.	Thubten Nyima Lungtok Tenzin Norbu	1928–2022	2009–2016	thub bstan nyi ma lung rtogs bstan 'dzin nor bu	Rizong Sras Rinpoche (2nd ri rdzong sras sprul)
103.	Jetsun Lobsang Tenzin	1937–2017	2016–2017	rje btsun blo bzang bstan 'dzin	–
104.	Kyabje Jetsun Lobsang Tenzin Palsangpo	1935–2025	2017–2024	skyabs rje rje btsun blo bzang bstan 'dzin dpal bzang po	104th Trisur Rinpoche
105.	Jetsun Lobsang Dorjee Palsangpo	born 1937	2024–present	rje btsun blo bzang bstan rdo rje dpal bzang po	–
