= Lodrö Tenpa =

Tibetan spiritual leader

Lodrö Tenpa (Standard Tibetan: བློ་གྲོས་བརྟན་པ, (blo gros brtan pa)) (1402–1476) was a Tibetan spiritual leader. He was the seventh Ganden Tripa of the Gelug school of Tibetan Buddhism from 1473 to 1479.

Lodrö Tenpa was born at Shangdron Khang in Tsang (gtsang gi shangs mgron khang) in 1402. His teachers were Tsongkhapa and Gyeltsabje Darma Rinchen. He established a monastery in Southern Tibet called Dakpo Shedrubling, also known as Lamrim Dratsang.
