= Lodrö Chökyong =

Tibetan spiritual leader

Trichen Lodrö Chökyong (Standard Tibetan: བློ་གྲོས་ཆོས་སྐྱོང, (Wylie: blo gros chos skyong)) (1389–1463) was a Tibetan spiritual leader.

The fifth Ganden Tripa of the Gelug school of Tibetan Buddhism from 1450 to 1463, he was known as a Kalachakra scholar, wrote the Comprehensive Commentary on Kālacakra (Dus 'khor tik chen), and was a disciple of Tsongkhapa, Gyeltsap Darma Rinchen, and Khedrub Je.

Trichen Lodrö Chökyong's disciples included Tsangchung Chodrak; Paṇchen Zangpo Tashi (1410 - 1478/1479), the second throne-holder of Tashilhunpo; the First Pakpa Lha, Pakpa Dechen Dorje (1439–1487); and Norzang Gyatso (1423–1517).
