= Ngawang Chodrak =

Ngawang Chodrak (1710–1772, Tibetan: དགའ་ལྡན་ཁྲི་པ ༥༩ ངག་དབང་ཆོས་གྲགས།, Wylie: dga' ldan khri pa 59 ngag dbang chos grags) was the fifty-ninth Ganden Tripa. Born near Chubzang Monastery in Tolung near Lhasa and entered monastic life at a young age, eventually studying at Sera Me College (part of Sera Monastery) and Gyuto Tantric College where he excelled in both sutra and tantra. Known for his deep scholarship and ascetic lifestyle, he became abbot of Gyuto and Ganden Shartse (part of Ganden Monastery) before ascending to the Golden Throne of Ganden in 1771, where he led teachings and important religious ceremonies. He died in 1772 at age sixty, after sharing prophetic dreams of his death, which disciples interpreted as signs of his attainment of nirvana. His cremation revealed preserved relics, and a silver stupa was built to house them, while his disciples, including prominent figures, preserved his belongings as sacred objects.
