= Gyaltsab Je =

Gyaltsab Je (Tibetan: རྒྱལ་ཚབ་རྗེ་, Wylie: Rgyal tshab rje) (1364 – 1432) or more elaborately, Gyaltsab Dharma Rinchen was born in the Tsang province of central Tibet. He was a famous student of Je Tsongkhapa, and actually became the first Ganden Tripa (throne holder) of the Gelug tradition after Je Tsongkhapa's death. He also studied with Rendawa Zhonnu Lodro (red mda' ba gzhon nu blo gros, 1349–1412).

Gyaltsab Je was a prolific writer; one of his most famous texts is a commentary of Shantideva's A Guide to the Bodhisattva's Way Of Life. Lodrö Tenpa, the seventh Ganden Tripa, was his student.
