= Mönlam Legpa Lodrö =

Mönlam Legpa Lodrö (Standard Tibetan: སྨོན་ལམ་ལེགས་པའི་བློ་གྲོས, (smon lam legs pa'i blo gros)) (1402–1476) was a Tibetan spiritual leader. He was the eighth Ganden Tripa of the Gelug school of Tibetan Buddhism from 1480 to 1489.

He served as abbot of Ganden Shartse College (dga' ldan shar rtse grwa tshang) and Drepung Monastic University.
