= Jetsun Lobsang Tenzin =

103rd Ganden Tripa of the Gelug school of Tibetan Buddhism (1937–2017)

103rd Ganden Tripa Jetsun Lobsang Tenzin Rinpoche

Personal life
- Born: 1937 Yara, Dêqên, Eastern Tibet
- Died: 21 April 2017 (aged 80) Delhi, India

Religious life
- Religion: Tibetan Buddhism
- School: Gelug
- Monastic name: Lobsang Tenzin
- Profession: Geshe Lharampa Degree in 1982

Senior posting
- Present post: 103rd Ganden Tripa
- Previous post: Sharpa Chöje at the Ganden Monastery

103rd Ganden Tripa Jetsun Lobsang Tenzin Rinpoche (1937 – 21 April 2017) was the 103rd Ganden Tripa (spiritual leader) of the Gelug school of Tibetan Buddhism. He was appointed to the position by the Dalai Lama in 2016 and died in 2017.

== The Life of the 103rd Ganden Tripa ==
The 103rd Ganden Tripa Jetsun Lobsang Tenzin Rinpoche, who served as the head of the Gelug school of Tibetan Buddhism, was appointed by His Holiness the Dalai Lama in October 2016. He was enthroned on November 5, 2016, at Ganden Trithok Khang in Mundgod, India, succeeding Rizong Sey Thubten Nyima Lungtok Tenzin Norbu in the position.

According to the Central Tibetan Administration, the 103rd Ganden Tripa was born in 1937 in Eastern Tibet. He joined Tsem Monastery at age nine and later received his higher education at Drepung Loseling Monastic University. In 1959, he followed His Holiness into exile and continued his geshe studies in Buxa Duar, a former prison camp where refugee monks were housed for several years. When the major monasteries were reestablished in South India, he served Drepung Loseling Monastery in various capacities. He was awarded the Geshe Lharampa degree in 1982 and attended Gyuto Tantric College the following year. In 2003, he was enthroned as Sharpa Chöje at the Ganden Monastery.

== The death of the 103rd Ganden Tripa ==
The FPMT shared the news of the death of the 103rd Ganden Tripa Jetsun Lobsang Tenzin Rinpoche, who died on April 21, 2017, at 11:45 p.m. in Delhi, India, after an illness. According to the Central Tibetan Administration, the Ganden Tripa’s death was announced by Gelugpa members of the Tibetan Parliament in exile, who urged devotees to do special prayers for the Ganden Tripa.

Sikyong (Prime Minister) Dr. Lobsang Sangay, the head of the Tibetan government in exile, said, “With profound sadness, I on behalf of all Tibetans pray that Kyabje Jetsun Lobsang Tenzin Rinpoche will be reborn and carry forward his mission to spread the teachings of Lord Buddha and His Holiness the Dalai Lama. May he be reborn in Tibet, the land of snow.
