= Shalu Lochen Legpa Gyeltshen =

Shalu Lochen Legpa Gyaltsen (Standard Tibetan: ཞྭ་ལུ་ལོ་ཆེན་ལེགས་པ་རྒྱལ་མཚན, (Wylie: zhwa lo lu chen rgyal mtshan legs pa)) (1375–1450) was a Tibetan spiritual leader. He was the fourth Ganden Tripa of the Gelug school of Tibetan Buddhism from 1438 to 1450.

He was born in Tsang Zhalu (gtsang zhwa lu) in 1375, and was ordained at Zhalu Monastery (zhwa lu dgon pa). He was the first undze at Ganden Namgyel Ling (dga' ldan rmam rgyal gling).
