= Khensur Lungri Namgyel =

Tibetan Buddhist leader (1929–2025)

- Title: 101st Gaden Tripa

Personal life
- Born: Trisur Lungrik Namgyal; 1929 Kham, Tibet
- Died: 14 February 2025 (aged 95–96) Chelles, Seine-et-Marne, France

Religious life
- Religion: Buddhism
- School: Vajrayana
- Lineage: Gelug

Trisur Rinpoche Jetsun Lungrik Namgyal (1929 – 14 February 2025), also known as Khensur Lungri Namgyel, was a Tibetan Buddhist leader who was the 101st Gaden Tripa, the leader of the Gelug sect of Tibetan Buddhism.

== Biography ==
Namgyel was born in Kham in eastern Tibet in 1929. Ordained at eight years old, Venerable Rinpoche Lungrik Namgyal acquired the title of Geshe Lharampa and Geshe Ngarampa (specialist in tantra) after 40 years of intensive study and practice in all fields of Buddhist sutra and tantra including the Five Major Treatises of Buddhist Philosophy, as well as an extraordinary monastic education which included numerous sacred rituals. He died in Chelles, Seine-et-Marne, France on 14 February 2025.

== See also ==
- Ganden Monastery
