= Rizong Rinpoche =

Indian cleric (1928–2022)

- Ganden Trisur Rizong Sras Rinpoche
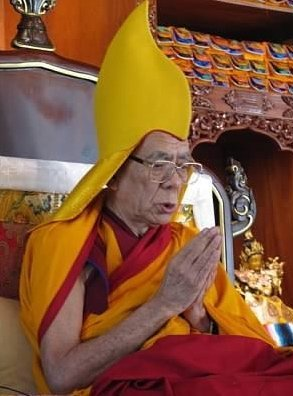
- Rizong Rinpoche in Atlanta 2013
- Born: 7 June 1928; Matho Palace, Ladakh, Jammu and Kashmir, British Raj
- Died: 8 December 2022 (aged 94); Drepung Monastery, Karnataka, India
- Father: Prince Phuntsog Namgyal
- Mother: Tsering Lhazom
- Religion: Tibetan Buddhism Gelug school

Rizong Sras Rinpoche (7 June 1928 – 8 December 2022), spiritual name Thubten Nyima Lungtok Tenzin Norbu, was an Indian cleric from Ladakh who was the 102nd Ganden Tripa (spiritual head of the Gelug school of Tibetan Buddhism) - finally titled as Ganden Trisur (which means "former-Ganden Tripa") Rizong Sras Rinpoche. Prior to becoming the Ganden Tripa, he was the Jangtse Chöje (trans. "Dharma master of the Northern Peak") Rinpoche from Gyüme Tantric College.

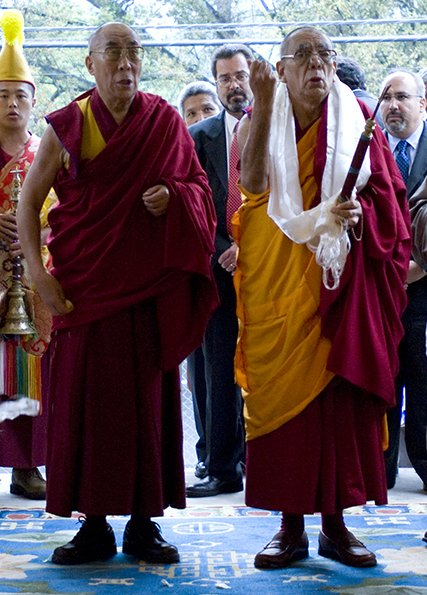
Rizong Rinpoche with the Dalai Lama in 2007

Rizong Rinpoche was born into the Royal House of Matho, a cadet branch of the Royal Family of Ladakh. His father was Prince Phuntsog Namgyal, a direct descendant of the Kings of Ladakh. Rizong Rinpoche's mother, Tsering Lhazom, was from the aristocratic Leh Kalon family. He was the nephew of the 19th Bakula Rinpoche.

In the early 1930s, as a child, Rizong Rinpoche was recognized as a tulku by the 13th Dalai Lama and enthroned as the reincarnation of the previous Sras Rinpoche, founder of the notably strict Rizong Hermitage in Ladakh. He was admitted to the monastery at the age of four. Known for his sharp intelligence, he memorized almost all the "Prayer Recitation" of the monastery by the age of eight. He undertook a retreat on the Buddha Amitayus and could bestow a long-life empowerment of Amitayus on his own at the age of eight when his peers were learning the alphabet. At the age of twelve the young Rizong Rinpoche was ordained as a novice monk by his uncle the Venerable Bakula Rinpoche.

In the year 1948 Rizong Rinpoche went to Tibet for his spiritual studies. In 1950, he was admitted to Drepung Loseling Monastery in Lhasa for his higher monastic training. At the age of 20, Rizong Rinpoche received his full monk's ordination from the 94th sitting Ganden Tripa Khrichang Lhündrub Tsöndrü. Rinpoche remained at Drepung Loseling until the Chinese takeover of Tibet in 1959. He then joined the 14th Dalai Lama and the Tibetan exile community in India. He was appointed by the 14th Dalai Lama as Abbot of Drepung Loseling (in 1984) and of Gyüme Tantric Monastery, two of the main Gelug monasteries. He has also been the Abbot of Samstanling Monastery near Sumur Village in the Nubra Valley of Ladakh.

Rizong Rinpoche made the practice of meditation and tantra his principal focus in life and conducted numerous extensive tantric retreats, including a three-year tantric retreat on the Yamantaka mandala in a hermitage in Ladakh so remote it was only accessible for about 3 months out of the year due to the heavy snows. Rinpoche was renowned for his knowledge of tantra and tantric rituals, and was frequently called upon by the 14th Dalai Lama to lead tantric ceremonies for healing and other similar purposes such as the site purification rituals for the Kalachakra empowerment.

Rizong Rinpoche died on 8 December 2022, at the age of 94.

On 13 July 2026, the young boy Jetsun Leksmon was received by the 14th Dalai Lama in a private audience at Shewatsel Phodrang in Leh, Ladakh, India. Leksmon has been described as the reincarnation of the 102nd Ganden Tripa, Kyabje Trisur Rizong Rinpoche.
