= Thubten Künga =

Thubten Künga (1886 – 1964) was a Tibetan religious leader, and the 96th Ganden Tripa, the spiritual head of the Gelug school of Tibetan Buddhism between 1954 and 1964.

== Biography ==
Thubten Künga was born in Shigatse. He gained his Geshe Lharampa degree during the 13th Dalai Lama's rule. He became an alternate Ganden Tripa in 1946, and the 96th Ganden Tripa in 1954. He was the president of the Tibetan branch of the Buddhist Association of China from 1956, and vice-president of the Buddhist Association of China from 1962.
