= Je Tsongkhapa =

Tibetan monk and yogi (1357–1419)

རྗེ་ཙོང་ཁ་པ་བློ་བཟང་གྲགས་པ། Je Tsongkhapa Lobsang Drakpa
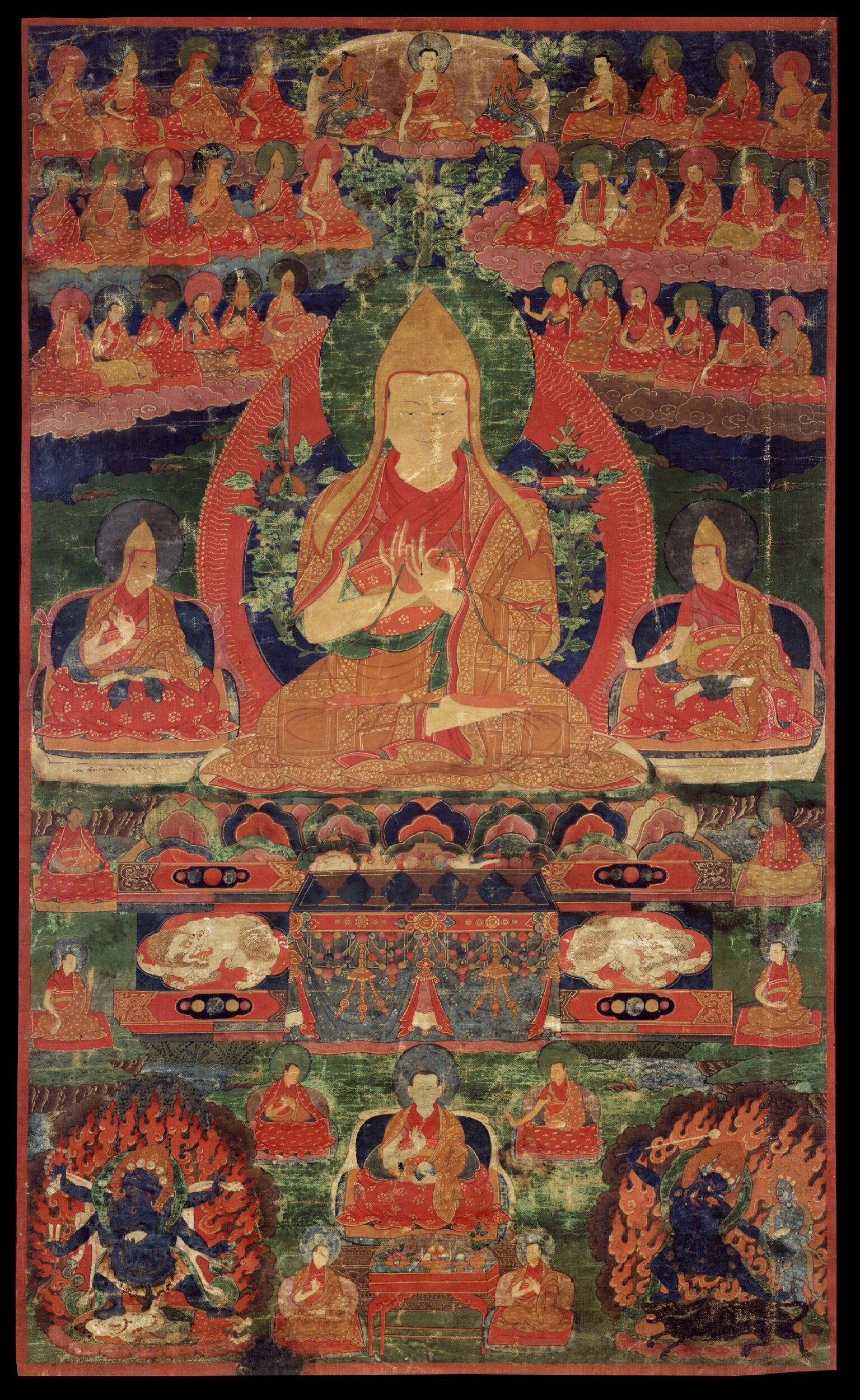
- Tsongkhapa, 16th century, Rubin Museum of Art
- Born: c. October, 1357 CE; Amdo
- Died: c. November 12, 1419 CE (aged 62–63); Ganden Monastery
- Occupations: Tibetan Buddhist teacher, monk, and philosopher
- Known for: Founder of the Gelug school, author of numerous works on Tibetan Buddhist thought and practice

Tsongkhapa (Tibetan: ཙོང་ཁ་པ་, [tsoŋˈkʰapa], meaning: "the man from Tsongkha" or "the Man from Onion Valley", c. 1357–1419) was an influential Tibetan Buddhist monk, philosopher, and tantric yogi, whose activities led to the formation of the Gelug school of Tibetan Buddhism.

His philosophical works are a grand synthesis of the Buddhist epistemological tradition of Dignāga and Dharmakīrti, the Cittamatra philosophy of the mind, and the madhyamaka philosophy of Nāgārjuna and Candrakīrti.

Central to his philosophical and soteriological teachings is "a radical view of emptiness" which sees all phenomena as devoid of intrinsic nature. This view of emptiness is not a kind of nihilism or a total denial of existence. Instead, it sees phenomena as existing "interdependently, relationally, non-essentially, conventionally" (which Tsongkhapa terms "mere existence").

Tsongkhapa emphasized the importance of philosophical reasoning in the path to liberation. According to Tsongkhapa, meditation must be paired with rigorous reasoning in order "to push the mind and precipitate a breakthrough in cognitive fluency and insight."

== Names ==
He is also known by his ordained name Losang Drakpa (Wylie: blo bzang grags pa, Skt. Sumatikīrti) or simply as "Je Rinpoche" (Wylie: rje rin po che, "Precious Lord").

He is also known in Chinese as Zongkapa Lobsang Zhaba or just Zōngkābā (宗喀巴). In Mongolian, he is known as Bogd Zonkhov (Богд Зонхов).

== Biography ==
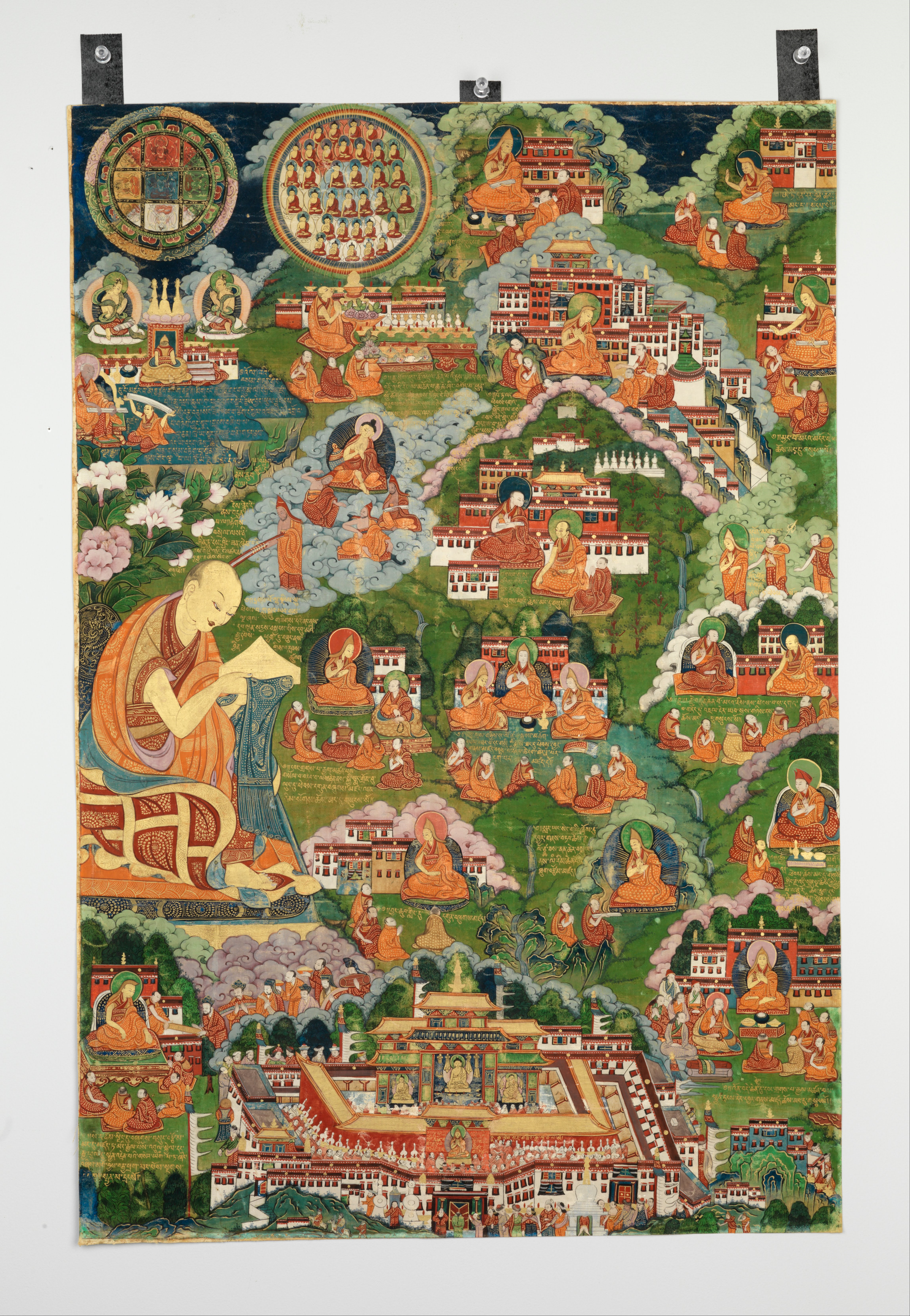
Painting depicting the life of Tsongkhapa, the largest image on the left showing the dream he had of the great Indian scholars like Buddhapalita

=== Early years and studies ===
With a Mongolian father and a Tibetan mother, Tsongkhapa was born into a nomadic family in the walled city of Tsongkha in Amdo, Tibet (present-day Haidong and Xining, Qinghai) in 1357. Tsongkhapa was educated in Buddhism from an early age by his first teacher, the Kadam monk Choje Dondrub Rinchen. Tsongkhapa became a novice monk at the age of six.

When he was sixteen, Tsongkhapa traveled to Central Tibet (Ü-Tsang), where he studied at the scholastic institutions of the Sangphu monastery, the Drikung Kagyu and the Sakya tradition of Sakya paṇḍita (1182–1251). At the Drikung Thil Monastery he studied under Chenga Chokyi Gyalpo, the great patriarch of Drikung Kagyu, and received teachings on numerous topics like Mahamudra and the Six Dharmas of Naropa. Tsongkhapa also studied Tibetan medicine, followed by all major Buddhist scholastic subjects including abhidharma, ethics, epistemology (Sk. pramāṇa), Vajrayana and various lineages of Buddhist tantra.

Tsongkhapa studied widely under numerous teachers from various Tibetan Buddhist traditions. His main teachers include: the Sakya masters Rendawa and Rinchen Dorje, the Kagyu master Chenga Rinpoche and the Jonang masters Bodong Chakleh Namgyal, Khyungpo Hlehpa and Chokyi Pelpa. Tsongkhapa also received the three main Kadampa lineages. He received the Lam-Rim lineage, the oral guideline lineage from the Nyingma Lama, Lhodrag Namka-gyeltsen, and lineage of textual transmission from Lama Umapa.

Rendawa Zhönnu Lodrö was Tsongkhapa's most important teacher. Under Rendawa, Tsongkhapa studied various classic works, including the Pramanavarttika, the Abhidharmakosha, the Abhidharmasamuccaya and the Madhyamakavatara. Tsongkhapa also studied with a Nyingma teacher, Drupchen Lekyi Dorje (Wylie: grub chen las kyi rdo je), also known as Namkha Gyaltsen (Wylie: nam mkha' rgyal mtshan, 1326–1401).

During his early years, Tsongkhapa also composed a few original works, including the Golden Garland (Wylie: legs bshad gser phreng), a commentary on the Abhisamayālaṃkāra from the perspective of the Yogācāra-svātantrika-madhyamaka tradition of Śāntarakṣita which also attempts to refute the shentong views of Dolpopa (1292–1361).

=== Retreats and visions of Mañjuśrī ===
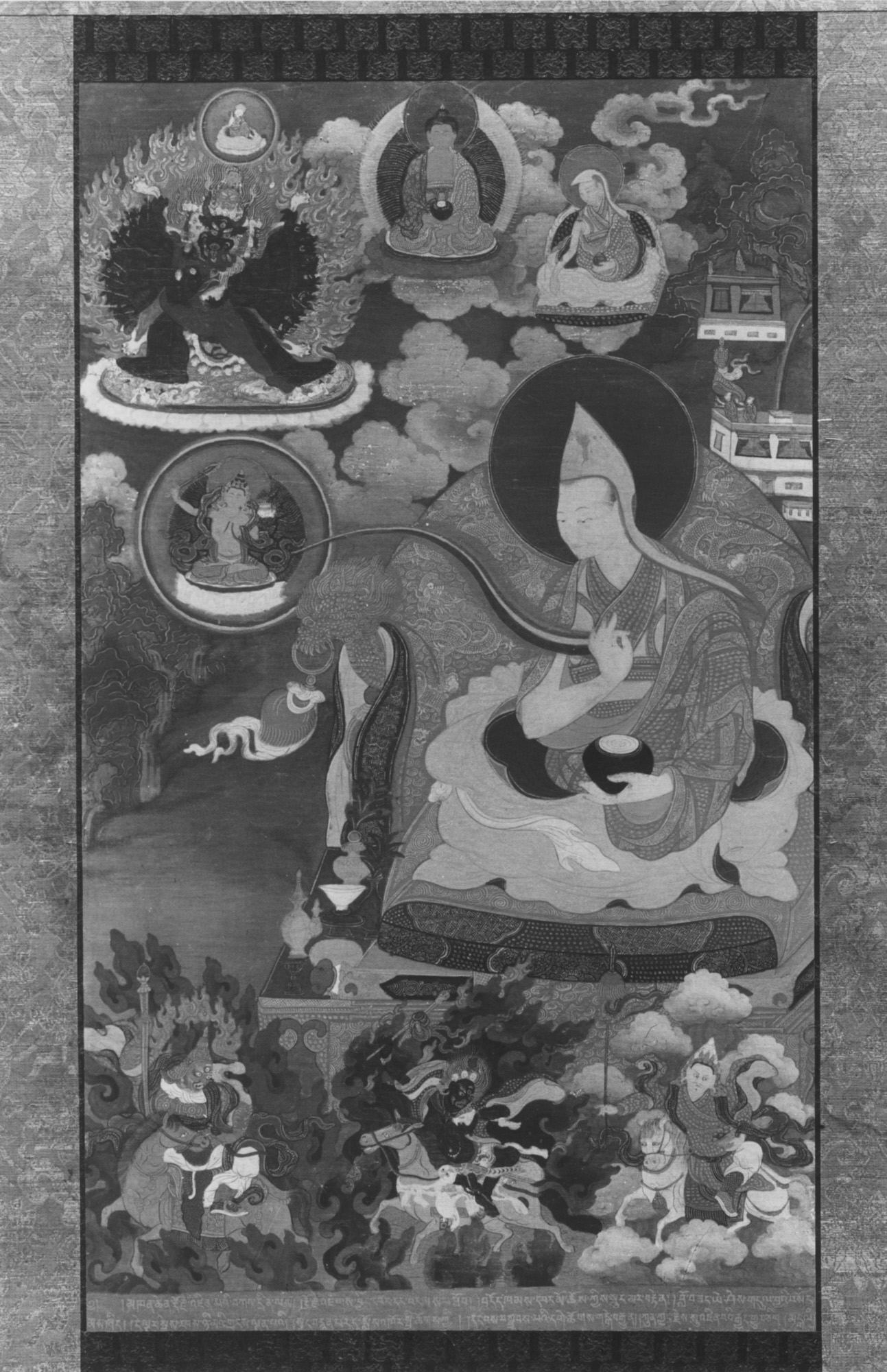
A depiction of Tsongkhapa communing with Mañjuśrī bodhisattva

From 1390 to 1398, Tsongkhapa engaged in extended meditation retreats with a small group of attendants in various locations, the most well known of which is in the Wölkha Valley. He also developed a close relationship with a mystic and hermit named Umapa Pawo Dorje, known for his connection to Mañjuśrī bodhisattva and his frequent visions of black Mañjuśrī, with whom he would communicate. Umapa acted as a medium for Tsongkhapa, who eventually began having his own visions of Mañjuśrī.

During this period of extensive meditation retreat, Tsongkhapa had numerous visions of guru Mañjuśrī (Jamyang Lama). During these visions he would receive teachings from the bodhisattva and ask questions about the right view of emptiness and Buddhist practice. An important instruction Tsongkhapa is said to have received about the view from Mañjuśrī is:

"It is inappropriate to be partial either to emptiness or to appearance. In particular, you need to take the appearance aspect seriously."

Tsongkhapa would also discuss these visions and instructions with his teacher Rendawa (and some record of this correspondence has survived). During this period, Tsongkhapa is also said to have received a series of oral transmissions from Mañjuśrī. These later came to be called the Mañjuśrī cycle of teachings.

In 1397, while in intensive meditation retreat at Wölkha Valley, Tsongkhapa writes that he had a “major insight” (ngeshé chenpo) into the view of emptiness. Initially, Tsongkhapa had a dream of the great madhyamaka masters: Nagarjuna, Buddhapalita, Aryadeva, and Candrakirti. In this dream, Buddhapālita placed a wrapped text on the top of Tsongkhapa's head. After waking from this dream, Tsongkhapa began to study Buddhapālita's commentary to Nagarjuna's Middle Way Verses. As he was reading chapter 18, his understanding became crystal clear and all his doubts vanished. According to Thupten Jinpa, "at the heart of Tsongkhapa’s breakthrough experience was a profound realization of the equation of emptiness and dependent origination." He then spent the next spring and summer in deep meditation, experiencing great bliss, devotion, and gratitude to the Buddha.

=== Mature Period ===
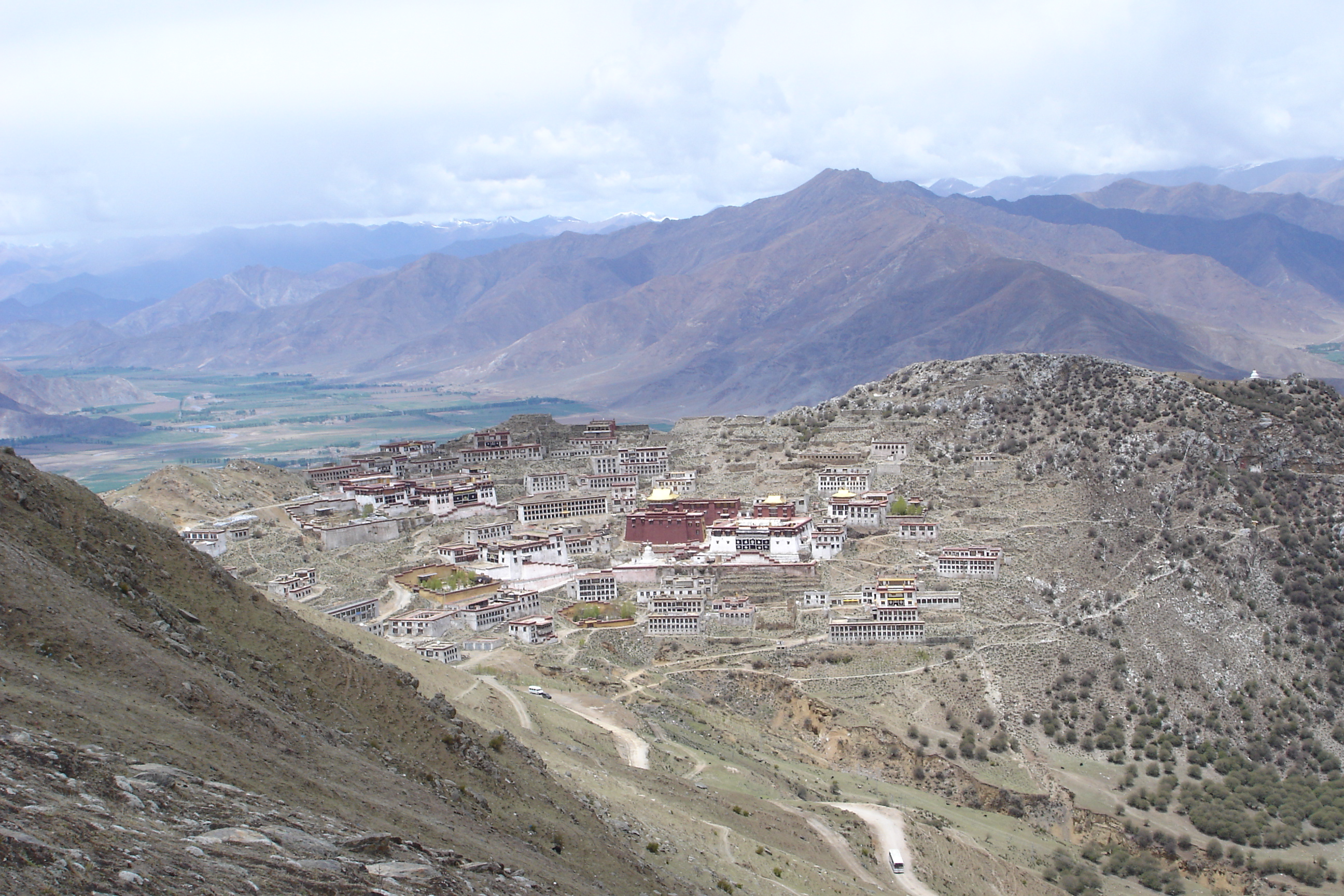
Ganden Monastery, Tibet

In the later period of Tsongkhapa's life, he composed a series of works on Buddhist philosophy and practice. His most famous work is the Great Exposition of the Stages of the Path (Lam rim chen mo, c. 1402). This lamrim ('stages of the path') text outlines the Mahayana path to enlightenment and also presents Tsongkhapa's view of emptiness and the middle way view (Madhyamaka). In 1405, he finished his Great Exposition of Tantra (Sngags rim chen mo).

Tsongkhapa also wrote other major works during this period, including Essence of Eloquence (Legs bshad snying po), Ocean of Reasoning (Rigs pa'i rgya mtsho, a commentary on Nagarjuna's classic Mūlamadhyamakakārikā), the Medium-Length Lamrim, and Elucidation of the Intent (dGongs pa rab gsal), his last major writing.

According to Garfield:

the major philosophical texts composed in the remaining twenty years of his life develop with great precision and sophistication the view he developed during this long retreat period and reflect his realization that while Madhyamaka philosophy involves a relentlessly negative dialectic — a sustained critique both of reification and of nihilism and a rejection of all concepts of essence—the other side of that dialectic is an affirmation of conventional reality, of dependent origination, and of the identity of the two truths, suggesting a positive view of the nature of reality as well.

In 1409, Tsongkhapa worked on a project to renovate the Jokhang Temple, the main temple in Lhasa. He also established a 15-day prayer festival, known as the Great Prayer Festival, at Jokhang to celebrate Sakyamuni Buddha. In 1409, Tsongkhapa also worked to found Ganden monastery, located 25 miles north of Lhasa. Two of his students, Tashi Palden (1379–1449) and Shakya Yeshey (1354–1435) respectively founded Drepung monastery (1416), and Sera Monastery (1419). Together with Ganden, these three would later become the most influential Gelug monasteries in Tibet and also the largest monasteries in the world. These institutions became the center of a new growing school of Tibetan Buddhism, the Ganden or Gelug sect.

=== Death and aftermath ===
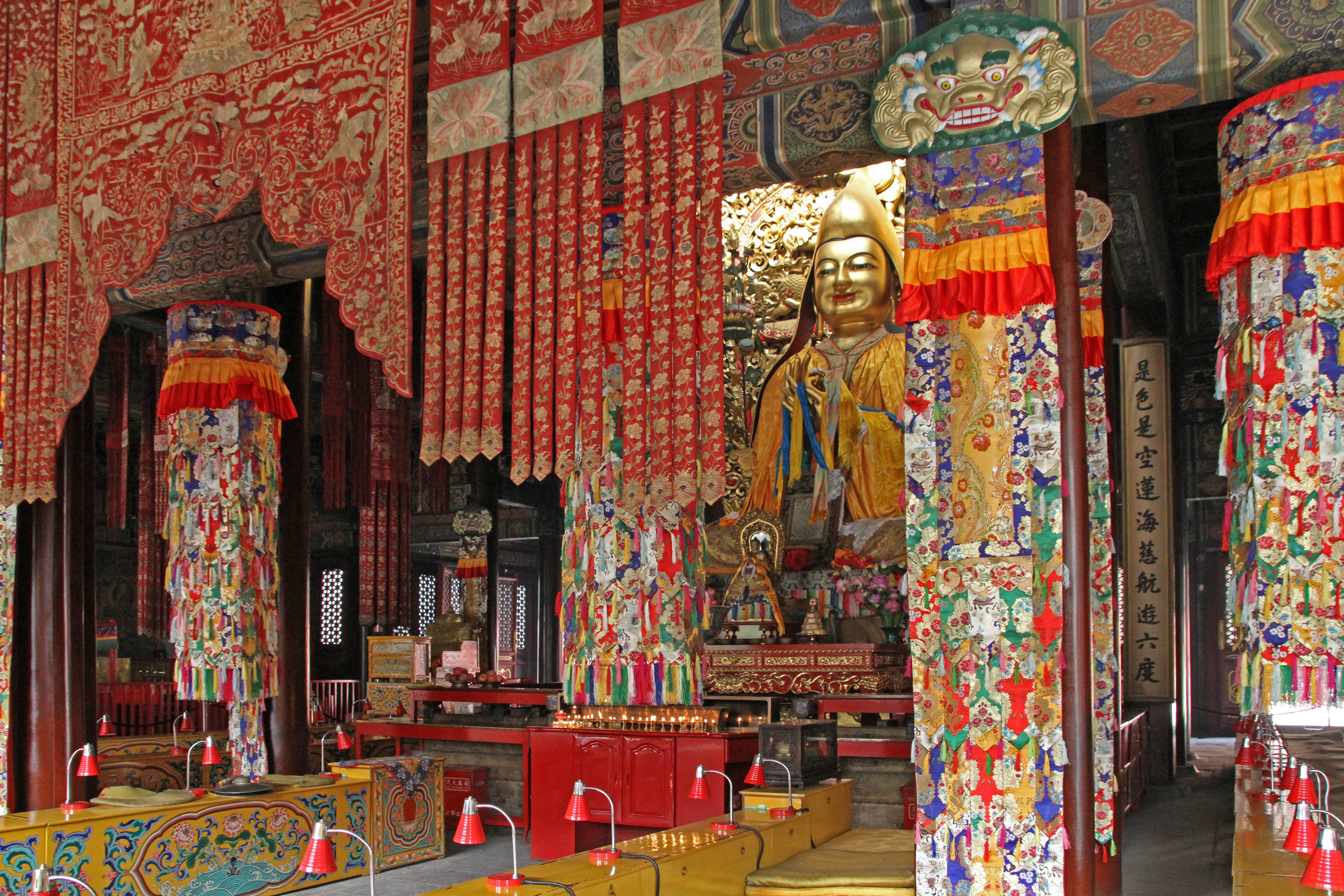
Statue of Tsongkhapa at Yonghe Temple, Beijing

In 1419, Tsongkhapa died at the age of 62 at Ganden Monastery. At the time of his death, he was a well-known figure in Tibet with a large following. Jinpa notes that various sources from other Tibetan Buddhist schools, like Pawo Tsuklak Trengwa and Sakya Chokden write about how large numbers of Tibetans flocked to Tsongkhapa's new Gelug tradition during the 15th century. Tsongkhapa's three principal disciples were Khedrup Gelek Pelzang, 1st Panchen Lama, Gyaltsap Darma Rinchen, and Dülzin Drakpa Gyaltsen. Other important students of Tsongkhapa were "Tokden Jampel Gyatso; Jamyang Chöjé and Jamchen Chöjé, the founders of Drepung and Sera monasteries, respectively; and the 1st Dalai Lama, Gendün Drup."

After Tsongkhapa's death, his disciples worked to spread his teachings and the Gelug school grew rapidly across the Tibetan Plateau, founding new or converting existing numerous monasteries. The new Gelug tradition, as a descendant of the Kadam school, emphasized monastic discipline and rigorous study of the Buddhist classics. According to Jinpa, by the end of the fifteenth century, the "new Ganden tradition had spread through the entire Tibetan Plateau, with monasteries upholding the tradition located in western Tibet, in central Ü-Tsang, and in southern Tibet, and in Kham and Amdo in the east."

After his death, Tsongkhapa's works were also published in woodblock prints, making them much more accessible. Several biographies of Tsongkhapa were also written by ordained scholars of different traditions. Tsongkhapa was also held in high regard by key figures of other Tibetan Buddhist traditions. 8th Karmapa, Mikyö Dorje, in a poem called In Praise of the Incomparable Tsong Khapa, calls Tsongkhapa "the reformer of Buddha’s doctrine", "the great charioteer of Madhyamaka philosophy in Tibet", "supreme among those who propound emptiness", and "one who had helped spread robe-wearing monastics across Tibet and from China to Kashmir". The 9th Karmapa, Wangchuk Dorje praised Tsongkhapa as one "who swept away wrong views with the correct and perfect ones".

Tsongkhapa's works and teachings became central for the Ganden or Gelug school, where he is seen as a highly revered teacher. Their interpretation and exegesis became a major focus of Gelug scholasticism. They were also very influential on later Tibetan philosophers, who would either defend or criticize Tsongkhapa's views on numerous points.

Tsongkhapa's body had been preserved at Ganden Monastery. The entire compound was reduced to rubble by Chinese Red Guards during the Cultural Revolution. After they failed to sink the body into a river, it was eventually burned with kerosene. Only a single tooth survived, and its clay impressions were secretly distributed to those of the Buddhist faith.

Tsongkhapa's Madhyamaka thought has become widely influential in the western scholarly understanding of Madhyamaka, as the majority of books and articles beginning in the 1980s were based on Gelug explanations.

==== Hagiographies ====
After his death, Tsongkhapa came to be seen as a second Buddha in the Gelug tradition. Numerous hagiographies were written by Gelug figures such as Khedrup Je and Tokden Jampel Gyatso. These texts developed the great myths of Tsongkhapa, included stories of his previous births. Over time, an extensive collection of myths and stories about Tsongkhapa accumulated.

According to these myths, Tsongkhapa had been a student of Mañjuśrī for numerous past lives. In a former life, he aspired to spread Vajrayāna and the perfect view of emptiness in front of the Buddha Indraketu. Tsongkhapa then received a prophecy from numerous Buddhas which said that he would become the tathāgata Siṁhasvara (Lion's Roar). Another story recounts that during Śākyamuni's life, Tsongkhapa, in the form of a Brahmin boy, offered the Buddha a crystal rosary and generated bodhicitta. The Buddha prophesied that the boy would one day be the reviver of the Buddha's doctrine. Hagiographies such as Khedrup Je's also depict how Tsongkhapa achieved full Buddhahood after his death. Some hagiographical sources also claim that Tsongkhapa was an emanation of Mañjuśrī as well as a reincarnation of Nāgārjuna, Atiśa and Padmasambhava.

== Philosophy ==
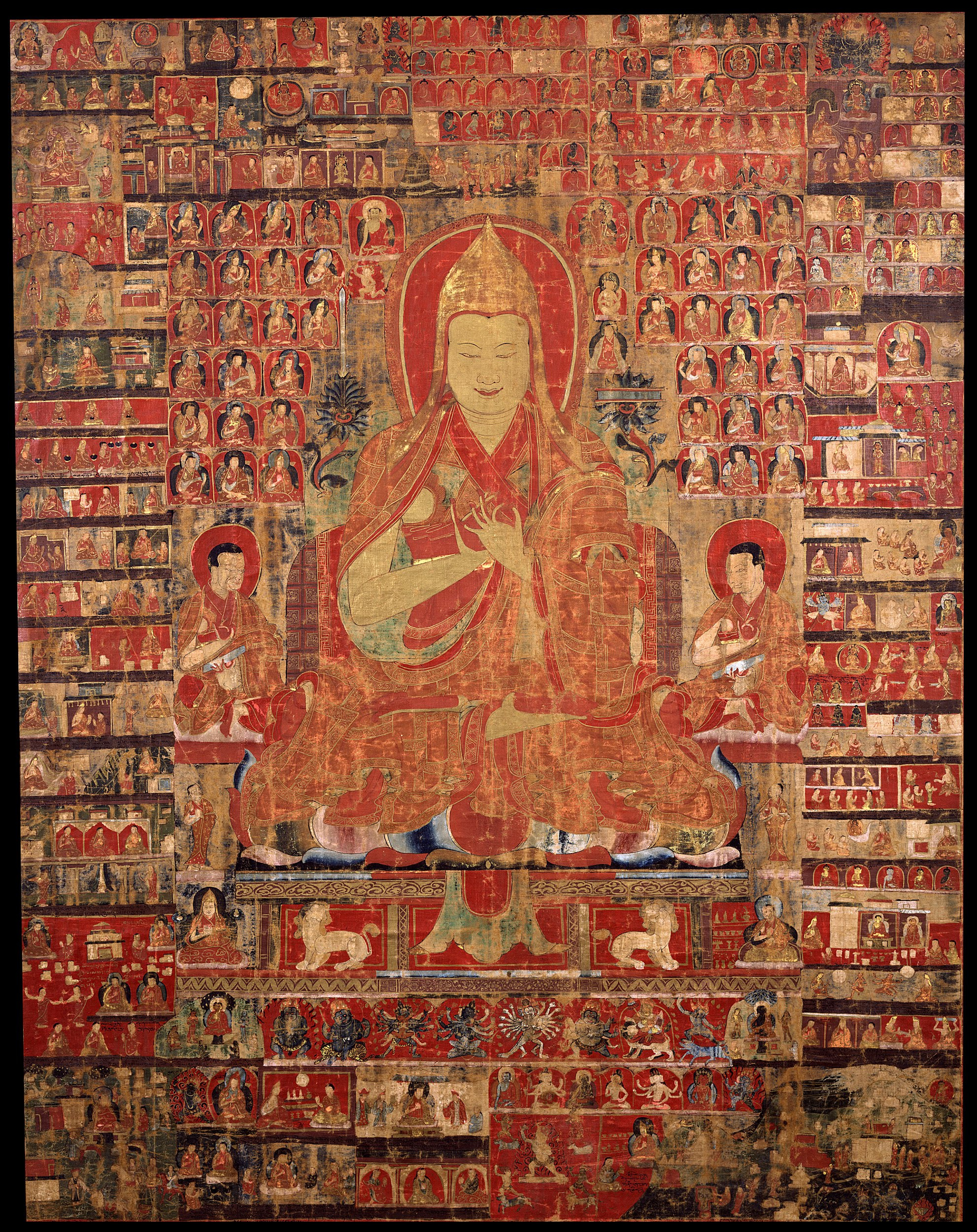
Tsongkapa, 15th-century painting, Rubin Museum of Art

Tsongkhapa's philosophy is mainly based on that of Indian madhyamaka philosophers like Nagarjuna, Buddhapalita and Chandrakirti. Tsongkhapa also draws on the epistemological tradition of Dharmakirti in his explanation of conventional truth. According to Jay Garfield, Tsongkhapa's philosophy is based on the idea that "a complete understanding of Buddhist philosophy requires a synthesis of the epistemology and logic of Dharmakirti with the thought/view of Nagarjuna." According to Thomas Doctor, Tsongkhapa's madhyamaka views were also influenced by the 12th-century Kadam school madhyamaka Mabja Changchub Tsöndrü (d. 1185).

Tsongkhapa is also known for his emphasis on the importance of philosophical reasoning on the path to liberation. According to Tsongkhapa, meditation must be paired with rigorous reasoning in order "to push the mind and precipitate a breakthrough in cognitive fluency and insight."

According to Thupten Jinpa, Tsongkhapa's thought was concerned with three main misinterpretations of madhyamaka philosophy in Tibet:

- a nihilistic or overly skeptical reading of the prasangika-madhyamaka which denigrates or undermines the everyday world of experience and the validity of epistemology (Patsab is one figure who Tsongkhapa sees as associated with this view).
- the so-called "shentong madhyamaka" view of the Jonang school and its founder Dolpopa, which Tsongkhapa sees as absolutist and essentialist.
- a view which held that conceptual analysis and correct views were unnecessary and that what mattered was to get rid of all thought or to get rid of all concepts or to just remain in single pointed concentration (as thoughts arise and pass). Tsongkhapa saw these ideas as being associated with the Chinese Chan figure of Heshang and some Tibetan Buddhists. He held that these quietist views (which reject study and conceptual analysis) were soteriological dead-ends and could have negative ethical consequences.

According to Thupten Jinpa, one of Tsongkhapa's main concerns was "to delineate the parameters of Madhyamaka reasoning in such a way that Madhyamaka dialectics cannot be seen to negate the objects of everyday experience and, more importantly, ethics and religious activity" or as Tsongkhapa put it, one must "correctly identify the object of negation" (which is svabhava). (Note: According to Thupten Jinpa " the following elements appear to be key to his [Tsongkhapa's] strategy in delineating the parameters of negation.": distinguishing between the domains of conventional and ultimate discourses; distinguishing between the two senses of 'ultimate' in the context of Madhyamaka dialectics; identifying the object of negation prior to the application of Madhyamaka dialectics; distinguishing between that which is 'negated' and that which is 'not found'; and; understanding correctly the logical form of the negation involved in these dialectics.) Tsongkhapa held that if one did not properly understand what is to be negated in madhyamaka, one was at risk of either negating too much (nihilism) or negating too little (essentialism), and thus one would "miss the mark" of madhyamaka. According to Jinpa, the correct object of negation for Tsongkhapa is "our innate apprehension of self-existence" which refers to how even our normal ways of perceiving the world "are effected by a belief in some kind of intrinsic existence of things and events". Jinpa also writes that the second major aspect of Tsongkhapa's philosophical project "entails developing a systematic theory of reality in the aftermath of an absolute rejection of intrinsic existence".

=== View of ultimate truth and emptiness ===
Tsongkhapa follows Nagarjuna and Candrakirti in asserting that all phenomena are empty of inherent existence or essence (svabhava) because they are dependently originated. (Note: According to Jay Garfield, "[a] fundamental tenet of any Buddhist school is that all phenomena are dependently originated. In Madhyamaka Buddhist thought, following Candrakrti [...], this dependency is glossed in three ways": 1. Pratītyasamutpāda or 'dependent arising.' All things arise in dependence on causes and conditions, and cease when those causes and conditions are no longer present. (Note: "All things arise in dependence on causes and conditions, and this is the meaning of dependent origination".); 2. All wholes are dependent upon their parts for existence, and all parts are dependent on their wholes for existence. (Note: "Although both from the standpoint of reality and from that of everyday life, The sevenfold reasoning shows that a chariot cannot be established, in everyday life, without analysis it is designated in dependence on its parts."); 3. Prajñaptir upādāya or 'dependent designation.' All phenomena are dependent for their existence on conceptual imputation. (Note: "Although dependent origination is generally maintained to be dependence upon conditions, from our perspective, this is not inconsistent with [them existing in] dependence upon mundane nominal conventions.")) For Tsongkhapa, all phenomena lack inherent existence and come into existence relative to a designating consciousness which co-arises with that phenomenon. (Note: Designation is, according to Kelsang Gyatso's translation of Lorig, (Note: The Gelug text on mind and mental factors.) the application of a conceptual image or term to a selected object of mere experience. (Note: The 14th Dalai Lama: "When the issue of how do ultimately unfindable things actually exist becomes unbearable and we have to say something, the bottom line is that their existence is established by virtue simply of names. In other words, the existence of these things is established and proven by virtue simply of the fact that they can be named within the context of mental labeling. There is no additional need for an inherent, findable, defining characteristic on the side of the basis for labeling rendering things existent and giving them their identity. Thus the existence of ultimately unfindable things is merely conventional.") (Note: Tsongkhapa quoting Nagarjuna: "All things are empty by nature. Therefore, the unexcelled Tathagata taught the dependent origination of phenomena. That is the supreme meaning. The Buddha, relying on worldly conventions, states that all the various phenomena are in reality designated." Tsongkhapa goes on to say: "The ultimate mode of the existence of things is nothing but their absence of essence - that is, their being dependently originated. Hence, it is explained that all such things as arising are established as imputed through the power of convention [...] [T]he meaning of 'conventional existence' [had it not been spelled out in this way] would not be understood to be established as existent merely through the force of nominal convention. (emphasis original)))

Tsongkhapa saw emptiness (shūnyatā) of intrinsic nature as a consequence of pratītyasamutpāda (dependent arising), the teaching that no dharma ("thing", "phenomena") has an existence of its own, but always comes into existence in dependence on other dharmas. According to Tsongkhapa, dependent-arising and emptiness are inseparable. (Note: They exist in a relationship of entity or identity. A relationship of entity or identity is one in which two objects are merely conceptually distinct, but not actually distinct. For example, the relationship between the mental categorization of a dog and that of an animal, with regards to the same being. If it is a dog, then it must also be an animal. Additionally, this relationship applies to impermanent phenomena and products: if it's impermanent, it must be a product.) (Note: The Heart Sutrastates this as follows: "Form is empty. Emptiness is form. Emptiness is not other than form; form is also not other than emptiness. In the same way, feeling, discrimination, compositional factors, and consciousness are empty. Shariputra, likewise, all phenomena are emptiness; without characteristic; unproduced, unceased; stainless, not without stain; not deficient, not fulfilled.") Tsongkhapa's view on "ultimate reality" is condensed in the short text In Praise of Dependent Arising, which states that phenomena do exist conventionally, but that, ultimately, everything is dependently arisen, and therefore void of inherent existence or intrinsic nature (svabhava), which is "the object of negation" or that which is to be disproved by madhyamaka reasoning. Tsongkhapa writes that "since objects do not exist through their own nature, they are established as existing through the force of convention."

Furthermore, according to Tsongkhapa, emptiness is itself empty of inherent existence and thus only exists nominally and conventionally as dependent arising. There is thus no "transcendental ground," and "ultimate reality" that has an existence of its own. Instead, emptiness is the negation of such a transcendental independent reality and an affirmation that all things exist interdependently (even emptiness itself). Emptiness is the ultimate truth (which applies to all possible phenomena, in all possible worlds), but it is not an ultimate phenomenon, thing or a primordial substance (which has always existed, is self-created, and is self-sustaining etc.) like Brahman. As such, the ultimate truth of emptiness for Tsongkhapa is a negational truth, a non-affirming negation. This ultimate reality is the mere absence of intrinsic nature in all things. (Note: Pabongka Rinpoche states in Liberation in Our Hands that if we can not correctly "recognize the nature of the false mode of existence that is being denied, we will not be able to realize the simple negation [Skr. prasajyapratisedhah or non-affirming negation] that is established through its refutation.")

A non-affirming or non-implicative (prasajya) negation is a negation which does not leave something in the place of what has been negated. For instance, when one says that a Buddhist should not drink alcohol, they are not affirming that a Buddhist should, in fact, drink something else. (Note: "[A non-affirming negation is defined as] a negative object in which no further entity is implied when the mind negates the object that is related to it.") (Note: Another example can be found in the debate over the use of the terms "devoid of nature itself" in Gelug Mahamudra (non-affirming negation) and "that which has voidness as its nature" in non-Gelug Mahamudra and Dzogchen (an affirming negation).) According to Tsongkhapa, in negating inherent nature, a madhyamika is not affirming any thing or quality in its place (such as some ultimate void, absolute, or ground of being).

In his works, Tsongkhapa takes pains to refute an alternative interpretation of emptiness which was promoted by the Tibetan philosopher Dolpopa Sherab Gyaltsen (1292–1361). This view (called shentong, "empty of other") held that ultimate reality is not a non-affirming negation, and that it is only empty of conventional things and is not empty of itself. This view thus holds that ultimate reality has a kind of true existence as the ultimate and absolute ground of reality. According to Tsongkhapa, this view is absurd and is not found in the Buddhist scriptures.

=== The existence of the conventional ===
Tsongkhapa's prāsaṅgika madhyamaka affirms the "mere existence" of dependent phenomena on the conventional level. As such, Tsongkhapa argues that conventional truths are true because there is a sense in which they exist (Tib. yod pa) in some real sense. For Tsongkhapa, this conventional existence means that phenomena (i.e. dharmas) only come into existence in a dependent and contingent way, which includes the fact that they arise co-dependently with the minds that perceive them and conceptually impute their existence. In this view, things do exist in a conventional and nominal sense as conceptual imputations (rtog pas btags tsam) which are dependent upon a relationship with a knowing and designating mind. However, all phenomena still lack existence in an independent, self-arising, or self-sustaining manner. That is to say, when one searches for the ultimate nature of any thing, "what the thing really is", nothing can be found under this "ultimate analysis" and thus nothing can withstand ultimate analysis. Unlike other Tibetan madhyamikas, Tsongkhapa argues that this does not mean things do not exist at all or that ultimate analysis undermines conventional existence. Thus for Tsongkhapa, the conventional really is a kind of truth, a way of being real.

Tsongkhapa cites numerous passages from Nagarjuna which show that emptiness (the lack of intrinsic nature) and dependent origination (the fact that all dharmas arise based on causes and conditions) ultimately have the same intent and meaning and thus they are two ways of discussing one single reality. Tsongkhapa also cites various passages from Chandrakirti to show that even though phenomena do not arise intrinsically, they do arise conventionally. Chandrakirti is quoted by Tsongkhapa as stating "even though all things are empty, from those empty things effects are definitely produced", "because things are not produced causelessly, or from causes such as a divine creator, or from themselves, or from both self and other, they are produced dependently", and "we contend that dependently produced things are, like reflections, not produced intrinsically."

He also cites a passage from Chandrakirti's commentary to Aryadeva's Four Hundred which states:

"Our analysis focuses only on those who search for the intrinsically real referent. What we are refuting here is that things [and events] are established by means of their own-being. We do not [however] negate [the existence of] eyes and so on, which are [causally] conditioned and are dependently originated in that they are the fruits of karma."

In this way, Tsongkhapa argues that the madhyamaka idea that dharmas do not arise or are not found is to be qualified as meaning that they do not arise intrinsically or essentially. He also cites the Laṅkāvatāra Sūtra where the Buddha says, "Mahamati, thinking that they are not produced intrinsically, I said that all phenomena are not produced".

Because of this, Tsongkhapa holds that while conventional phenomena cannot withstand ultimate analysis (which searches for the true or ultimate nature of anything and is unable to find anything intrinsically), this does not mean that conventional phenomena are invalidated, undermined or negated by this ultimate analysis, since they still exist as dependent arisings. Indeed, for Tsongkhapa, it is because things are ultimately empty that they can be said to arise and exist at all. Some Tibetan madhyamikas hold that conventional truths are merely the relative conventions of simple everyday people, but that these conventions do not exist for advanced meditators or madhyamika philosophers. Tsongkhapa rejects this as "a great philosophical error" and affirms the pragmatic importance of conventional truths. For Tsongkhapa, the rejection of the dependent reality of the conventional undermines the very possibility of truth and falsehood, and of any epistemic authority and thus, it undermines all Buddhist teachings regarding bondage and liberation as well as undermining itself as a cogent argument. However, like Candrakīrti, Tsonkghapa also accepts that while conventional truths are truths, they also can obscure or veil the ultimate (since for most people, these truths appear as intrinsically true). This is like how a mirage is a real phenomenon, but can also be deceptive (since it appears to be what it is not)

Tsongkhapa also argues that ultimate analysis is not merely a philosophical or intellectual matter, instead it is supposed to negate a deep internal habit that sentient beings have which experiences the world in a false and distorted way. This superimposition is a "pervasive sense that things are real and solid and exist just as they appear" which we have become habituated and addicted to for countless lifetimes. This addiction is what is to be refuted and abandoned. It is not the idea of "intrinsic existence" as a philosophical concept (equivalent to a non-existent rabbit's horn and thus trivial). Another way of saying this is that for Tsongkhapa, the most subtle object of negation is the perception that phenomena have "their own way of existing without being posited through the force of consciousness". It is an ongoing mental process of imputing objectively independent reality and intrinsic existence to what is perceived.

Tsongkhapa's view that a dependent and conventional reality is not negated by madhyamaka (and that it is just intrinsic nature that is negated) was a subject of much debate among Tibetan madhyamaka philosophers and became a subject of critique for Sakya school figures like Gorampa Sonam Senge (1429-1489). Sakya philosophers like Gorampa and his supporters held that madhyamaka analysis rejects all conventional phenomena (which he calls "false appearances" and sees as conceptually produced) and so, tables and persons are no more real than dreams or Santa Claus. Thus, for Gorampa (contra Tsongkhapa), conventional truth is "entirely false", "unreal", "a kind of nonexistence" and "truth only from the perspective of fools." But for Tsongkhapa, the two truths (conventional and ultimate) are two facts about the same reality, or "two aspects of one and the same world" according to Thupten Jinpa. Thus for Tsongkhapa, to totally negate conventional truth (at the level of ultimate truth) would be to negate dependent origination (and so, it is to negate emptiness, the ultimate truth itself). Tsongkhapa sees this as a kind of nihilism.

=== Epistemology ===
Tsongkhapa held that a proper defense of madhyamaka required an understanding of pramāṇa (epistemology) on the conventional level and that furthermore, one could make epistemic distinctions about the conventional and know what is conventionally true and what is a falsehood. For example, one can know that a rope on the ground is not a snake (even if one has initially been fooled by it). For Tsongkhapa, it was not enough to just argue for the emptiness of all phenomena (the ultimate truth), madhyamaka also needed proper epistemic instruments or sources of knowledge (Tib. tshad ma, Skt. pramāṇa) to defend Buddhist views about conventional truths (such as Buddhist ethics) and to have a coherent sense of why something is true or false. As Jay Garfield notes, for Tsongkhapa "without an antecedent account of these instruments and their authority, there is no way to distinguish conventional truth from conventional falsity." Furthermore, Thupten Jinpa writes that Tsongkhapa "does not agree with those who claim that the use of the tetralemma in Madhyamaka implies a denial of fundamental logical principles such as the law of the excluded middle and the principle of contradiction".

In order to explain how conventional reality is perceived in a valid way, Tsongkhapa draw on Buddhist pramāṇa philosophy in order to develop his own Buddhist epistemological theory. From Tsongkhapa's perspective, in order for something to exist (conventionally, since nothing exists ultimately), it must be validly designated by a non-impaired functioning consciousness. To talk about an object that does not exist in relation to a subject is incoherent. (Note: "Thus, [Chandrakirti] says that those are synonyms. 'Without depending on another' does not mean not depending on causes and conditions. Instead, 'other' refers to a subject, i.e., a conventional consciousness, and something is said not to depend on another due to not being posited through the force of that conventional consciousness.") (Note: A parallel in western thought can be found in the viewpoint of intentionality: " Every mental phenomenon is characterized by what the Scholastics of the Middle Ages called the intentional (or mental) inexistence of an object, and what we might call, though not wholly unambiguously, reference to a content, direction towards an object (which is not to be understood here as meaning a thing), or immanent objectivity. Every mental phenomenon includes something as object within itself, although they do not all do so in the same way. In presentation something is presented, in judgment, something is affirmed or denied, in love loved, in hate hated, in desire desired and so on. This intentional in-existence is characteristic exclusively of mental phenomena. No physical phenomenon exhibits anything like it. We could, therefore, define mental phenomena by saying that they are those phenomena which contain an object intentionally within themselves. — Franz Brentano, Psychology from an Empirical Standpoint, edited by Linda L. McAlister (London: Routledge, 1995), pp. 88–89.) According to Tsongkhapa, something is validly designated (i.e. it exists conventionally and dependently) if it meets all of the following three conditions:

1. The thing known (prameya) is known to a conventional unimpaired consciousness (whether this consciousness is analytical or not);
2. No other conventional cognition contradicts that which is known from being known in that way;
3. Reason that accurately analyzes whether something intrinsically exists does not contradict that which is known.

Whatever fails to meet those criteria does not exist at all (like a flat earth), and relationships between objects cannot exist without being validly designated into existence. (Note: In Ocean of Reasoning, Tsongkhapa and Nagarjuna spell out various analysis to the effect that phenomena cannot possibly exist without mental imputation. The list includes: "causes" including Conditions, Motion, the Senses, the Aggregates, the Elements, Desire & the Desirous One, "Arising, Enduring, & Ceasing," Agent & Action, Prior Entity, Fire & Fuel, Beginning & End, Suffering, Compounded Phenomena, Contact, Essence, Bondage, Action, Self & Phenomena, Time, Assemblage, Becoming & Destruction, the Buddha, Errors, the Four Noble Truths, Nirvana, the Twelve Links of Dependent Origination, and Views.) (Note: According to Lama Tsongkhapa's interpretation of Nagarjuna, both causes and effects are also merely designated by mind. It is mind that determines that a cause has ceased and its effect is now in existence. (Note: To exemplify this, Lama Tsongkhapa quotes Buddhapalita's response to an Abhidharmica's objection: "It is utterly impossible for time, [causes, effects, and collections of causes and conditions] and such to exist essentially, as you imagine. However, they are established as dependent designation." According to Lama Tsongkhapa, referring to Buddhapalita, this was one of the points of Nagarjuna's Chatuṣkoṭi. Tsongkhapa: "Buddhapalita says, "Nor do things arise from others, because then anything could arise from anything." [Tsongkhapa continues] Here, the reason why the absurd consequence of "if there was arising from another, anything could arise from anything" is presented is that the "other" in "arising from other" is not just something that is different in virtue of being the referent of a different noun, but something that is inherently existent as different. If it existed in that way, then the sprout's depending on the seed would be inconsistent; thus, their relation would be refuted. If [the sprout] were to arise from another unrelated object, then it would arise from anything!) It is also mind which determines that some collection of parts is now considered to be a whole. (Note: Chandrakirti, in the Seven-Point Analysis of a Chariot: "A chariot is neither asserted to be other than its parts, nor to be non-other. It does not possess them. It does not depend on the parts and the parts do not depend on it. It is neither the mere collection of the parts, nor is it their shape. It is like this." ... a chariot is a mere imputation since it does not exist in these seven ways.") Even mind itself is empty of inherently existing in the Prasangika. (Note: In The Gelug/Kagyu Tradition of Mahamudra, the Dalai Lama states that if we scrutinize "the abiding, deepest nature of mind itself as mere clarity and awareness, (Note: In Kelsang Gyatso's Lorig translation: "The definition of mind is that which is clarity and cognizes. This definition, 'clarity' refers to the nature of mind, and 'cognizes to the function of mind.") we see that its existence is established by virtue simply of the fact that is can be mentally labeled." This mental label "mind" is applied to "a continuity of former and later moments of cognition.") The relationship between object and subject is also empty of inherent existence. In Prasangika, all things of samsara and nirvana are merely designated. (Note: From the 1st Panchen Lama's Lozang Chokyi Gyeltsen, one of Tsongkhapa's five main disciples, The Main Road of the Triumphant Ones: "Before the face of proper, total absorption on the actual nature of reality, there is just the severance of fantasized, impossible extremes - namely, inherent, findable existence or total non-existence - with respect to everything of samsara and nirvana. Yet, after you arise, when you inspect, you see that your mind still gives rise to the appearance of things that dependently arise, which do function and can only exist as simply what can be labeled by names. It is unmistakable that such things still naturally dawn, yet they are like dreams, mirages, reflections of the moon in water, and illusions."))

Thus, according to Tsongkhapa, when Candrakīrti states that “the world is not valid in any way”, he is referring to how ordinary worldly consciousnesses are not valid sources of knowledge with regard to ultimate reality. However, Tsongkhapa argues that Candrakīrti does accept pramāṇas conventionally, since he also states "the world knows objects with four valid cognitions." As such, while Tsongkhapa reads Candrakīrti as not accepting that conventional sources of knowledge know the intrinsic nature of things (since there are none), he also argues that Candrakīrti affirms that pramāṇas can give us knowledge about conventional reality (even while our sense faculties are also deceptive, in that they also superimpose intrinsic nature).

For Tsongkhapa, there are two valid ways of understanding the world, two levels of explanation: one way which understands conventional phenomena (which are real but also deceptive, like a magic trick) and another way which sees the profound ultimate truth of things, which is the sheer fact that they lack intrinsic nature. As Newland explains, each one of these epistemic points of view provides a different lens or perspective on reality, which Tsongkhapa illustrates by discussing how "we do not see sounds no matter how carefully we look." In the same way, while conventional truths are not found by an ultimate analysis that searches for their intrinsic nature, they are still functional conventionally and this is not discredited by the ultimate truth of emptiness. Tsongkhapa thinks that if we only relied on the ultimate epistemological point of view, we would not be able to distinguish between virtue from non-virtue, or enlightenment from samsara (since ultimate analysis only tells us that they are equally empty). Instead, Tsongkhapa holds that the emptiness must complement, rather than undermine, conventional Buddhist truths.

This is a different interpretation of Candrakīrti's epistemic theory than that adopted by Tibetan figures like Gorampa and Taktsang Lotsawa, who argue that Candrakīrti's prāsaṅgika mādhyamika rejects all epistemic sources of knowledge since all conventional cognitions are flawed.

=== The prāsaṅgika–svātantrika distinction ===
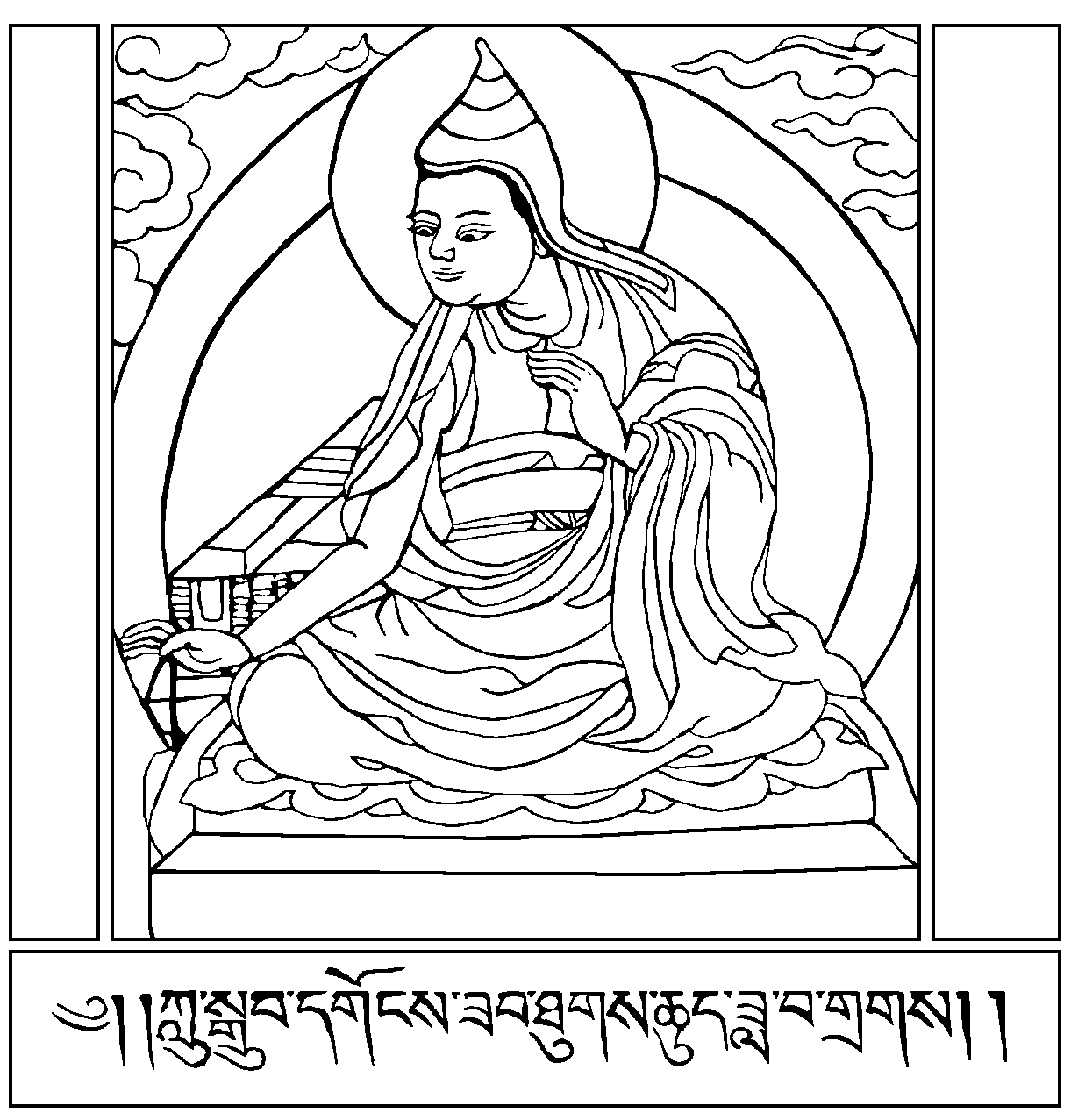
The Indian philosopher Candrakīrti, whom Tsongkhapa takes as his major authority on Nagarjuna's madhyamaka

Like his teacher Rendawa, Tsongkhapa was a proponent of Candrakīrti's interpretation of the madhyamaka philosophy (which he termed prāsaṅgika, "consequentialist"). According to Tsongkhapa, the prāsaṅgika-approach (which is based mainly on using reductio ad absurdum arguments) is the superior approach to madhyamaka. This is a position which, according to José Cabezón, may be traced back to 11th century figures like the Kashmiri scholar Jayananda and the Tibetan Patsab.

Tsongkhapa held that the alternative svātantrika approach to madhyamaka (defended by figures like Śāntarakṣita or Bhāviveka) was inferior. Tsongkhapa argued that the svātantrika approach holds that one had to posit autonomous syllogisms (svatantrānumāna) in order to defend madhyamaka and that this insistence implies that phenomena (dharmas) or at least logic itself, has intrinsic nature (svabhava) conventionally. Bhāviveka (the main target of Tsongkhapa's critique) does not actually affirm the existence of intrinsic natures conventionally or that conventional reality is "established with its own identity," in any of his texts, and Tsongkhapa's interpretation of the implications of Bhāviveka's thought is a topic of much debate among Tibetan and modern western authors on madhyamaka.

Regarding autonomous syllogistic arguments, Tsongkhapa (like Candrakirti) argues that they are not always necessary and that prāsaṅga arguments (i.e. reductios) are often enough to prove the madhyamaka view of emptiness by "demonstrating the unwelcome consequences (in any given position that presupposes intrinsic existence)." Tsongkhapa does not reject that madhyamikas can make use of autonomous syllogisms, but he disagrees with Bhāviveka's insistence that they must use them. According to Jinpa, Tsongkhapa here is critiquing what contemporary philosophy would call "the autonomy of reason", "that is, that reason, or logic, possesses its own ontological status as an independent, ultimate reality".

For Tsongkhapa, these key differences reveal that the understanding of emptiness of the svātantrika philosophers is inferior to the prāsaṅgikas, since the svātantrika insistence on the use of autonomous syllogisms implies that they accept intrinsic nature conventionally (and since they think their syllogisms are established on this basis, they hold that their conclusions are certain). Tsongkhapa strongly rejects that either phenomenon or reasoning have intrinsic natures or characteristics in any way. Instead, Tsongkhapa holds that all phenomena are dependent and "simply labeled by thought construction" (Tib. rtog pas btags tsam) and thus they are empty of intrinsic nature even conventionally. While Tsongkhapa holds that the insistence on the use of syllogisms (and the idea that they provide certainty) reveals a shortcoming in the thought of svātantrika, nevertheless, he thinks that prāsaṅgikas may make use of syllogistic arguments, as long as they do not rely on (conventional) intrinsic characteristics when making use of these syllogisms. (Note: For example, if cause-effect relationships occur because the sprout itself produces the effect of being a sprout (self-arising), then this "would mean that something that already exists is being produced, [and] production would be purposeless and endless [... if] contradictions are assembled in this way, the only result is that the opponents understand them and abandon" wrong tenets. To clarify with a more modern rendition: if 500 people were shown 100,000 slides of a seed turning into a small plant, would we expect them all to agree that on slide number 1,008 the seed causes the sprout? If one argues that the seed objectively and independently causes the sprout (other-arising) or that the sprout causes itself (self-arising) at the material level, then everyone would be forced to agree that this event occurs at a particular time. However, because the sprout arises relative to a conscious observer who designates the term-concept "sprout" onto the continuum of slides, we find that almost no one can agree where the seed ceases and the sprout arises. This is because the cause-effect relationship cannot be found at the objective material level. The cause-effect relationship is also dependently designated, a viewpoint which is established by Lama Tsongkhapa, Nagarjuna, and Buddapalita.)

=== Prāsaṅgikas have a thesis ===
Tsongkhapa also argues that prāsaṅgikas do not just reject all theses or views. Instead, Tsongkhapa holds that while prāsaṅgikas focus on refuting those views which presuppose or posit intrinsic natures (svabhava), they do have a thesis (Skt. darśana, Tib. lta ba) of their own. This is the view that all phenomena lack intrinsic nature (niḥsvabhāvavāda), which is not a dogmatic or false view (dṛṣṭi) to be rejected, but is the rare and correct understanding of emptiness (śūnyatā-darśana) and dependent origination which allows us to be liberated. Tsongkhapa thus affirms that prāsaṅgikas may use syllogisms, make positive assertions, hold positions (which they consider to be true) and argue for them. Tsongkhapa also distinguishes between two closely related (and overlapping) but also distinct senses of the term "ultimate" (Skt. paramārtha): (1) a "substantially real mode of being" (i.e. intrinsic nature) and (2) the ultimate truth or fact about the world (as opposed to the conventional truths), which is emptiness. It is due to this distinction that Tsongkhapa is able to state that even though nothing is ultimate in the first sense, madhyamakas do hold a thesis, mainly that emptiness (in the second sense) is a true fact about reality.

While some Tibetan thinkers argued that Nagarjuna's refutation of existence, non-existence, both or neither (called the catuṣkoṭi, "four corners") meant that he rejected all philosophical views (and all existence) completely, Tsongkhapa disagrees with this interpretation. Instead, Tsongkhapa understands Nagarjuna's negation of the catuṣkoṭi to refer to the lack of intrinsic existence, intrinsic non-existence etc. Thus, as Guy Newland explains, Tsongkhapa interprets the negation of the catuṣkoṭi to mean that "we refute the reifying view that things exist ultimately; we refute the nihilistic view that things do not exist even conventionally; we refute that there is any single sense in which things both exist and do not exist; we refute that there is any single sense in which things neither exist nor do not exist." As Thupten Jinpa notes, this interpretation of the negative catuṣkoṭi is based on Tsongkhapa's view that the Sanskrit term bhāva (existence) has a dual meaning in madhyamaka: one refers to a reified sense of intrinsic existence (which is to be negated) and a conventionally existent actuality, functional thing or event (which is not negated). Jinpa notes that Tsongkhapa interprets the madhyamaka argument called 'diamond splinters' (rdo rje gzegs ma), which refutes the intrinsic arising of dharmas, in a similar manner.

This is also why Tsongkhapa holds that reasoning about means of knowledge or epistemological tools (Skt. pramāṇa) is central to the madhyamaka project, since he thinks that prāsaṅgika-madhyamikas make use of reasoning in order to establish their view of the lack of intrinsic nature conventionally. However, this reasoning derives its efficacy through dependent origination, not through some intrinsic nature or power (whether conventional or otherwise).

=== Eight difficult points of Tsongkhapa's madhyamaka ===
The unique aspects of Tsongkhapa's prāsaṅgika madhyamaka philosophy are also often outlined through the "eight difficult points" (dka' gnad brgyad), which were set by Tsongkhapa in a series of lecture notes which were later edited by his disciple Gyaltsap Je.

According to Tsongkhapa and Gyaltsap, three of these main ideas relate to ontology and are:

- prāsaṅgika rejects intrinsic characteristics (sva-lakṣaṇa) or intrinsic nature (svabhāva), ultimately and conventionally.
- the rejection the storehouse consciousness (ālāyavijñāna), ultimately and conventionally.
- the conventional acceptance of external objects (outside the mind), contra Yogacara idealism.

Four other key points of Tsongkhapa's madhyamaka concern the path to enlightenment and are:

- the nonacceptance of autonomous syllogisms or independent proofs (rang rgyud, svatantra) as being a means for developing arguments or establishing the truth. Instead, Tsongkhapa's madhyamaka uses a "presupposition or reason which is well known by opponents" (gzhan grags, paraprasiddha) in order to illustrate the errors in the views of one's opponents.
- the rejection of self-awareness (Sk. sva-saṃvitti, sva-saṃvedana), even conventionally. Tsongkhapa thinks that to posit a consciousness that can operate on itself introduces a kind of essentialism. Like Shantideva, he also argues that this idea is logically incoherent. Following Shantideva, Tsongkhapa cites the Lankavatara which says "just as the blade of a sword cannot cut itself, and just as a fingernail cannot touch itself, so too is it true of one's mind."
- the way in which the two obscurations exist.
- the acceptance that the disciples and solitary Buddhas realize the emptiness of phenomena. This means that for Tsongkhapa, hīnayāna arhats also realize the same emptiness that Mahayanists realize, since both the emptiness of persons and the emptiness of phenomena are intertwined and one logically entails the other.

One final point concerns the result or fruit (of the path) i.e. Buddhahood. For Tsongkhapa, fully awakened Buddhas do perceive all of conventional reality in their fullest extent (even impure things).

Regarding the storehouse consciousness (ālāyavijñāna), Tsongkhapa holds that this theory is rejected by the ultimate view of prāsaṅgika madhyamaka. However, he agrees that this teaching may be of provisional use for some individuals (since it was taught by the Buddha in some sutras) who hold to a lower view, are not able to fully understand emptiness and have a "fear of annihilation". Tsongkhapa relies on Chandrakirti's refutation of the storehouse consciousness, particularly in Madhyamakāvatāra VI, 39.

Tsongkhapa also presents an alternative view of explaining personal identity, rebirth and karma. These are explained through a "mere I" (nga tsam) that is dependently designated on the basis of the five aggregates. (Note: According to the Gelugpa, the Chittamatra hold that the mind-basis-of-all consciousness is that which bears the karmic seeds and is findable upon analysis. That is, "if one sought the basis of the designation of the person one would discover the mind-basis-of-all." The Madhyamika-Prasangika posit that beings accumulate karma and experience their effects without the mind-basis-of-all? They posit that karma is carried on the mere "I" which is dependently designated on the basis of the aggregates, stating that "it is a sufficient basis with which to associate the factors of disintegratedness (karma)." Daniel Cozant expands by saying that since phenomena are neither inherently created nor inherently destroyed according to Prasangika, that "therefore, the possibility of a later effect is not precluded.") Tsongkhapa states that "we should maintain that the object of our innate I-consciousness is the mere person – i.e., the mere I - which is the focus of our natural sense of self". This conventional and dependent sense of self or I-consciousness is a pre-linguistic and pre-conceptual instinctive process. When rebirth occurs, an individual's mental continuum (rgyun) moves from one life to another, just like a river or stream moves along. The continuum's "mere I" carries the past life karmic imprints to the next life and there is thus no need to posit a separate kind of "storehouse" consciousness for karmic imprints.

Tsongkhapa also rejects Buddhist idealism (which was associated with the Yogācāra school and various Tibetan madhyamaka authors) and thus affirms the conventional existence of an external world (like Bhaviveka). As Newland writes, Tsongkhapa's madhyamaka "does assert that there is a fully functioning external world, a world that exists outside of our minds. However, in the same breath it emphasizes that this external world is utterly dependent upon consciousness." In his rejection of Yogācāra idealism, Tsongkhapa follows Chandrakirti's refutation of Yogacara in the Madhyamakāvatāra.

=== Hermeneutics ===
Tsongkhapa also wrote on Buddhist hermeneutics, which is a major subject of his Essence of Eloquence. Tsongkhapa held that it was important to have a proper understanding of hermeneutics in order to properly interpret the many seemingly contradictory statements found in the Buddhist sutras and scholastic treatises. According to Tsongkhapa, the main criteria for interpreting the various statements attributed to the Buddha is human reason (Sk. yukti, Tib. rigs pa), particularly the kind of reasoning which analyzes phenomena to find their ultimate nature (which is emptiness, the lack of intrinsic nature itself). Furthermore, Tsongkhapa relies on the Teachings of Akshayamati Sutra (Skt. Akṣayamatinirdeśa; Wyl. blo gros mi zad pas bstan pa) which states that the sutras of definitive meaning are those sutras which teach emptiness (such as the Prajñāpāramitā sutras).

Because of this, for Tsongkhapa, all statements and passages in the various sutras or treatises which do not express this lack of intrinsic nature are not definitive or ultimate statements (Skt. nitartha) and are thus statements which "require further interpretation" or "need to be fully drawn out" (neyartha). This includes all texts belonging to the Śrāvaka schools, all Yogācāra works as well as non-prāsaṅgika madhyamaka philosophy (like Bhāviveka and Śāntarakṣita). This also includes all sutras and statements regarding the important concept of tathāgatagarbha (i.e. Buddha-nature) or the luminous mind, which for Tsongkhapa, are just an expedient way of describing the emptiness of the mind and its defilements, as well as the potential for Buddhahood which all beings have. In this he follows Indian madhyamikas like Bhaviveka and Candrakirti as well as Kadam scholars such as Ngog Loden Sherab and Chaba Chokyi Senge.

For Tsongkhapa, only the madhyamaka view of Nagarjuna (as understood by prāsaṅgikas like Aryadeva, Buddhapalita, Candrakīrti and Shantideva) is a definitive interpretation of the final intent of the Buddha. However, because of the Buddha's bodhicitta, he explains the teaching in a wide variety of (neyartha) ways, all of which are ultimately based in and lead to the final insight into emptiness.

=== Critiques against Tsongkhapa ===
According to Thupten Jinpa, the main critics of Tsongkhapa's thought were Sakya scholars. The first Sakya scholar to openly critique Tsongkhapa was Rongton Shakya Gyaltsen (1367-1449) and his critiques were met by responses written by Khedrup Je. The philosophical critique of Tsongkhapa was later continued by a trio of Sakya school thinkers: Taktsang Lotsawa, Gorampa, and Shākya Chokden, all followers of Rongton.

According to Jinpa, Taktsang's critique focuses on "Tsongkhapa's insistence on the need to maintain a robust notion of conventional truth grounded in some verifiable criteria of validity". For Taktsang, epistemology is faulty and thus Tsongkhapa's attempt at a synthesis of madhyamaka and pramana leads to serious problems. Gorampa meanwhile argued that Tsongkhapa's definition of emptiness as an absolute negation of intrinsic existence was a form of nihilism. He also took issue with Tsongkhapa's characterization of conventional truth as a kind of existence.

Later Kagyu figures also penned critiques of some of Tsongkhapa's views, such as Mikyö Dorje. Gelug scholars like Lekpa Chöjor (a.k.a. Jamyang Galo, 1429–1503), the first Panchen Lama, Lozang Chökyi Gyaltsen (1507–1662), Jetsun Chökyi Gyaltsen (1469–1544/46), Sera Jetsun Chökyi Gyaltsen, Panchen Delek Nyima and Jamyang Zhepa (1648–1751) penned various responses to these various critiques in defense of Tsongkhapa's views.

== Teachings on Buddhist practice ==
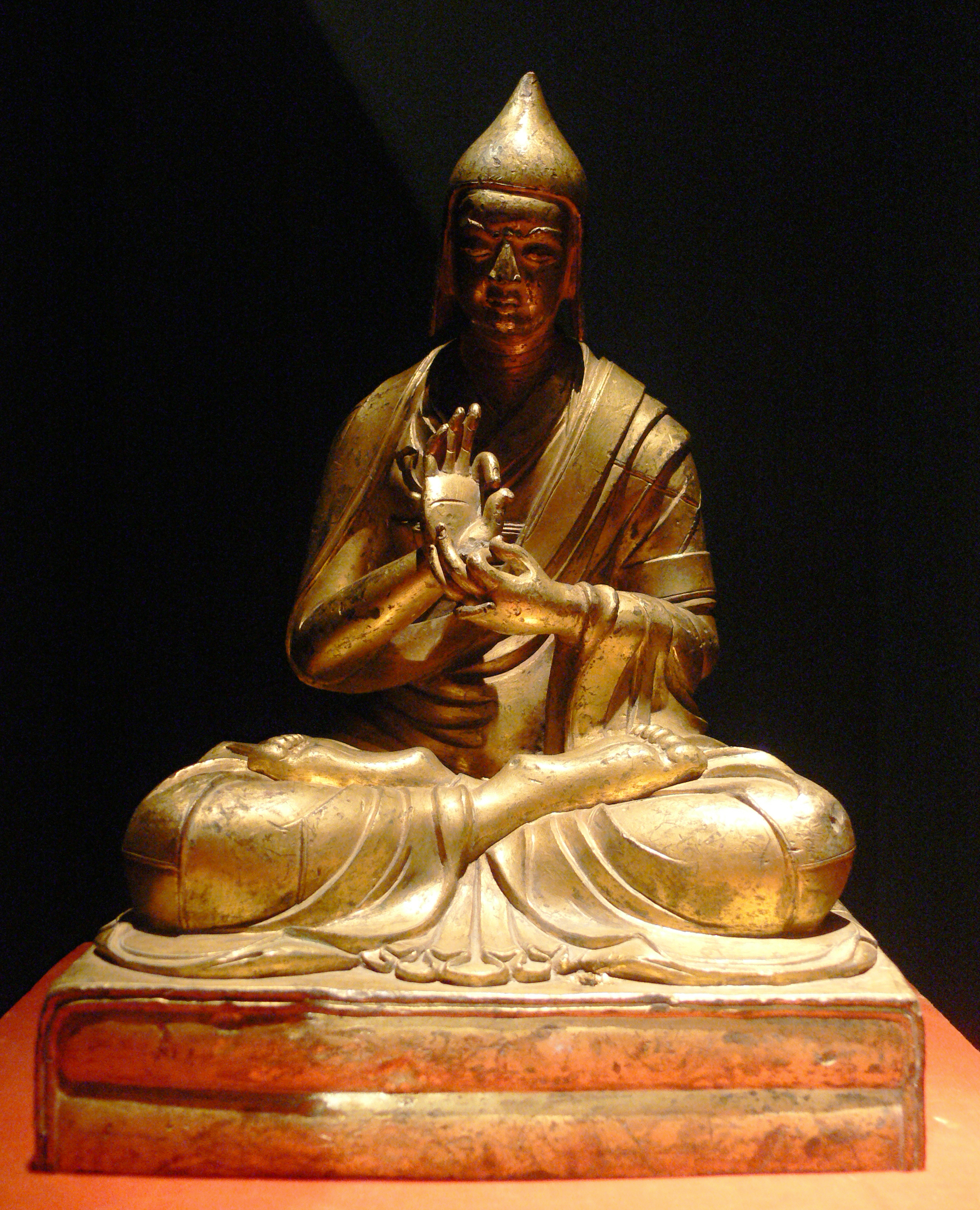
Statue of Tsongkhapa, Linden-Museum, Stuttgart

=== Mahayana Sutra Teachings ===
Tsongkhapa was acquainted with all Tibetan Buddhist traditions of his time, and received teachings and transmission in all major Sarma schools of Tibetan Buddhism. His main source of inspiration was the Kadam school of Atiśa (982–1054), especially the Kadampa Lamrim ("Stages of the Path") teachings. Another important source for Tsongkhapa are the works of Asanga, including the Yogacarabhumi and Abhidharma-samuccaya. He also draws on Kamalashila's Stages of Meditation and on Shantideva's works.

The most popular source for Tsongkhapa's teachings on the Mahayana sutra path is his Great Treatise on the Stages of the Path to Enlightenment (Lamrim Chenmo). He also wrote a Middle Length Lamrim Treatise and a Small Lamrim Treatise. Tsongkhapa's presentation generally follows the classic Kadam Lamrim system, which is divided into three main scopes or motivations (modest, medium and higher i.e. Mahayana).

Tsongkhapa's presentation of the Mahayana bodhisattva path focuses on the six perfections. Regarding the perfection of wisdom (prajñāpāramitā), Tsongkhapa emphasizes the importance of reasoning, analytical investigation as well as the close study and contemplation of the Buddhist scriptures. Indeed, according to Tsongkhapa, the broad study of the Buddhist texts is the “sacred life force of the path,” which is a necessary complement to the practice of meditation.

==== Insight meditation and the object of negation ====
For Tsongkhapa, all Buddhist forms of meditation can fall into two broad categories which must be balanced and fully developed together: calming meditation (śamatha), which are "meditations that engage and strengthen our capacity to focus and to stabilize the mind without distraction—culminating in perfect serenity" and insight meditations which "use and develop the capacity to discern and to analyze the qualities of an object—culminating in meditative wisdom".

In his Lamrim works, Tsongkhapa presents a unique way of mediation for the development of insight (Skt. vipaśyanā, Tib. lhag mthong). As Newland explains, for Tsongkhapa, the root of suffering and samsara is an "innate tendency to hold a distorted, reifying view of ourselves" (as well as of other phenomena). To develop the wisdom to see through this habit requires using reasoned analysis or analytical investigation (so sor rtog pa) to arrive at the right view of emptiness (the lack of intrinsic nature). (Note: In his Lamrim Chenmo, Tsongkhapa refers to opponents (Note: It is unclear which specific school of thought Tsongkhapa refers here to.) who argue that it is absurd "to conduct the extensive rational analysis required for refutations and proofs [which] is to meander among mere conventional words," because "if something exists, it cannot be refuted, and, if it does not exist, it need not be refuted." In response, Tsonghkhapa refers to Nagarjuna’s Refutation of Objections, among other texts, : "What use is it to establish the negation if what does not exist anyway, even without words? To answer that, the words “does not exist” Cause understanding; they do not eliminate." HTsongkhapa also quotes Nagarjuna's Commentary on Refutation of Objections: "The words, “All things lack intrinsic nature,” do not cause things to lack intrinsic nature, but, in the absence of intrinsic nature, they do make it understood that things lack intrinsic nature." Tsongkhapa then gives the following paraphrased example. If a person named Devadatta is not in the house, but someone says, “Devadatta is in the house.” Then in order to show that Devadatta is not there, someone else will say, “Devadatta is not there.” Those words do not cause Devadatta not to be there but allow the first person to understand that Devadatta is not in the house. Similarly, the words, “Things lack intrinsic nature,” do not cause things to lack intrinsic nature, but help those confused by ignorance to gain a valid cognition of reality.) Establishing the correct view of emptiness initially requires us to 'identify the object of negation', which according to Tsongkhapa (quoting Chandrakirti) is "a consciousness that superimposes an essence of things". If we do not do this correctly, we may end up either negating too much (which could lead nihilism, with negative consequences for our ethics) or negating too little (and thus leaving some subtle sense of reification untouched). Thus, for Tsongkhapa, we first need to properly identify and understand our own inner sense of reification. It is only after we have identified this in ourselves that we can refute and eliminate this error through introspective analysis, contemplation and meditation.

At the same time, we also must avoid the trap of a nihilistic view that invalidates the dependently arisen nature of things (i.e. mere existence or seeming reality) and confuses the lack of intrinsic nature with totally negating the existence of a relative and conventional self. This is because, for Tsongkhapa, the "I" or self is accepted as nominally existing in a dependent and conventional way, while the object to be negated is the inner fiction of intrinsic nature which is "erroneously reified" by our cognition. (Note: See: * Hopkins: "[I]f you have understood the view of the Middle Way School, you may conceive the I as only being nominally existent." * Tsongkhapa: "“self” refers to mere essential or intrinsic existence and also refers to the object of an awareness that simply thinks, “I.” Of these two, the former is the object negated by reason, whereas the latter is accepted conventionally, so it is not refuted.") Tsongkhapa explains this mistaken inner reification which is to be negated as "a natural belief [a naive, normal, pre-philosophical way of seeing the world], which leads us to perceive things and events as possessing some kind of intrinsic existence and identity". (Note: It is the conception that conventional phenomena have an "ontological status—a way of existing—in and of themselves, without being posited through the force of an awareness."Tsongkhapa goes on to say: "The referent object that is thus apprehended by that ignorant conception, the independent ontological status of those phenomena, is identified as [the] hypothetical “self” or “intrinsic nature.” Lama Tsongkhapa further explains: "Suppose that we leave aside analysis of how [phenomena] appear—i.e., how they appear to a conventional awareness—and analyze the objects themselves, asking, 'What is the manner of being of these phenomena?' We find they are not established in any way. Ignorance does not apprehend phenomena in this way; it apprehends each phenomenon as having a manner of being such that it can be understood in and of itself, without being posited through the force of a conventional consciousness. According to Tsongkhapa, "[that] what exists objectively in terms of its own essence without being posited through the power of a subjective mind is called [...] 'intrinsic nature'” or ignorance Tsongkhapa goes on to say: "The absence of this quality in the person is called the selflessness of the person; its absence in phenomena such as eyes, ears, and so forth is called the selflessness of objects. Hence, one may implicitly understand that the conceptions of that intrinsic nature as present in persons and objects are the conceptions of the two selves.") (Note: The Indo-Tibetan rope & snake analogy explains this further. Under low light, the thought might arise that a striped rope on the ground is a snake, "but there is nothing on top of or inside this rope [...] to which we could" validly apply the term and therefore establish a conventionally existing snake. The Dalai Lama expands: "Like this example, a thought of 'me' may arise on the basis of the aggregate factors of our experience. But there is nothing about these aggregates as the basis for labeling - not any of their parts, nor the collection or network of their parts, nor their continuum over time, nor something separate and apart from them - which is a basis with the defining characteristic making it 'me,' to which we could possibly apply the name 'me.' That being the case, this 'me' is nothing more than simply what can be designated by a mental label on the basis of aggregate factors of experience. In reality, the self of persons, objects, and abstracts is like the term-concept "snake" being designated upon a rope, "the snake is merely what can be designated by a mental label." Like this, the object of negation or ignorance is viewed to be the thought and perception which grasps the self of persons and objects to be established within their respective bases of designation. To put this in somewhat simpler terms, the thought and perception which grasps persons, things, and abstracts phenomena as existing in-and-of themselves - with characteristics or an identity of their own - is seen to be ignorance in this system.)

The process of refuting the intrinsic existence of the self is described in chapter 23 of Lamrim Chenmo vol. 3, and entails four steps: (Note: It has become a stock procedure of the Gelugpa:See, for example, Jeffrey Hopkins'ontroduction to the Kalachakra Tantra.)

- The refutation of the position that the self is one with the aggregates;
- The refutation of the position that the self is different from the aggregates;
- How those arguments also refute each of the remaining positions;
- How the person appears like an illusion based on that refutation.

According to Tsongkhapa, Buddhist essentialists (like Vaibhasikas) and non-Buddhist essentialists (atmavadins) are not negating the correct object, but are only negating "imaginary constructs" and "acquired ignorance" and thus they only realize a coarse selflessness which only suppresses, but not removes, the obstructions to liberation from samsara. (Note: Tsonghkhapa: "Based on just this [intrinsic nature], the referent object of the way that ignorance apprehends things as explained above, essentialist schools—Buddhist and non-Buddhist—reify many different things. When you negate the referent of ignorance’s cognitive process, you completely stop all of these tenet-driven reifications, as though you cut a tree at its root. Therefore, those who have the faculty of wisdom should understand that the referent object of innate ignorance is the basic object of negation and should not devote themselves merely to refuting imaginary constructs that are imputed only by the advocates of philosophical tenets. [...] What binds all living beings in cyclic existence is innate ignorance; acquired ignorance exists only among those who advocate philosophical tenets, so it cannot be the root of cyclic existence. It is extremely important to gain specific and certain knowledge of this point.") (Note: Daniel Cozort explaining this idea in greater detail:"A second category of tenets is concerned with implications of the Mahayana and Hinayana path structures. For the most part, they are tenets propounded to demonstrate that some persons who are regarded by other schools as Arhats liberated beings-are only ersatz Arhats, having realized only a coarse selflessness and having thereby suppressed, but not removed from the root, the obstructions to liberation. These tenets, then, revolve around the unique Prasangika assertion that the root of cyclic existence is the conception of inherent existence, which is more subtle than the conception of a self described by other systems of tenets. Five assertions are elucidated in this regard: One must realize emptiness in order to become liberated and therefore some "Arhats" who have only realized a coarse selflessness are not actually liberated.; There is desire that either is, or is thoroughly mixed with, the conception of true existence, and so-called Arhats still have this sort of desire.; Although some of these "Arhats" do indeed have yogic direct perception of the four noble truths, one does not have to be an Arhat or even a Superior (one who has directly realized emptiness) in order to have such yogic direct perception.; Although some of these "Arhats" have indeed realized the coarse aspects of the four noble truths, such a realization is not sufficient to overcome the obstructions to liberation.; Since true cessations, the irrevocable cessation of some portion of the afflictions of desire, hatred, etc., are also emptinesses, such "Arhats" who have not realized emptiness could not have experienced true cessations, i.e., could not have overcome the afflictive obstructions.") According to Tsongkhapa, only a negation which undercuts the innate perception of an inherently existing self is truly liberating. (Note: Chandrakirti: "When knowing selflessness, some eliminate a permanent self, but we do not consider this to be the basis of the conception of "I." It is therefore astonishing to claim that knowing this selflessness expunges and uproots the view of the self. [This is equivalent to] if someone sees a snake living in the wall of his house. To ease his concern, someone else says, 'there is no elephant there.' Alas, to others it is ridiculous that this would expel the fear of the snake.)

Tsongkhapa rejects the idea that meditation is only about throwing away all concepts, instead, we need to gradually refine our understanding until it becomes non-conceptual wisdom. While Tsongkhapa emphasizes the importance of attaining the correct conceptual understanding of emptiness through this analytical contemplation, he also understands that this knowledge is not the actual realization of emptiness itself (which is non-conceptual and non-dualistic). As such, according to Tsongkhapa, after one has attained the correct conceptual understanding of emptiness, this insight needs to be refined through repeated calming meditation practice (and the samadhi which it produces) and continued familiarization with insight meditation. Over time, one's insight is transformed into a nondualistic and non-conceptual experience of emptiness.

=== Vajrayana (Secret Mantra) ===
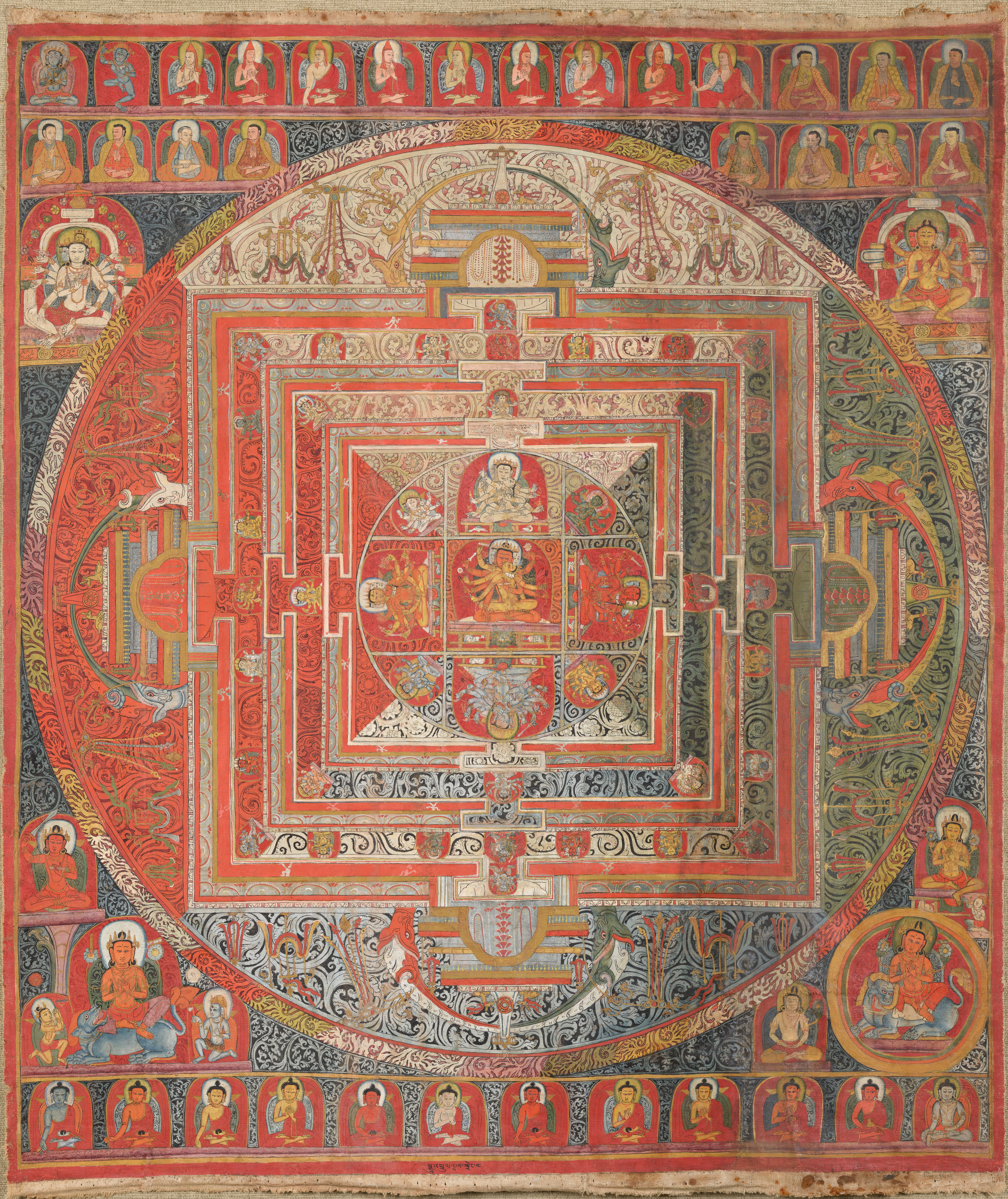
Guhyasamāja mandala with Mañjuvajra as the central deity

Tsongkhapa also practised and taught extensively on Vajrayana (i.e. Secret Mantra) Buddhism. He wrote commentaries on some of the main Sarma tantras, including the Vajrabhairava, Cakrasaṃvara, Kālacakra and Guhyasamāja tantras. He also wrote a grand summary of tantric thought and practice, The Great Exposition of Secret Mantra. Tsongkhapa's tantric theory draws extensively on the two main commentarial traditions of the Guhyasamāja Tantra. Tsongkhapa also heavily relies on the works of Marpa Lotsawa (1012–1097) and Butön Rinchendrub (1290–1364), both of whom passed down lineages of the Guhyasamāja tantra, a text which Tsongkhapa considered to be the "king of tantras". His close connection to the Guhyasamāja tradition was such that he referred to himself as a "Guhyasamāja yogi" and saw himself as a reviver and reformer of the tradition (and thus he composed various works on this tantric tradition).

For Tsongkhapa, Buddhist tantra is based on the same madhyamaka view of emptiness as sutra (non-tantric) Mahāyāna and that they both also share the same goal (Buddhahood). As such, Tsongkhapa sees Secret Mantra as being a subset of Mahāyāna Buddhism, and thus it also requires bodhicitta and insight into emptiness (through vipaśyanā meditation) as a foundation. Secret Mantra is only differentiated from sutra by its special method, the esoteric practice of deity yoga (Tib. lha'i rnal 'byor), which is a much faster method than the practice of the six perfections alone. Tsongkhapa also argues that complete Buddhahood can ultimately only be attained through the practice of Highest Yoga Tantra (while the lower practices of the perfections and the other tantras aid one in advancing on the path). However, Tsongkhapa also holds that non-tantric Mahāyāna practices are indispensable the practice of Secret Mantra and that bodhicitta is the basis for the practice of both sutra Mahāyāna and Secret Mantra.

Thus, for Tsongkhapa, the sutra bodhisattva path (and its three principal aspects of renunciation, bodhicitta and insight into emptiness) must precede the practice of Secret Mantra. Indeed, according to Tsongkhapa, without having ascertained emptiness, one cannot practice the tantric yogas of Vajrayana. As Tsongkhapa states in A Lamp to Illuminate the Five Stages:

for those who enter the Vajra Vehicle, it is necessary to search for an understanding of the view that has insight into the no-self emptiness and then to meditate upon its significance in order to abandon holding to reality, the root of samsara.

== Works ==
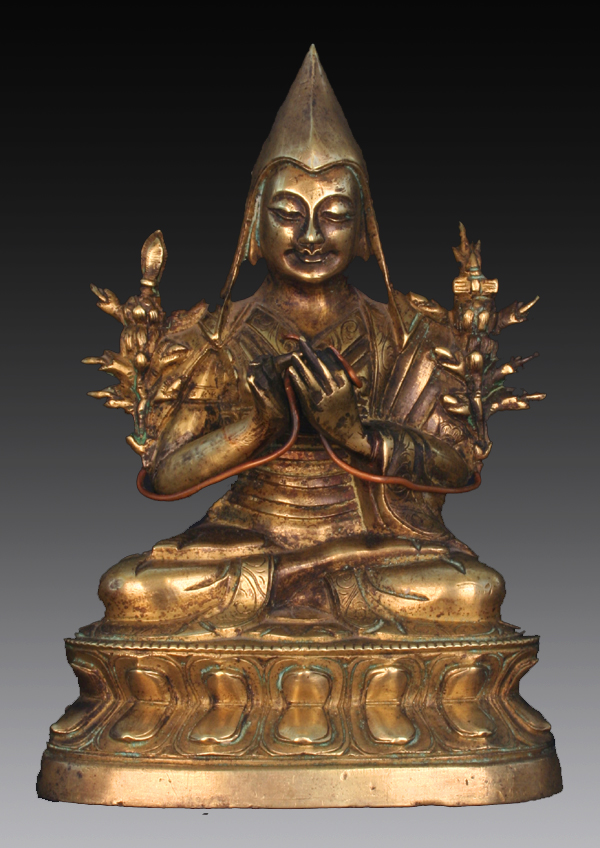
Bronze depicting Tsongkhapa, who is known and revered by Mongolians as Bogd Zonkhova

Tsongkhapa promoted the study of pramana (epistemology), encouraged formal debates as part of Dharma studies, and instructed disciples in the Guhyasamāja, Kalachakra, and Hevajra Tantras. Tsongkhapa's writings comprise eighteen volumes, with the largest amount being on Guhyasamāja tantra. These 18 volumes contain hundreds of titles relating to all aspects of Buddhist teachings and clarify some of the most difficult topics of Sutrayana and Vajrayana teachings. Tsongkhapa's main treatises and commentaries on Madhyamaka are based on the tradition descended from Nagarjuna as elucidated by Buddhapālita and Candrakīrti.

=== Major works ===
Some of the major works of Tsongkhapa are:

- The Great Treatise on the Stages of the Path to Enlightenment (lam rim chen mo),
- The Great Exposition of Secret Mantra (sngags rim chen mo),
- Essence of True Eloquence (drang nges legs bshad snying po; full title: gsung rab kyi drang ba dang nges pai don rnam par phye ba gsal bar byed pa legs par bshad pai snying po),
- Ocean of Reasoning: A Great Commentary on Nagarjuna's Mulamadhyamakakarika (dbu ma rtsa ba'i tshig le'ur byas pa shes rab ces bya ba'i rnam bshad rigs pa'i rgya mtsho),
- Illumination of the Meaning of the Middle Path (dbu ma dgongs pa rab gsal), a commentary on Candrakirti's Madhyamakavatara,
- Brilliant Illumination of the Lamp of the Five Stages / A Lamp to Illuminate the Five Stages (gsang 'dus rim lnga gsal sgron), a commentary on Guhyasamaja,
- Golden Garland of Eloquence (gser phreng), a commentary to the Ornament for the Clear Realizations (Abhisamayālaṃkāra),
- The Praise of Relativity (rten 'brel bstod pa).

=== English translations ===
Biography

- Life and Teachings of Tsongkhapa, Library of Tibetan Works and Archives, 2006. ISBN 978-81-86470-44-2.

Lam Rim Chenmo

- The Great Treatise On The Stages Of The Path To Enlightenment, Vol. 1, Snow Lion. ISBN 1-55939-152-9.
- The Great Treatise On The Stages Of The Path To Enlightenment, Vol. 2, Snow Lion. ISBN 1-55939-168-5.
- The Great Treatise On The Stages Of The Path To Enlightenment, Vol. 3, Snow Lion. ISBN 1-55939-166-9.
- Calming the Mind and Discerning the Real: From the Lam rim chen mo of Tson-kha-pa, trans. Alex Wayman, Columbia University Press. ISBN 0-23104-404-6.
- Dependent-Arising and Emptiness: A Tibetan Buddhist Interpretation of Mādhyamika Philosophy, trans. Elizabeth Napper, Wisdom Publications. ISBN 0-86171-364-8: this volume "considers the special insight section of" the Lam Rim (p. 8).

Medium Lam Rim

- The Medium Treatise On The Stages Of The Path To Enlightenment – Calm Abiding Section translated in "Balancing The Mind: A Tibetan Buddhist Approach To Refining Attention", Shambhala Publications, 2005. ISBN 978-1-55939-230-3.
- The Medium Treatise On The Stages Of The Path To Enlightenment – Insight Section translated in "Life and Teachings of Tsongkhapa", Library of Tibetan Works and Archives, 2006. ISBN 978-81-86470-44-2.
- The Medium Treatise on the Stages of the Path to Enlightenment (Calm Abiding Section), translated in B. Alan Wallace, Dissertation, 1995 (Wylie: byang chub lam gyi rim pa chung ba).

Small Lam Rim

- Wallace, B. Alan (1995), The Cultivation of Sustained Voluntary Attention in Indo-Tibetan Buddhism – Small Exposition of the Stages of the Path to Enlightenment.

Golden Garland of Eloquence

- Golden Garland of Eloquence – Volume 1 of 4: First Abhisamaya, Jain Pub Co, 2008. ISBN 0-89581-865-5.
- Golden Garland of Eloquence – Volume 2 of 4: Second and Third Abhisamayas, Jain Pub Co, 2008. ISBN 0-89581-866-3.
- Golden Garland of Eloquence – Volume 3 of 4: Fourth Abhisamaya, Jain Pub Co, 2010. ISBN 0-89581-867-1.
- Golden Garland of Eloquence – Volume 4 of 4: Fourth Abhisamaya, Jain Pub Co, 2013. ISBN 978-0-89581-868-3.

Madhyamaka

- Ocean of Reasoning: A Great Commentary on Nagarjuna's Mulamadhyamakakarika, Oxford University Press. ISBN 0-19-514733-2.
- Essence of True Eloquence, translated in The Central Philosophy of Tibet, Princeton University Press. ISBN 0-691-02067-1.
- Guided Tour Through the Seven Books of Dharmakirti, translated in A Millennium of Buddhist Logic, Motilal Barnasidass, 1999. ISBN 81-208-1646-3.

Tantra

- The Fulfillment of All Hopes: Guru Devotion in Tibetan Buddhism, Wisdom Publications. ISBN 0-86171-153-X.
- Tantric Ethics: An Explanation of the Precepts for Buddhist Vajrayana Practice, Wisdom Publications. ISBN 0-86171-290-0.
- The Great Exposition of Secret Mantra - Chapter 1 of 13, translated in Tantra in Tibet, Shambhala Publications, 1987. ISBN 978-0-937938-49-2.
- The Great Exposition of Secret Mantra - Chapter 2 & 3 of 13, translated in Deity Yoga, Shambhala Publications, 1987. ISBN 978-0-937938-50-8.
- The Great Exposition of Secret Mantra - Chapter 4 of 13, translated in Yoga Tantra, Shambhala Publications, 2012. ISBN 978-1-55939-898-5.
- The Great Exposition of Secret Mantra - Chapter 11 & 12 of 13, translated in Great Treatise on the Stages of Mantra: Chapters XI–XII (The Creation Stage), Columbia University Press, 2013. ISBN 978-1-935011-01-9.
- The Six Yogas of Naropa: Tsongkhapa's Commentary, Snow Lion Publications. ISBN 1-55939-234-7.

Lamp of the Five Stages

- Brilliant Illumination of the Lamp of the Five Stages, Columbia University Press, 2011. ISBN 978-1-935011-00-2.
- A Lamp to Illuminate the Five Stages, Library of Tibetan Classics, 2013. ISBN 0-86171-454-7.

Yogacara

- Ocean of Eloquence: Tsong Kha Pa's Commentary on the Yogacara Doctrine of Mind, State University of New York Press. ISBN 0-7914-1479-5.

Other

- The Splendor of an Autumn Moon: The Devotional Verse of Tsongkhapa, Wisdom Publications. ISBN 978-0-86171-192-5.
- Three Principal Aspects of the Path, Tharpa Publications.
- Stairway to Nirvāṇa: A Study of the Twenty Saṃghas based on the works of Tsong-kha-pa, James B. Apple, State University of New York Press, 2008. ISBN 978-0-7914-7376-4.

== See also ==
- Galdan Namchot

== Notes ==
Subnotes

== Sources ==
Primary (in English Translation)

- Tsong Khapa (2014), The great treatise on the stages of the path to enlightenment: Volume 1, Snow Lion Publications, ISBN 978-1559394420
- Tsong Khapa (2014), The great treatise on the stages of the path to enlightenment: Volume 2, Snow Lion Publications, ISBN 978-1559394437
- Tsong Khapa (2014), The great treatise on the stages of the path to enlightenment: Volume 3, Snow Lion Publications, ISBN 978-1559394444
- Tsongkhapa (2016), The Great Exposition of Secret Mantra, Volume One: Tantra in Tibet (Revised Edition), translated by Hopkins, Jeffrey, with commentry by The Dalai Lama, Shambhala Publications, ISBN 9781611803600
- Tsongkhapa (2017), The Great Exposition of Secret Mantra, Volume Two: Deity Yoga (Revised Edition), translated by Hopkins, Jeffrey, with commentry by The Dalai Lama, Shambhala Publications, ISBN 9781611803600
- Tsongkhapa (2017), The Great Exposition of Secret Mantra, Volume Three: Yoga Tantra (Revised Edition), translated by Hopkins, Jeffrey, with commentry by The Dalai Lama, Shambhala Publications, ISBN 9781611803600
- Tsongkhapa (2012), A Lamp to Illuminate the Five Stages: Teachings on Guhyasamaja Tantra, translated by Gavin Kilty, Simon and Schuster
- Shantarakshita (2005), The Adornment of the Middle Way, with commentry by Ju Mipham, Padmakara Translation, ISBN 1-59030-241-9

Secondary

- Brunnhölzl, Karl (2004). The Center of the Sunlit Sky: Madhyamaka in the Kagyu Tradition. Snow Lion Publications. ISBN 978-1-55939-955-5.
- Cabezón, José Ignacio (2005), "Tsong Kha Pa", in Jones, Lindsay (ed.), MacMillan Encyclopedia of Religion, MacMillan
- Cabezón, José Ignacio; Dargyay, Geshe (2007). Freedom from Extremes: Gorampa's "Distinguishing the Views" and the Polemics of Emptiness. Wisdom Publications. ISBN 978-0-86171-523-7.
- Cowherds (2010). Moonshadows: Conventional Truth in Buddhist Philosophy. Oxford University Press. ISBN 9780199826506.
- Garfield, Jay L.; Thakchöe, Sonam (2011), "Identifying the Object of Negation and the Status of Conventional Truth: Why the dGag Bya Matters So Much to Tibetan Mādhyamikas", in Cowherds (ed.), Moonshadows: Conventional Truth in Buddhist Philosophy, Oxford University Press
- Hopkins, Jeffrey (1994), "A Tibetan Perspective on the Nature of Spiritual Experience", in Buswell, Jr., Robert E.; Gimello, Robert M. (eds.), Paths to Liberation. The Marga and its Transformations in Buddhist Thought, Motilal Banarsidass
- Hopkins, Jeffrey (1999), "Emptiness Yoga", Kalachakra Tantra. Rite of Initiation, Wisom Publications
- Jinpa, Thupten (2006), "negation, identyfying its object", in Leaman, Oliver (ed.), Encyclopedia of Asian Philosophy, Routledge
- Jinpa, Thupten (2019), Tsongkhapa: A Buddha in the Land of Snows, Shambhala Publications
- Newland, Guy (2008–2009), Introduction to Emptiness: As Taught in Tsong-kha-pa's Great Treatise on the Stages of the Path, Ithaca
- Newland, Guy (1999), Schijn en werkelijkheid. De twee waarheden in de vier boeddhistische leerstelsels, KunchabPublicaties
- Tsong Khapa (2002), The great treatise on the stages of the path to enlightenment: Volume 3, Snow Lion Publications, ISBN 1-55939-166-9
- Tsong Khapa (2006). Ocean of Reasoning: A Great Commentary on Nagarjuna's Mūlamadhyamakakarika translated by Geshe Ngawang Samten and Jay L. Garfield. Oxford University Press. ISBN 978-0-19-514732-2.
- van Schaik, Sam (2011). Tibet: a History. Yale University Press. ISBN 978-0-300-15404-7.
- Thakchoe, Sonam (2004). The Two Truths Debate: Tsongkhapa and Gorampa on the Middle Way. Wisdom Publications. ISBN 978-0-86171-501-5.
- Thurman, Robert (2009). Life and Teachings of Tsong Khapa. Library of Tibetan Works & Archives. ISBN 978-81-86470-44-2.
