= Middle Way =

Buddhist doctrine

The Middle Way or Middle Path (Pali: Majjhimāpaṭipadā; Sanskrit: Madhyamāpratipada) as well as "teaching the Dharma by the middle" (majjhena dhammaṃ deseti) are common Buddhist terms used to refer to two major aspects of the Dharma, that is, the teaching of the Buddha. (Note: Tibetan: དབུ་མའི་ལམ།, THL: Umélam; traditional Chinese: 中道; ; Vietnamese: Trung đạo; Thai: มัชฌิมาปฏิปทา; Burmese: အလယ်အလတ်လမ်းစဉ်. Also see the Pali version of the Dhammacakkappavattana Sutta (available online at SLTP, n.d.-b, sutta 12.2.1) where the phrase majjhimā patipadā is repeatedly used.) The first phrasing, the Middle Way, refers to a spiritual practice that steers clear of both extreme asceticism and sensual indulgence. This spiritual path is defined as the Noble Eightfold Path that leads to awakening. The second formulation, "teaching the Dharma by the middle," refers to how the Buddha's Dharma (Teaching) approaches ontological issues of existence and personal identity by avoiding eternalism (or absolutism) and annihilationism (or nihilism).

== Early Buddhist texts ==
In the early Buddhist texts, there are two aspects of the Middle Way taught by the Buddha. Scholar David Kalupahana describes these as the "philosophical" Middle Way and the "practical" Middle Way. He associates these with the teachings found in the Kaccānagotta-sutta and the Dhammacakkappavattana Sutta respectively.

=== The Middle Way (majjhimāpaṭipadā) ===
In the Early Buddhist Texts, the term "Middle Path" (Majjhimāpaṭipadā) was used in the Dhammacakkappavattana Sutta (SN 56.11, and its numerous parallel texts), which the Buddhist tradition regards to be the first teaching that the Buddha delivered after his awakening. (Note: Samyutta Nikaya, 56:11. See) In this sutta, the Buddha describes the Noble Eightfold Path as the Middle Way which steers clear of the extremes of sensual indulgence and self-mortification:

Monks, these two extremes ought not to be practiced by one who has gone forth from the household life. There is an addiction to indulgence of sense-pleasures, which is low, coarse, the way of ordinary people, unworthy, and unprofitable; and there is an addiction to self-mortification, which is painful, unworthy, and unprofitable.
Avoiding both these extremes, the Perfect One has realized the Middle Path; it gives vision, gives knowledge, and leads to calm, to insight, to enlightenment and to Nibbana. And what is that Middle Path realized by the Tathagata...? It is the Noble Eightfold Path, and nothing else, namely: right understanding, right thought, right speech, right action, right livelihood, right effort, right mindfulness and right concentration.

A similar passage occurs in other suttas such as Araṇavibhaṅgasutta (MN 139) with a Chinese parallel at MA 169 as well as in MN 3 (Chinese parallels at MA 88 and EA 18.3).

Indologist Johannes Bronkhorst concludes that the first extreme mentioned here "indulgence in desirable sense objects" does not refer to a specific religious movement or practice, but to the actions of common people. However, the other extreme does presuppose ascetics who used "devotion to self-mortification" to reach a religious goal.

The Buddhist texts depict (and criticize) Jain ascetics as those who practice extreme self-mortification (Bronkhorst cites MN 14). Early Buddhist sources (such as MN 36) also depict the Buddha practicing those ascetic practices before his awakening and how the Buddha abandoned them because they are not efficacious. Some of these extreme practices include a "meditation without breathing", and extreme fasting which leads to emaciation as well as the total suppression of bodily movement while standing and refusing to lie down. According to the scriptural account, when the Buddha delivered the Dhammacakkappavattana Sutta, he was addressing five ascetics with whom he had previously practiced severe ascetic practices. (Note: See, for instance, the Mahasaccaka Sutta ("The Longer Discourse to Saccaka," MN 36 Thanissaro, 1998).)

As noted by Y. Karunadasa, this middle path "does not mean moderation or a compromise between the two extremes" rather, it means as the sutta states "without entering either of the two extremes" (ubho ante anupagamma).

A sutta from the Anguttara Nikaya (AN 3.156–162) also discusses the middle path as well as two other "paths", the addicted practice and the scorching path, referring to the two extremes. The addicted path is described as when someone thinks that there is nothing wrong with sensual pleasures "so they throw themselves into sensual pleasures." Meanwhile, the scorching path includes numerous "ways of mortifying and tormenting the body" including going naked, restricting their food intake in various ways, wearing various kinds of rough clothing, "they tear out their hair and beard," "they constantly stand, refusing seats," they maintain the squatting posture, and "they lie on a mat of thorns". The middle path meanwhile is described by listing the thirty seven aids to awakening.

=== Teaching by the Middle (majjhena desanā) ===
Other early sources like the Kaccānagotta-sutta also state that "the Tathagatha teaches by the middle way" (majjhena tathāgato dhammaṃ deseti) which often refers to the doctrine of dependent origination as a view between the extremes of eternalism and annihilationism as well as the extremes of existence and non-existence. Gethin 78

According to Bhikkhu Bodhi, there are two extreme metaphysical views that are avoided through the Buddha's "teaching by the middle" (majjhena dhammaṃ):

- Eternalism (sassatavāda), this refers to the view that there is "an indestructible and eternal self, whether individual or universal". It can also refer to the idea that the world is maintained by a permanent being or entity, like God or some other eternal metaphysical Absolute. The main problem with this view is that it leads to grasping at the five aggregates, which are impermanent and empty of a self.
- Annihilationism (ucchedavāda), is the idea that a person is utterly annihilated at death and there is nothing which survives. The main problem with this view is that it leads to nihilism, particularly ethical nihilism.

According to Bodhi, by steering clear of both of these extremes, dependent origination teaches that "existence is constituted by a current of conditioned phenomena devoid of a metaphysical self yet continuing on from birth to birth as long as the causes that sustain it remain effective."

One of the most famous and clear expositions of dependent origination is found in the Kaccānagotta-sutta." The Kaccānagotta-sutta (SN 12.15 with Chinese Agama parallels at SA 262 and SA 301 and also a Sanskrit parallel Kātyāyanaḥsūtra) explains the middle way view as follows:

Kaccāna, this world mostly relies on the dual notions of existence and non-existence. But when you truly see the origin of the world with right understanding, you won't have the notion of non-existence regarding the world. And when you truly see the cessation of the world with right understanding, you won't have the notion of existence regarding the world. The world is for the most part shackled by attraction, grasping, and insisting. But if—when it comes to this attraction, grasping, mental fixation, insistence, and underlying tendency—you don't get attracted, grasp, and commit to the notion 'my self', you'll have no doubt or uncertainty that what arises is just suffering arising, and what ceases is just suffering ceasing. Your knowledge about this is independent of others.

This is how right view is defined. 'All exists': this is one extreme. 'All doesn't exist': this is the second extreme. Avoiding these two extremes, the Realized One teaches by the middle way: 'Ignorance is a condition for choices. Choices are a condition for consciousness. … [the rest of the 12 elements of dependent origination follow]

A similar passage is also found in SN 12.47. According to David Kalupahana, the terms "existence" (atthitā) and "non-existence" (natthitā) are referring to two absolutist theories (which were common in Indian philosophy at the time): the doctrine of permanent existence found in the Upanishads and the doctrine of non-existence (at death) of the materialist Carvaka school.

==== Dependent origination and personal identity ====
"Dependent origination" (pratītyasamutpāda) describes the existence of phenomena as coming about due to various causes and conditions. When one of these causes changes or disappears, the resulting object or phenomena will also change or disappear, as will the objects or phenomena depending on the changing object or phenomena. Thus, there is nothing with an eternal self, essence or atman, there are only mutually dependent origination and existence (hence, the middle doctrine avoids an eternal substance or being). However, the absence of an atman does not mean there is nothing at all (hence, the middle doctrine avoids nihilism). Therefore, according to Rupert Gethin, the "middle" doctrine of early Buddhism, when applied to the question of personal identity is closely connected with the Buddhist understanding of causality and with the doctrine of not-self (anatta). 143

The connection between dependent origination and personal identity is explored in SN 12.35. In this sutta, a monk asks the Buddha the following question regarding the 12 links of dependent origination: "what now is aging-and-death, and for whom is there this aging-and-death?" The Buddha responds:

"Not a valid question," the Blessed One replied. "Bhikkhu, whether one says, 'What now is aging-and-death, and for whom is there this aging-and-death?' or whether one says, 'Aging-and-death is one thing, the one for whom there is this aging-and-death is another'—both these assertions are identical in meaning; they differ only in the phrasing. If there is the view, 'The soul and the body are the same,' there is no living of the holy life; and if there is the view, 'The soul is one thing, the body is another,' there is no living of the holy life. Without veering towards either of these extremes, the Tathagata teaches the Dhamma by the middle: 'With birth as condition, aging-and-death.'"

Another passage which discusses personal identity with regard to the middle teaching is found in the Aññatarabrāhmaṇasutta (SN 12.46, with a Chinese parallel at SA 300). This sutta outlines two further extreme views with regards to personal identity and karma:

- "'The person who does the deed experiences the result': this is one extreme."
- "'One person does the deed and another experiences the result': this is the second extreme.

The Timbarukasutta outlines a similar set of two extremes regarding personality:

"Suppose that the feeling and the one who feels it are the same thing. Then for one who has existed since the beginning, pleasure and pain is made by oneself. I don't say this. Suppose that the feeling is one thing and the one who feels it is another. Then for one stricken by feeling, pleasure and pain is made by another. I don't say this. Avoiding these two extremes, the Realized One teaches by the middle way: 'Ignorance is a condition for choices.

The discourse then states that the Buddha teaches by the middle and outlines the twelve elements of dependent origination. Gethin states that for early Buddhism, personal continuity is explained through the particular way that the various phenomena which make up a sentient being are causally connected.143 According to Gethin, this middle teaching "sees a 'person' as subsisting in the causal connectedness of dependent arising". (Note: Gethin's endnote (p. 290, n. 22) then references SN 12.17. See Thanissaro 2005)) Therefore, thinking that there is something unchanging and constant in a person is eternalistic, while thinking that there is no real connection between the same person at different points in time is annihilationist. As Gethin writes:

In other words, if we deny that there is a real connectedness between events this is annihilationism, but if we understand that connectedness in terms of an unchanging self this is eternalism; the middle way is that there is only the connectedness, there is only dependent arising.

"Dependent origination" also gives a rationale for rebirth:

Conditioned Arising is [...] a 'Middle Way' which avoids the extremes of 'eternalism' and 'annihilationism': the survival of an eternal self, or the total annihilation of a person at death.

== Theravāda Buddhism ==
In the Theravāda Buddhist tradition, the usage of the term "Middle Way" is discussed in 5th-century CE Pali commentaries. The Pali commentary to the Samyutta Nikaya (SN) states:

The Tathāgata teaches the Dhamma by the middle without veering to either of these extremes—eternalism or annihilationism—having abandoned them without reservation. He teaches while being established in the middle way. What is that Dhamma? By the formula of dependent origination, the effect is shown to occur through the cause and to cease with the cessation of the cause, but no agent or experiencer (karaka, vedaka) is described.

Regarding the Kaccānagotta-sutta, the SN commentary glosses the key statements as follows:

The origin of the world: the production of the world of formations. There is no notion of nonexistence in regard to the world: there does not occur in him the annihilationist view that might arise in regard to phenomena produced and made manifest in the world of formations, holding "They do not exist." The cessation of the world: the dissolution (bhanga) of formations. There is no notion of existence in regard to the world: There does not occur in him the eternalist view which might arise in regard to phenomena produced and made manifest in the world of formations, holding "They exist." Further, "the origin of the world" is direct-order conditionality (anuloma-paccayākāra); "the cessation of the world," reverse-order conditionality (patiloma-paccayākāra).

The Pali sub-commentary to the SN states:

The notion of existence is eternalism because it maintains that the entire world (of personal existence) exists forever. The notion of nonexistence is annihilationism because it maintains that the entire world does not exist (forever) but is cut off.

The influential Theravāda doctrinal compendium called the Visuddhimagga states:

"Dependent origination" (paticca-samuppada) represents the middle way, which rejects the doctrines, 'He who acts is he who reaps' and 'One acts while another reaps' (S.ii.20) ..."

The metaphysical import of the "middle teaching" is interpreted in different ways by modern Theravada Buddhists.

Bhikkhu Bodhi comments on the Kaccānagotta-sutta as follows:

In view of these explanations it would be misleading to translate the two terms, atthita and natthita, simply as "existence" and "nonexistence" and then to maintain (as is sometimes done) that the Buddha rejects all ontological notions as inherently invalid. The Buddha's utterances at [SN] 22:94, for example, show that he did not hesitate to make pronouncements with a clear ontological import when they were called for. In the present passage atthita and natthita are abstract nouns formed from the verbs atthi and natthi. It is thus the metaphysical assumptions implicit in such abstractions that are at fault, not the ascriptions of existence and nonexistence themselves...While atthita is the notion of existence in the abstract, bhava is concrete individual existence in one or another of the three realms.

Bodhi also argues that what the noble disciple does see when reflecting on his personality with wisdom is "a mere assemblage of conditioned phenomena arising and passing away through the conditioning process governed by dependent origination." Regarding the Kaccānagotta-sutta, Thanissaro Bhikkhu writes:

this sutta is describing the state of mind of a person focusing on the origination or cessation of the data of the senses. A person in that state of mind would see nothing in that mode of perception that would give rise to thoughts of existence or non-existence with regard to those sense data. However, when people are engaging in discussions about things that do or do not appear in the world—as the Buddha is describing in SN 22:94—then the terms "exist" and "do not exist" would naturally occur to them. In other words, this sutta and SN 22:94 are not making different claims about the ontological status of the world. They are simply describing the types of concepts that do or don't occur to the mind when regarding the world in different ways.

Similarly, according to Ajahns Amaro and Pasanno, the Kaccānagotta-sutta "more describes a method of meditation practice than merely another philosophical position". The Ajahns further state that:

The advice given in the last passage closely matches the practice of vipassana (insight) meditation: this consists of, firstly, the calm and attentive observation of the arising of all patterns of experience. Secondly, it involves the seeing of all such patterns through the reflective lens of anicca-dukkha-anatta (impermanence, unsatisfactoriness, and not-self). Lastly, in the culmination of the process, there is the remainderless relinquishment of all experience. There is a complete acceptance of all that arises and no confusion about the fact that all patterns of experience are of the same dependent, insubstantial nature.

== Mahāyāna ==
In Mahāyāna Buddhism, the Middle Way refers to the insight into śūnyatā ("emptiness") that transcends the extremes of existence and non-existence. This has been interpreted in different ways by the various schools of Mahāyāna philosophy.

=== Madhyamaka ===
The Madhyamaka ("Middle Way") school defends a "Middle Way" position between the metaphysical view that things exist in some ultimate sense and the view that things do not exist at all.

Madhyamika philosophy, based on the Buddha's Perfection of Wisdom Sutras, was set forth by the great Indian master Nagarjuna. He was later followed by great masters such as Aryadeva, Buddhapalita, Bhavaviveka and Chandrakirti.

==== Nagarjuna ====
Nagarjuna's influential Mūlamadhyamakakārikā -‘The Fundamental Wisdom of the Middle Way’ (MMK) famously contains a reference to the Kaccāyanagotta Sutta in its 15th chapter. This chapter focuses on deconstructing the ideas of existence, non-existence and intrinsic nature, essence, or inherent existence (svabhāva) and show how such ideas are incoherent and incompatible with causality and dependent origination.

The MMK states:

4. Further, without intrinsic nature and extrinsic nature how can there be an existent (bhāva)? For an existent is established given the existence of either intrinsic nature or extrinsic nature.

5. If the existent is unestablished, then the nonexistent (abhāva) too is not established. For people proclaim the nonexistent to be the alteration of the existent.

6. Intrinsic nature and extrinsic nature, existent and nonexistent—who see these do not see the truth of the Buddha's teachings.

7. In "The Instructing of Katyāyana" both "it exists" and "it does not exist" are denied by the Blessed One, who clearly perceives the existent and the nonexistent.

MMK further discusses the two extremes as follows:

10. "It exists" is an eternalist view; "It does not exist" is an annihilationist idea. Therefore the wise one should not have recourse to either existence or nonexistence.

11. For whatever exists by its intrinsic nature does not become nonexistent; eternalism then follows. "It does not exist now [but] it existed previously"—from this, annihilation follows.

According to Mark Siderits and Shoryu Katsura, for Nagarjuna, the two extremes refer to:

the view that things exist having intrinsic nature and the view that the lack of intrinsic nature means that things are utterly unreal. The argument is that the first leads to the conclusion that ultimately real things are eternal, while the second leads to the conclusion that ultimately nothing whatsoever exists.

==== Aryadeva ====
Ayradeva was a student of Nagarjuna. His work the Four Hundred Stanzas on the Middle Way’ principally explains the meaning of Nagarjuna's work, but also includes refutations of non-Buddhist systems.

==== Buddhapalita ====
Buddhapālita-Mūlamadhyamakavṛtti, is a commentary on Nagarjuna's Mūlamadhyamakakarikā. He explains Nāgārjuna's work by pointing out the necessary but undesired consequences of an opponent's thesis, without maintaining any thesis of his own. This approach became later known as Prasangika Madhyamaka.

==== Bhāviveka ====
Bhāviveka was critical of Buddhapalita's approach to Madhyamaka. Inspired by the buddhist logician Dignāga he felt it was necessary to present syllogistic arguments which prove the Madhyamaka view. This later became known as Svatantrika Madhyamaka.

==== Chandrakirti ====
Chandrakirti defended Buddhaplita's position and critiqued Bhāviveka's approach. The sixth chapter of Chandrakirti's Madhyamakavatara, ‘Entering the Middle Way’ explains the meaning of Nagarjuna's work specifically from a Prasangika Madhyamika standpoint.

=== Yogācāra ===
The Yogācāra school examines emptiness through its central teaching of the three basic modes of existence or "three natures" (svabhāva). In Yogācāra, the ultimate basis for the erroneous conceptualizations we make about existence (like ideas of a self, etc.) is the Paratantra-svabhāva, which is the dependently originated nature of dharmas, or the causal process of the fabrication of things. According to the Mahāyānasaṃgraha (2:25) this basis is considered to be an ultimately existing (paramārtha) basis. However, this basis is empty since the events in this causal flow do not exist on their own and are dependent phenomena.

In Yogācāra, emptiness is understood mainly as an absence of duality which holds that ultimate reality is beyond all dualities like self and other (or any other concepts like 'physical' and 'non-physical', internal and external). All dualities are an unreal superimposition since ultimately there is only an interconnected causal stream of mental events.

Unlike Madhyamaka, Yogācāra philosophy argues that there is a sense in which consciousness can be said to exist, that is, it exists in a dependent and empty way. Indeed, Madhyamaka philosophers were criticized by Yogācārins like Asanga for being nihilistic (and thus, of having fallen from the middle way). According to Asanga "If nothing is real, there cannot be any ideas (prajñapti). Someone who holds this view is a nihilist." The Yogācāra position is that there is something that exists, the empty and purely mental (prajñapti-matra) stream of dependent arising. The Bodhisattvabhūmi argues that it is only logical to speak of emptiness if there is something that is empty.

=== Svatantrika-Yogachara Madhyamika ===
- Śāntarakṣita outlined his Svatantrika-Yogachara Madhyamika view in the Madhyamakālaṃkāra (The Ornament of the Middle Way).
- Kamalaśīla, a student of Sàntaraksita profounds this view in his presentation entitled 'The Stages of Meditation of Madhyamika (uma’i sgom rim)

=== Tibetan Buddhism ===
In Tibetan Buddhism, there are numerous interpretations of Madhyamaka philosophy, all of which represent the intent of the Buddha's middle way and the right view outlined by Nagarjuna. Among some of the most influential views are the following:

==== Rangtong - Empty of Self ====
This philosophy is upheld by the Gelug school.

- The Madhyamaka of Je Tsongkhapa (1357–1419) argues that emptiness is "an absolute negation" (med dgag), which means that everything, including Buddhahood and emptiness itself, is said to be empty. The target of this negation is said to be inherent existence or intrinsic nature. Therefore, in this system, the conventional existence of the world is not negated, only the essentialist superimposition of an intrinsic nature.

==== Shentong - 'Empty of other' ====
This philosophy is mainly propounded by non-Gelug Tibetan schools. Key figures who propound this view are: The third Karmapa, Rangjung Dorje (Karma Kagyu), Longchen Rabjam (Nyingma), Dolpopa Sherab Gyaltsen (Jonang), Sakya Chokden (Sakya) and Taranatha (Jonang).

- Dölpopa's (1292–1361) held that ultimate reality is only empty of what is impermanent and conditioned, but it is not empty of its own true nature. Buddhahood is therefore not held to be totally empty in this system, instead, it is an ultimately real self that is filled with infinite Buddha qualities. This philosophy is very influential among non-Gelug Tibetan schools.
- The Madhyamaka interpretation of Gorampa (1429–1489) has also been very influential among non-Gelug Tibetan orders. Gorampa's interpretation is an anti-realist philosophy which sees emptiness as meaning that all phenomena lack the four extremes: existence, nonexistence, both and neither. Therefore, in this interpretation of Madhyamaka, conventional everyday reality is also negated and is seen as unreal, illusory, and ultimately non-existent since they are just conceptual fabrications.

Other important presentations include:

- Eighth Karmapa Mikyö Dorje's commentary on Chandrakırti's Entering the Middle Way, entitled ‘Chariot of the Dagpo Kagu Siddhas’.
- Ninth Karmapa Wangchuk Dorje's commentary entitled ‘Feast for the Fortunate’.
- Pawo Rinpoche Tsuglag Trengwa's ‘Exposition of The Entrance to the Bodhisattva's Way of Life, the Essence of the Immeasurable, Profound, and Vast Ocean of the Dharma of the Great Vehicle’. The ninth chapter of this text propounds many of Mikyö Dorje's explanations on Madhyamaka.

=== East Asian conceptions ===
==== Tendai ====
In the Tendai school, the Middle Way refers to the synthesis of the thesis that all things are śūnyatā and the antithesis that all things have phenomenal existence.

==== Chan Buddhism ====
In Chan Buddhism, the Middle Way describes the realization of being free of the one-sidedness of perspective that takes the extremes of any polarity as objective reality. In chapter ten of the Platform Sutra, Huineng gives instructions for the teaching of the Dharma. Huineng enumerates 36 basic oppositions of consciousness and explains how the Way is free from both extremes:

If one asks about the worldly, use the paired opposite of the saintly; if asking about the saintly use the paired opposite of the worldly. The mutual causation of the Way of dualities, gives birth to the meaning of the Middle Way. So, for a single question, a single pair of opposites, and for other questions the single [pair] that accords with this fashion, then you do not lose the principle. (Note: For example: "Suppose there is a person who asks, 'What is taken for and called darkness?' Reply and say, 'Light is the proximate cause and darkness is the contributory cause. When light is ended, then there is darkness. By the means of light, darkness manifests; by the means of darkness, light manifests. [Their] coming and going are mutually proximate causes and become the meaning of the Middle Way.)

== See also ==
- Golden mean (philosophy)
