= Jñānagarbha =

Buddhist philosopher

Jñānagarbha (Sanskrit: ज्ञानगर्भ, Tibetan: ཡེ་ཤེས་སྙིང་པོ་, Wyl. ye shes snying po) was an 8th-century Buddhist philosopher from Nalanda Monastery who is considered part of Bhāviveka's Svātantrika-Madhyamaka school. He was a student of Śrīgupta, who was in turn the student of Bhāviveka, and the teacher and ordaining master of Śāntarakṣita. Tibetan sources refer to him, Śāntarakṣita and Kamalaśīla as meaning "the three Svātantrika teachers from the East" (rang rgyud shar gsum) indicating their origins from Eastern India. The work he is most known for is "Distinguishing the Two Truths" (Skt. Satyadvayavibhaṅga). He is most well-known for the explanation found in this text of the two truths doctrine (satyadvaya).

== Biography ==
Little is known about the life of Jñānagarbha from Indian sources, but Tibetan historian Tāranātha places him in eastern India. According to Tāranātha, Jñānagarbha was born in Oḍiviśa, located roughly in modern-day Odisha, and studied with Śrīgupta in Bhaṃgala (modern-day Bengal). He reportedly became well-known for being "a great Mādhyamika follower of the views of Bhavya," or Bhāviveka, an influential 6th-century commentator on Nāgārjuna's Mūlamadhyamakakārikā. Jñānagarbha would largely follow Bhāviveka's Sautāntrika-Svātantrika Madhyamaka, while Śāntarakṣita and Kamalaśīla, the other two members of the "eastern trio" departed from it, giving rise to the subschool of Yogācāra-Svātantrika Madhyamaka.

Although he is attributed several others, Jñānagarbha is known for two main works, which are brief relative to other authors. The first is the Satyadvayavibhaṅgakārika, on which he wrote an auto-commentary (Vṛtti). The second work is a commentary that now only exists in Tibetan translation on the Anantamukhanirhāradhāraṇī-sūtra, a Mahayana text containing Tantric doctrine. This commentary is thought to be authored by Jñānagarbha in part because some of the verses from it are also found in his autocommentary on the Satyadvayavibhaṅga. Śāntarakṣita, Jñānagarbha's student, wrote a sub-commentary, known as Satyadvayavibhaṅgapañjikā, on the Satyadvayavibhaṅga.

A meditation text named "The Path for the Practice of Yoga" (Yoga-bhavana-marga or -patha), which discusses the Mādhyamika formulation of the steps of the path to awakening, is also attributed to him by Tibetan sources. Though it is hard to confirm this, Jñānagarbha also may have written a commentary to the Sandhinirmocana Sutra, a major sutra of the Yogacara school associated with figures like Asaṅga and Vasubandhu. For them, the sutra text grounds their understanding of key features of their doctrine such as definitive meaning (nītārtha) and interpretative meaning (neyārtha).

Some scholars think that there have been three people with the name of Jñānagarbha. The first was the author of the Satyadvayavibhaṅga and its autocommentary. The second, who lived during the early 9th century, translated Madhyamaka texts into Tibetan. The third lived during the 11th century, transmitting the Guhyasamājatantra to Marpa Lotsāwa. Other scholars disagree, arguing that there is only evidence for either one or two people with the name.

== Philosophy and works ==
Jñānagarbha incorporated aspects of Yogācāra philosophy and Dharmakīrti's epistemology and therefore can be seen as a harmonizer of the various Buddhist philosophical systems like his teacher Śrīgupta and his student Śāntarakṣita. He followed Bhāviveka's svatantrika interpretation of Madhyamaka philosophy. The svatantrika school, traced to Bhāviveka's critique of Buddhapālita's prasangika school, opted to use positive or independent inferential argumentation (anumāna) in arguing for Madhyamaka philosophy. The prasangika school based their method on Nāgārjuna's claim that he lacks a position of his own. They argued for the sole utilization of prasanga, or reductio ad absurdum, argumentation. Śāntarakṣita, who was Jñānagarbha's student, would remain part of the svatantrika school but departed from Jñānagarbha in forming a Yogācāra-Svātantrika Madhyamaka school. Jñānagarbha thus synthesized the realist Sautāntrika school with Madhyamaka, and his student synthesized it with the epistemological idealism of Yogācāra.

He is mostly known for his work "Distinguishing the Two Truths" (Skt. Satyadvayavibhaṅga, Wyl. bden gnyis rnam ‘byed). This work mostly sought to critique the views of Dharmapala of Nalanda and his followers. Jñānagarbha lamented that even though the Buddha and Nāgārjuna had already clarified the two truths, even Buddhists like Dharmapāla did not understand it correctly. Jñānagarbha points to Nāgārjuna's distinction between the two truths in the 24th chapter of his Mūlamadhyamakakārikā as the source of his discussion:

Relying upon two truths, buddhas teach the Dharma: the conventional truth of the world and the truth from the ultimate perspective. Those who do not understand the distinction between these two truths do not understand what is true in the buddhas’ profound teachings. The ultimate is not taught without depending on the conventional. Without understanding the ultimate, one will not attain nirvāṇa.

According to Jñānagarbha, correctly understanding this distinction is the key to becoming a buddha.

=== The two truths doctrine ===
Jñānagarbha's Satyadvayavibhaṅga analyzes the Madhyamaka two truths doctrine of conventional truth and ultimate truth. He defends the role of conceptual thinking and reasoning against those like Candrakīrti who would eliminate all conceptual thinking. However, like other Mādhyamikas, the goal of his project is a form of awareness which is free from all concepts, though one which, according to Jñānagarbha, is reachable through conceptual thought. Jñānagarbha held that even though language and reasoning is based on a cause and effect ontology which is ultimately empty and unreal, it can still lead towards the ultimate truth, through a logical analysis which realizes the untenable assumptions of reason and causality itself.

Jñānagarbha argues that the two truths can be understood using three criteria. The first criterion is that conventional reality is defined by that which appears to be real, and ultimate truth is the unreality of this: "That which corresponds to appearances is conventional [truth] whereas the other [i.e., ultimate truth] is its opposite."

The second criterion is that conventional truth is contradictory and deceptive. Ultimate truth is neither because it follows valid reasoning. Ultimate truth, Jñānagarbha writes, "is nondeceptive. Reason is an ultimate [truth], not a conventional [truth], because [conventional truth] deceives, it is real just as it appears."

Inferential reasoning is defined as fulfilling three criteria, based on Dharmakīrti's epistemological framework. First, the reason must qualify the subject of the inference (pakṣa-dharmatā). Second, the reason must only occur in similar instances (anvaya-vyāpti). And third, the reason must be completely absent from dissimilar instances (vyatireka-vyāpti).

The third criterion is that conventional truth cannot survive the analysis of reasoning. Ultimate truth does withstand such analysis. Jñānagarbha holds that there are two kinds of conventional truths, real (tathyasaṃvṛti) and unreal (mithyāsaṃvṛti). A commonplace example of this difference is that although real water and pseudo-water look similar, only one of them can quench one's thirst.

Though alike in the way in which it appears, conventional [truth] is subdivided into real and unreal conventionalities on the basis of their causal efficacy or inefficiency.

Drawing from his teacher Śrīgupta's synthesis of Dharmakīrti's epistemological framework with Madhyamaka metaphysics, Jñānagarbha argues that conventionally real things, or a "thing simpliciter" (vastumātra), are distinguished by their having a capacity for causal efficacy (arthakriyāsāmarthya). Under Dharmakīrti's original framework, this causal efficacy condition distinguished ultimately real things:

Whatever has the capacity for causal efficacy is ultimately real. [Whatever is] otherwise is conventionally real (Pramāṇavārttika 3.3)

For Śrīgupta and Jñānagarbha, the capacity for causal efficacy only distinguishes the conventionally real, not what is ultimately real. Before Jñānagarbha, the difference between real and unreal conventional things was based on general consensus. This was a view held by Candrakīrti in his Madhyamakāvatāra. Bhāviveka did not clearly distinguish between two kinds of conventional things, though he did think that there can be conventionally false things like a creator God (Īśvara), which he argued, in Prajñāpradīpa, could not even be conventionally true. Jñānagarbha argued that the condition of causal efficacy includes the general consensus condition. Whether or not a thing has causal efficacy is determined by what is commonly affirmed in the world.

In all, Jñānagarbha argues that there are four criteria of real conventional truths. They cannot either be conceptually imagined or analyzable, and they must be dependently arisen and causally effective. Conceptually imagined things (kalpitārtha) include primal matter affirmed by the Samkhya tradition and the consciousness of the Yogācāra tradition. Being dependently arisen means arising based on a set of causes and conditions. Being unanalyzable means that it cannot bear critical analysis. Critical analysis refers to the asking of metaphysical questions like are many effects produced by many causes or are many effects produced by one cause.

=== Reason ===
Jñānagarbha defines ultimate truth in terms of reason (nyāya), and conventional truth in terms of perception. He reverses Dharmakīrti's epistemological framework, which ties perception with ultimate truth and inferential reasoning with conventional truth. Dan Arnold argues that this is a common Madhyamaka reaction to the Buddhist epistemological school's foundationalist epistemology. Jñānagarbha's positioning of reasoning in this way seems to conflict with the Buddhist assumption that Dharma is inaccessible through reason (atarkāvacāra). Jñānagarbha addresses this problem by making a distinction between two kinds of ultimate truths, that which can be expressed using words and that which cannot. Jñānagarbha classifies the first kind of ultimate truth as the "negation of arising." According to Malcolm David Eckel, Jñānagarbha's view is that the ultimate truth can be understood as rational cognition from a relative stance, but it is not an object of cognition from an ultimate stance.

=== Causation ===
In his Satyadvayavibhaṅga, Jñānagarbha offers a detailed critique against Dharmakīrti's theory of causation. He argues that "there can be no causal relationship, because many do not produce one, many do not produce many, one does not produce many, and one does not produce one." Jñānagarbha rejects Dharmakīrti's and his follower Devendrabuddhi's theory of causation that is based on his theory of apoha, which argues that many causes produce many distinct effects and that one cause produces many effects.

=== Karma ===
Jñānagarbha argues that although karma lacks the status of ultimate truth, it still functions as a conventionally real appearance: "[The Buddha] teaches actions and results just as they appear to him as he sees them. This is why all [actions and results] correspond to appearances."

== See also ==
- Two truths doctrine
- Dharmakirti
- Nagarjuna
- Bhāviveka
- Śāntarakṣita
