= Malcolm David Eckel =

Malcolm David Eckel is an American scholar of religion and Buddhist studies. He is Professor Emeritus of Religion at Boston University where he served on the faculty for more than three decades and held several senior administrative and leadership positions. His scholarship focuses on Indian and Tibetan Buddhist Philosophy, particularly Madhyamaka thought, Buddhist narrative traditions, and the relationship between philosophical theory and religious practice, as well as Buddhist–Christian dialogue.

== Early life and education ==
Eckel received his B.A. in English from Harvard University and subsequently earned a B.A. and M.A. in Theology from the University of Oxford, with specialization in classical Hebrew composition. He completed his Ph.D. in the Study of Religion at Harvard University in 1980. His doctoral dissertation, “A Question of Nihilism: Bhāviveka’s Response to the Fundamental Problems of Madhyamika Philosophy,” examined foundational debates in Buddhist philosophy.

== Academic career ==
Eckel began his academic career as an Instructor in Religion at Middlebury College from 1978 to 1980 before joining Harvard Divinity School, where he served as Assistant Professor from 1980 to 1985, Associate Professor from 1985 to 1989, and Senior Lecturer in the History of Religions from 1989 to 1991. During this period, he also held administrative appointments at Harvard’s Center for the Study of World Religions, including Administrative Director.

In 1990, Eckel joined Boston University, where he served as Associate Professor of Religion from 1990 to 2009 and later Professor of Religion from 2009 to 2024. He was named Distinguished Teaching Professor of the Humanities from 2002 to 2005 and received the university’s Metcalf Award for Teaching Excellence in 1998. He was appointed Professor Emeritus in 2024. At Boston University, Eckel played a central role in academic administration. He served as Director of the Institute for Philosophy and Religion (2003–2008, 2014–2022) and as Assistant Dean and Director of the Core Curriculum (2007–2013), overseeing an interdisciplinary liberal arts program for first- and second-year students. Earlier administrative roles included Associate Director and Acting Director of the Division of Religious and Theological Studies.

Eckel also held a visiting appointment as Visiting Associate Professor of Buddhist Studies at the University of Michigan in 1987 and served as Visiting Professor of Buddhist Studies at the University of Sydney in 2013.

== Scholarships and research ==
His publications include Bhāviveka and His Buddhist Opponents (Harvard); Buddhism: Origins, Beliefs, Practices, Holy Texts, Sacred Places (Oxford); To See the Buddha: A Philosopher's Quest for the Meaning of Emptiness (Princeton); Jnanagarbha's Commentary on the Distinction Between the Two Truths: An Eighth-Century Handbook of Madhyamaka Philosophy (State University of New York); and "Is There a Buddhist Philosophy of Nature?" in Theoretical and Methodological Issues in Buddhism and Ecology (Harvard Center for the Study of World Religions). He is the editor of two volumes of essays: India and The West: The Problem of Understanding (Harvard Center for the Study of World Religions) and Deliver Us from Evil (Continuum). He is the author of several other influential monographs, including Bhaviveka and His Buddhist Opponents (2008) and Understanding Buddhism (2002). His later work includes Dignāga’s Investigation of the Percept: A Philosophical Legacy in India and Tibet (2016), co-authored with an international team of scholars. Eckel has also edited major essay collections in philosophy of religion and comparative religious studies and has contributed extensively to leading academic journals, edited volumes, and reference works, including Brill’s Encyclopedia of Buddhism and The Harper’s Dictionary of Religion.

Eckel leads educational journeys to India and the Himalayan Kingdoms.

Eckel’s research addresses the history of Buddhist philosophy in India and Tibet, with particular emphasis on figures such as Bhāviveka and Jñānagarbha, Madhyamaka theories of language and truth, and Buddhist approaches to ethics, narrative, death, and ultimate reality. His work has also contributed to comparative philosophy and Buddhist–Christian dialogue, as well as studies of Buddhism’s adaptation in Asia and the modern West.

== Selected bibliography ==
=== Books ===
- Duckworth, Douglas; Eckel, M.D (2016-11-03). Dignaga's Investigation of the Percept: A Philosophical Legacy in India and Tibet. Oxford University Press. ISBN 978-0-19-062371-5.
- Eckel, M.D; Eckel, Malcolm David (2008). Bhāviveka and His Buddhist Opponents. Department of Sanskrit and Indian Studies, Harvard University. ISBN 978-0-674-03274-3.
- Eckel, M.D (2003). Understanding Buddhism: Origins, Beliefs, Practices, Holy Texts, Sacred Places. Duncan Baird. ISBN 978-1-84483-202-6.<
- Eckel, M.D (1994-12-19). To See the Buddha: A Philosopher's Quest for the Meaning of Emptiness. Princeton University Press. ISBN 978-0-691-03773-8.
- Eckel, M.D (1992-01-01). Jñānagarbha on the Two Truths: An Eighth Century Handbook of Madhyamaka Philosophy. Motilal Banarsidass Publishing House. ISBN 978-81-208-0778-5.

=== Edited volumes ===
- Eckel, M.D; Speight, C. Allen; DuJardin, Troy, eds. (2021). The future of the philosophy of religion. Boston studies in philosophy, religion and public life. Cham: Springer. ISBN 978-3-030-44605-5.
- Eckel, M.D; Herling, Bradley L. (2008). Deliver us from evil. Boston university studies in philosophy and religion. London: Continuum. ISBN 978-0-8264-9967-7.
- Mehta, Jaswant Lal (1985). Eckel, M.D (ed.). India and the West, the Problem of Understanding: Selected Essays. Scholars Press. ISBN 978-0-89130-826-3.

=== Reference works and encyclopedia entries ===
- Eckel, M.D (2013-01-28), "Bhāviveka / Bhāvaviveka", Buddhism, Oxford University Press, ISBN 978-0-19-539352-1
- Eckel, M.D. "Jñānagarbha". Brill's Encyclopedia of Buddhism Online.
- Eckel, M.D. "Bhāviveka". Oxford bibliographies in Buddhism.

=== Selected journal articles and book chapters ===
- ECKEL, Malcolm David (2019-06-30). "Who or What Created the World? Bhāviveka's Arguments Against the Hindu Concept of Īśvara". International Journal of Buddhist Thought and Culture. 29 (1): 29–51. doi:10.16893/ijbtc.2019.06.29.1.29. ISSN 1598-7914.
- Eckel, M.D (2015-04-01), ""Undigested Pride"", Madhyamaka and Yogācāra, Oxford University Press, pp. 127–137
- Eckel, M.D (2003). "The satisfaction of no analysis: On Tsong kha pa's approach to Svātantrika Madhyamaka". In Dreyfus, G. B. J.; McClintock, S. L. (eds.). The Svātantrika–Prāsaṅgika distinction. Wisdom Publication.
- Eckel, M.D (1994). "The Ghost at the Table: On the Study of Buddhism and the Study of Religion". Journal of the American Academy of Religion. LXII (4): 1085–1110. doi:10.1093/jaarel/lxii.4.1085. ISSN 0002-7189.
- Eckel, M.D (1998), "Is There a Buddhist Philosophy of Nature?", in Cohen, Robert S.; Tauber, Alfred I. (eds.), Philosophies of Nature: The Human Dimension: In Celebration of Erazim Kohák, Dordrecht: Springer Netherlands, pp. 53–69, doi:10.1007/978-94-017-2614-6_5, ISBN 978-94-017-2614-6
- Eckel, M.D (2019-06-30). "Who or What Created the World? Bhāviveka's Arguments Against the Hindu Concept of Īśvara". International Journal of Buddhist Thought and Culture. 29 (1): 29–51. doi:10.16893/ijbtc.2019.06.29.1.29. ISSN 1598-7914.
- ECKEL, M. DAVID (1987). "BHĀVAVIVEKA'S VISION OF REALITY: STRUCTURE AND METAPHOR IN A BUDDHIST PHILOSOPHICAL SYSTEM". Journal of the American Academy of Religion. LV (1): 39–56. doi:10.1093/jaarel/lv.1.39. ISSN 0002-7189.
