= Buddhapālita =

5th/6th century Indian Buddhist philosopher

Buddhapālita (Chinese: 佛護; Tibetan: སངས་རྒྱས་བསྐྱངས་, Wylie: sangs rgyas bskyangs, fl. 5th-6th centuries CE) was an Indian Mahayana Buddhist commentator on the works of Nagarjuna and Aryadeva. His Mūlamadhyamaka-vṛtti is an influential commentary to the Mūlamadhyamakakarikā.

Buddhapālita's commentarial approach works was criticised by his contemporary Bhāviveka, and then defended by the later Candrakīrti (c. 600–650).

Later Tibetan scholasticism (11th century onwards) would characterize the two approaches as the prasaṅgika (Buddhapālita-Candrakīrti) and svatantrika (Bhāviveka's) schools of Madhyamaka philosophy (but these terms do not appear in Indian Sanskrit sources).

== Overview ==
Little is known about Buddhapālita's life. According to some sources, he is believed to have been born in South India.

Buddhapālita's only work that survives is his Buddhapālita-Mūlamadhyamakavṛtti, a commentary on Nagarjuna's Mūlamadhyamakakarikā (MMK). The commentary survives in Tibetan (not in the original Sanskrit) and contains 27 chapters and divided into ten sections. The Tibetan translation was completed by Jñānagarbha and Klu'i rgyal mtshan in the beginning of the 9th century. According to Taranatha and to the colophon to Buddhapālita's commentary, Buddhapālita composed various other commentaries, but they have not survived.

The Buddhapālita-Mūlamadhyamakavṛtti (Tibetan: dbu ma rtsa ba'i 'grel pa buddhapalita) is closely related to the earlier commentary on Nagarjuna's MMK called the Akutobhayā. Indeed, in various places (particularly the last five chapters), the Tibetan texts are very similar or identical and about a third of Buddhapālita's commentary comes from the Akutobhayā. In this text, Buddhapālita also sometimes quotes Aryadeva.

As noted by Jan Westerhoff, Buddhapālita's method exclusively relies on the prasaṅgavākya (reductio ad absurdum, literally "consequentialist") philosophical method. This method relies on drawing out the necessary but undesired consequences of an opponent's thesis without maintaining any counter thesis or proposition to be established in turn.

As David Seyfort Ruegg explains:

Buddhapālita represents a conservative current in Madhyamaka thought that resisted the adoption of the logico-epistemological innovations which were at the time being brought into Mahāyānist philosophy (e. g. by Dignāga, c. 480—540). Thus he did not make use of independent inferences to establish the Madhyamika’s statements; and he employed the well-established prasanga method, which points out the necessary but undesired consequence resulting from a thesis or proposition intended to prove something concerning an entity. From the Mādhyamika’s standpoint this method has the advantage of not committing the critic who uses the prasanga to taking up a counter-position and maintaining the contradictory of what he has denied, which as a Mādhyamika he would consider to be just as faulty as the position he has negating. Buddhapālita’s procedure appears accordingly to be in keeping with Nāgārjuna’s as expressed in the MMK and the Vigrahavyavartani.

Similarly, according to Saito, the "fundamental rule of inference" which Buddhapalita uses in his commentary is the reductio ad absurdum based on Modus tollens.

Buddhapālita's main philosophical methodological approach consisted of his explaining the philosophy of Nāgārjuna by the method of prasaṅgavākya (reductio ad absurdum ). That is, without himself maintaining any thesis or proposition to be established, he tried to point out the necessary but undesired consequences resulting from a non-Madhyamaka opponent's thesis.

Another Madhyamaka thinker, Bhāviveka, criticized Buddhapālita's method of commentary, for not making use of logical autonomous inferences (svatantranumana; Wylie: rang rgyud rjes dpag) in developing Madhyamaka arguments. A later commentator, Candrakīrti (7th century CE), wrote the Clear Words (Prasannapadā) commentary to the MMK based on Buddhapalita's work. Candrakīrti defends Buddhapalita's method and refutes Bhāviveka's assertion of autonomous syllogisms.

Due to this debate, Tibetans name Bhāviveka as the first svātantrika (a modern back-translation from the Tibetan term Rang rgyud pa) distinguishing his Madhyamaka system from prasangika (Tibetan: Thal 'gyur ba), the system of Candrakīrti and Buddhapalita. However, these classifications of Madhyamaka philosophy do not exist in Indian sources and were invented by Tibetan scholars.

== Sources ==
- Ruegg, David S. (1981) The Literature of the Madhyamaka School of Philosophy in India. Otto Harrassowitz; Wiesbaden.
- Saito, A. (1984) A Study of the Buddhapālita-Mūlamadhyamakavṛtti. Ph.D. diss.; Australian National University.
- Ian James Coghlan (2021) Buddhapalita's Commentary on Nagarjuna's Middle Way: Buddhapalita-Mulamadhyamaka-Vrtti (Treasury of the Buddhist Sciences); Wisdom Publications.
