= Bhāviveka =

Indian Buddhist philosopher (c.500–c.578)

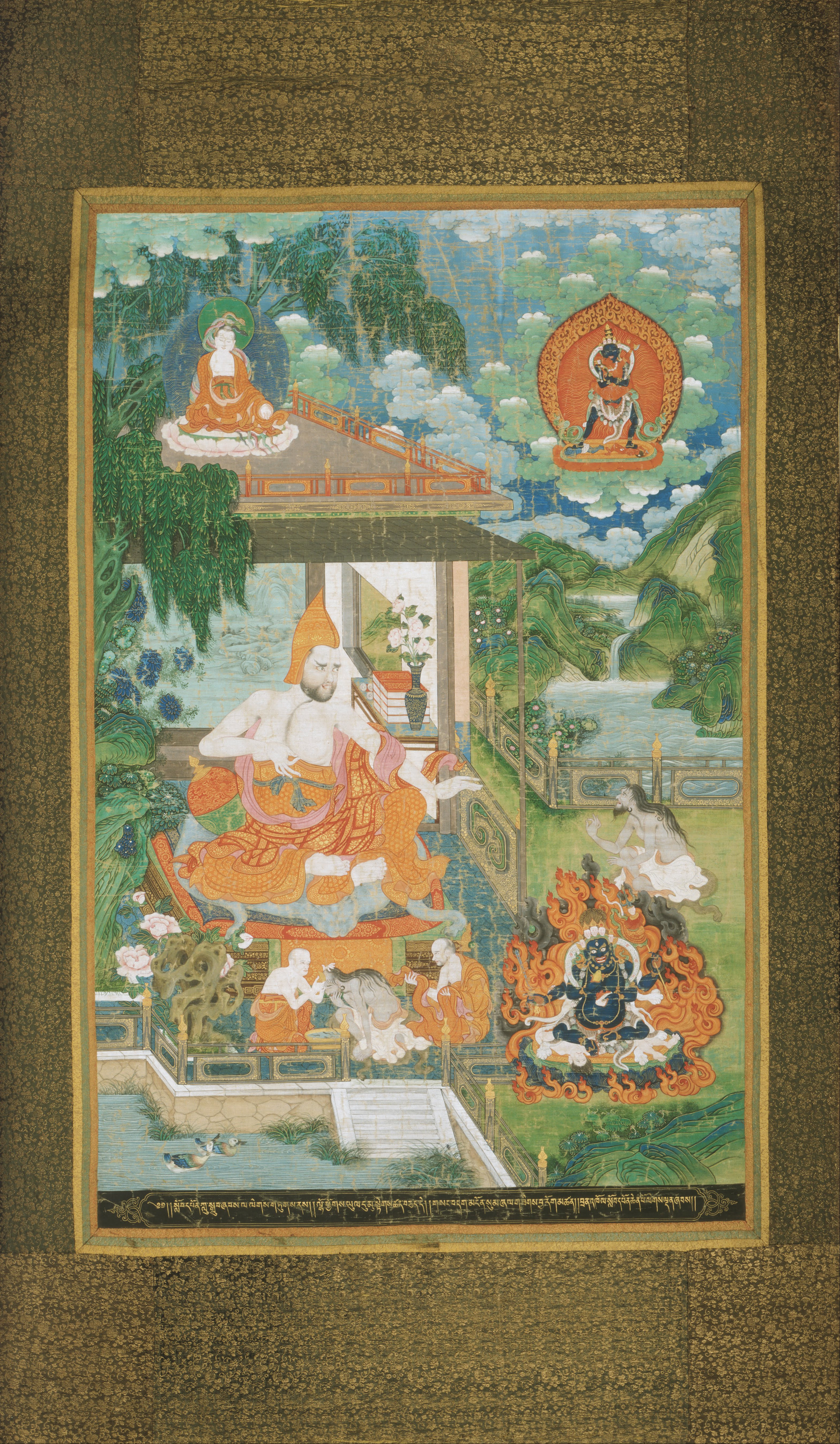
Ācārya Bhāviveka Converts a Nonbeliever to Buddhism, Gelug 18th-century Qing painting in the Philadelphia Museum of Art

Bhāviveka, also called Bhāvaviveka (traditional Chinese: 清辯; ; pinyin: Qīngbiàn; Wylie: slob dpon bha bya, skal ldan, legs ldan), and Bhavya was a sixth-century (c. 500 – c. 570) madhyamaka Buddhist philosopher. Alternative names for this figure also include Bhavyaviveka, Bhāvin, Bhāviviveka, Bhagavadviveka and Bhavya. Bhāviveka is the author of the Madhyamakahrdaya (Heart of the Middle), its auto-commentary the Tarkajvālā (Blaze of Reasoning) and the Prajñāpradīpa (Lamp for Wisdom).

In Tibetan Buddhism Bhāviveka is regarded as the founder of the svātantrika tradition of mādhyamaka, as opposed to the prāsaṅgika madhyamaka of Chandrakirti.

There is also another later author called Bhāvaviveka who wrote another set of madhyamaka texts. He is sometimes called Bhāvaviveka II by modern scholars.

== Background ==
India in the late 6th century

The life details of Bhāviveka are unclear. The earliest source is Xuanzang's 7th century The Great Tang Dynasty Record of the Western Regions. According to Xuanzang, Bhāviveka was a 6th-century scholar from south India (Andhra Pradesh) who traveled north in an attempt to engage in debate with the Yogacara master Dharmapāla (who refused to meet him). Malcolm Eckel states that the sixth century was a period of "unusual creativity and ferment in the history of Indian Buddhist philosophy", when the Mahayana Buddhism movement was emerging as a "vigorous and self-conscious intellectual force" while early Buddhist traditions from the eighteen (Nikaya) schools opposed this Mahayana movement.

Eckel states that Bhāviveka may have been one of the many itinerant scholars at the time who traveled the country engaging their opponents in debate. During this time, formal debate was a high stakes endeavor which played a central role in Indian monastic life and could determine the support monasteries received from kings who attended the debates. In some cases, one was not even allowed to enter an elite institution like Nālānda unless one demonstrated a certain amount of knowledge to the gatekeeper scholar. Because of this, an effective debater like Bhāviveka needed to be conversant with the doctrines of their opponents, and this need is reflected in the writing of doxographical works like Bhāviveka's.

According to Olle Qvarnström, Bhavya developed and revised some of the methods and ideas of the Mādhyamaka philosophy first established by Nāgārjuna. Qvarnström argues that the need for this revision was that Madhyamaka was in danger of "being absorbed or overshadowed by the Yogacara school" and was also coming under pressure from various Brahmanical systems of philosophy. Qvarnström writes that "in order to avert these threats and to bring Madhyamaka philosophy into conformity with the prevalent philosophical requirements of the intellectual milieu in the sixth century, Bhavya used logical devices originally formulated by Dignaga and others."

== Philosophy ==
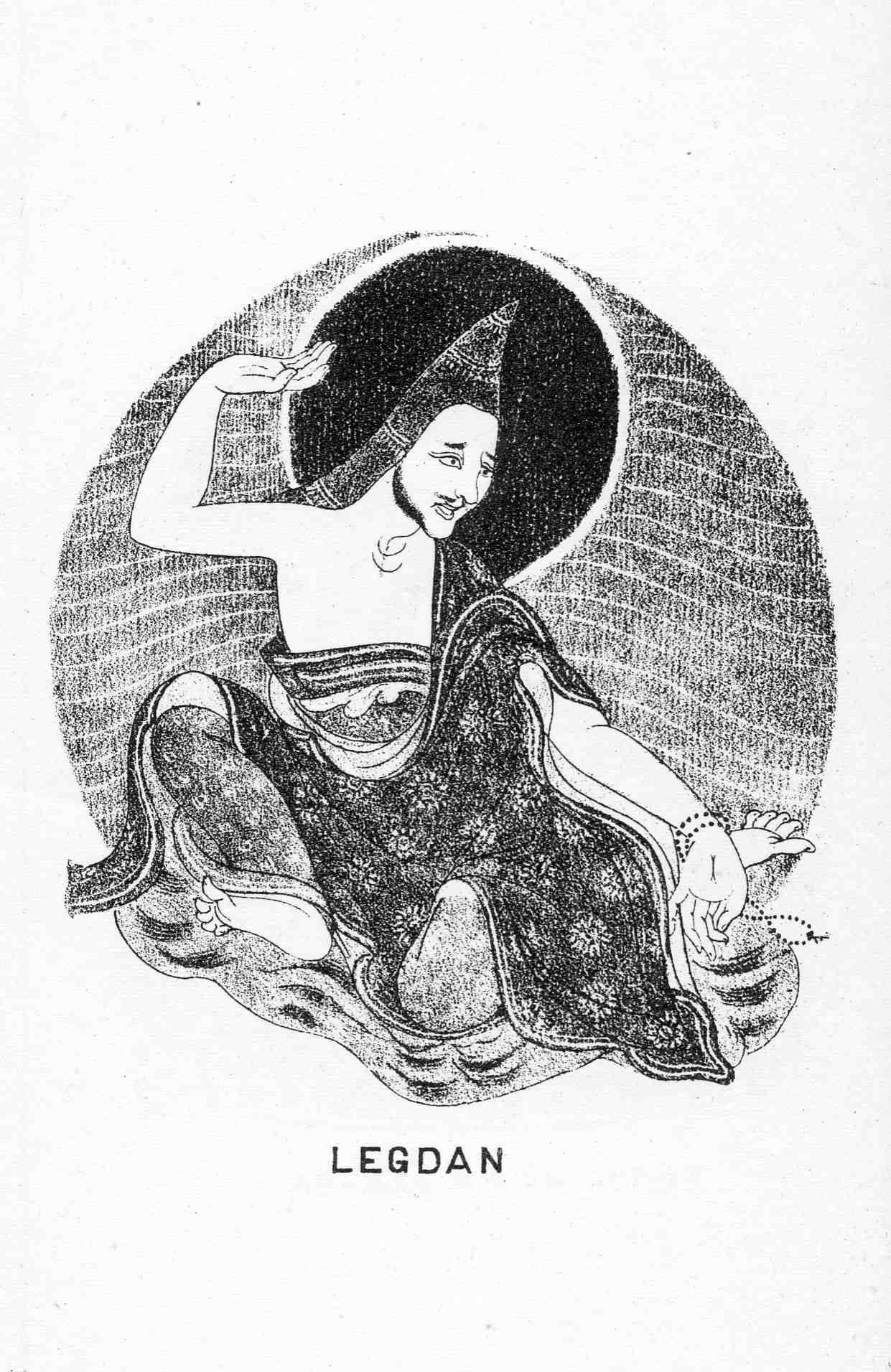
Tibetan illustration of Bhāviveka

=== Mādhyamaka and Pramāṇa ===
Unlike previous mādhyamaka authors, Bhāviveka adopted Indian pramāṇa reasoning (as developed by the earlier Buddhist logician Dignaga) and applied it to the development of madhyamaka arguments in order to show that phenomena (dharmas) have no self-nature (svabhāva), and to establish that the true nature of all phenomena is emptiness. According to Ames (1993: p. 210), Bhāviveka was one of the first Buddhist logicians to employ the "formal syllogism" (Wylie: sbyor ba'i tshig, Sanskrit: prayogavākya) of Indian logic in expounding mādhyamaka. He employed these to considerable effect in his commentary to Nāgārjuna's Mūlamadhyamakakārikā, entitled the Wisdom Lamp.

Qvarnström outlines Bhāviveka's development of madhyamaka as follows:

According to Bhavya, the refutation of a system by depicting its inherent contradictions without stating a positive thesis of one's own was not sufficient to settle a debate. This "reductio ad absurdum" (prāsaṇgika) argumentation had to be supplemented by independent propositions (svatantra), sometimes incorporated in formal syllogisms (prayogavākya). By means of independent inferences (svatantrānumāna) and proper syllogisms, Bhavya considered himself capable of both proving the validity of his own propositions and of refuting any upcoming counterposition, Buddhist or Hindu.

Bhāviveka held that even though Nagarjuna himself had only relied on prāsaṇgika style reductios which do not put forth any positive thesis (and only refutes the arguments of the opponent), it was the responsibility of the commentator to make explicit the implications and logical consequences of Nagarjuna's text. This was to be done by making use of pramāṇa reasoning in order to establish logical arguments that proved the truth of mādhyamaka in a positive sense. That is to say, Bhavya sought to prove madhyamaka by arguing for the truth of independent theses (pratijñā) which did not rely on refuting the theses of others.

Because of this, he criticized Buddhapalita, an earlier commentator on Nagarjuna, for failing to properly draw out these implications and construct proper syllogistic arguments to prove the truth of Madhyamaka. As Richard Hayes notes, Bhavya took pains to show that "Mādhyamikas do have a conviction that they are prepared to state and defend, namely, that all phenomena are devoid of an inherent nature, that is, a nature that they have independently." Hence, Bhavya held that mādhyamaka philosophers needed to provide proper arguments in favor of the basic mādhyamaka theory which states that all phenomena (dharmas) are empty (śūnya).

Eckel illustrates the differences in method between Bhavya and Buddhapalita as follows:

The first substantive verse of Nagarjuna's MMK says: "Nothing arises from itself, from something else, from both, or from no cause at all." Buddhapalita explains the first part of this verse as follows: "Nothing arises from itself, because its arising would be useless, and because it would lead to an absurd conclusion. There would be no point for things that already exist in their own right to arise again, and, if something arises after it already exists, it would never cease to arise." Bhaviveka reformulates this argument as a positive assertion: "The internal sense media ultimately do not arise from themselves, because they already exist, like consciousness." By making this logical transformation, Bhaviveka takes an argument that reduces the opponent's assertion to an absurd conclusion (prasaṇga) and substitutes an independent (svatantra) inference, with a proper thesis (pratijñā), reason (hetu), and example (dṛṣṭānta).

Regarding the fact that Nagarjuna himself states that he does not defend any thesis in his The Avoidance of Refutations (Vigrahavyāvartanī), Bhavya makes use of the doctrine of two truths to defend his method. Though he agrees that ultimately there can be no thesis, it is still possible to use words in a conventional manner to convince others through reasoning as a "skillful means" (upāya). Eckel notes that his defense of positive syllogisms may have been motivated by its importance in the sixth century Indian circles of formal debate. In these circles, the practice of merely attacking the views of one's opponent without defending a thesis of one's own (which was called vitaṇḍā) was seen as bad form and not well respected.

=== The Importance of Reasoning ===
Regarding the importance and use of reason on the Buddhist path, Bhāviveka agrees with some of his Buddhist opponents that reasoning cannot know true reality. However, according to Bhāviveka, reason (tarka) does have a role in the Buddhist path and that is the removal of wrong and confused views about reality which block one's spiritual progress. Bhāviveka affirms that "Buddhas use faultless inference in a way that is consistent with tradition to completely reject many different concepts of imagined things" and "inference rules out the opposite of knowledge." For Bhāviveka, it is after reasoned inference has cleared away all the confusing wrong views (kudṛṣṭi) and conflicting doctrines (vāda) that a person is able to "see all objects of knowledge just as they are, with non-conceptual knowledge and with minds like space."

Furthermore, inference allows one to examine all the differences which are found among the various spiritual traditions and philosophies (darśana), and then to be able to determine which is true in a rational manner. This is because "if tradition has the status of tradition because it has an unbroken transmission, then everything is tradition, and it is necessary to determine which is true."

Thus Bhavya sees reasoning about spiritual and philosophical matters as an key preliminary step which prepares the mind to develop a pure and non-conceptual type of wisdom (prajñā) that sees ultimate truth. In chapter three of the Verses on the Heart of the Middle Way, Bhavya states:

- 3.10-11. Ultimate wisdom negates the entire network of concepts, and it moves without moving into the clear sky of reality, which is peaceful, directly known, non-conceptual, non-verbal, and free from unity and diversity.
- 3.12-13. Surely it is impossible to climb to the top of the palace of reality without the steps of correct relative [truth] . For that reason, one should first discriminate according to relative truth, then one should analyze the particular and universal characteristics of things.

=== Doxography and Indian philosophy ===
Because wisdom requires the clearing away of wrong views, there is a need to understand these views and thus an important part of Bhāviveka's philosophical project was a schematic theory of erroneous views. Bhāviveka does this in various ways, one of which is based on the early Buddhist Brahmajāla Sūtra which outlines 62 types of wrong views and he also provides another even longer list of 363 wrong views which is found in the Tarkajvālā.

Bhavya also explored the various Indian philosophical schools (darśanas) in depth. Bhavya is notable in the Indian tradition for his work on comparative philosophy and doxography. According to Malcolm D. Eckel, "no Indian Mahayana thinker played a more crucial role in mapping the landscape of Indian philosophy and defining the relationships of its different traditions. At a time when major branches of Indian philosophy were still in the process of formation, Bhaviveka provided a model of textual classification (the philosophical compendium or doxography) that became the classic vehicle for the study of Indian philosophy." Bhavya's work discusses most of the major schools of Indian philosophy (Vaiśeṣika, Sāṃkhya, Vedānta, Mīṃāṃsā as well as Jainism).

Bhaviveka also engages with the doctrines of Śrāvakayāna (non-Mahayana) Buddhists and addresses their various criticisms against Mahayana.

According to Qvarnström, Bhavya's Madhyamakahrdayakārikā and its Tarkajvālā commentary is one of the earliest sources on early (pre-Shankara) Vedanta (aside from the Brahmasūtra, the Vākyapadīya and the Gaudapādīyakārikā). Regarding Bhavya's view of Vedanta, Qvarnström writes:

the Vedāntatattvaviniścaya of the Madhyamakahrdayakārikā and Tarkajvālā is interesting because it is the first Buddhist text to distinguish Madhyamaka philosophy from purely Vedanta notions. In VTV, Bhavya maintains that the notion of a "Self'- or in his terminology, an "intrinsic nature" - actually was borrowed from the Madhyamaka school. Bhavya consequently considers it his duty not only to refute the Vedanta interpretation of this notion, but also to outline his own view on this matter at great length. The question of "intrinsic nature" or "Self' constitutes, therefore, the main object of the polemics between the Vedāntavādins and the Mādhyamikas in VTV. Bhavya may thus be said to have initiated on a systematical basis the main issue of the prolonged controversies between Buddhist and Brahmanical philosophy which were to continue well beyond his time.

== Works ==
=== Heart of the Middle and Blaze of Reasoning ===
Bhāviveka wrote an independent work on the Madhyamaka entitled the Madhyamakahrdayakārikā (MHK, Verses on the Heart of the Middle Way) which Bhavya in turn wrote an autocommentary upon entitled the Tarkajvālā (Blaze of Reasoning). Bhāviveka's Madhyamakahrdayakārikā and his commentary Tarkajvālā therein, states (Malcolm) David Eckel, provide a "unique and authoritative account of the intellectual differences that stirred the Buddhist community in this creative period". However, the Blaze of Reasoning also contains different layers, and it seems like at least parts of it where also authored by a later figure, possibly Bhāvaviveka II.

The text survives in an incomplete Sanskrit manuscript as well in Tibetan translation by Atiśa and Lotsawa Jayaśīla (which has allowed for a reconstruction of the full Sanskrit).

According to Qvarnström, this text outlines the main views found in the Buddhist Śrāvakayāna and Yogācāra schools as well as the Brahmanical Vaiśeṣika, Sāṃkhya, Vedānta and Mīṃāṃsā schools. All these schools are presented as the pūrvapaksa (opponent's view). Their views are critiqued and the Madhymaka view is then outlined as the uttarapakṣa (superior view).

The Madhyamakahrdayakārikā is divided into the following chapters:

1. Not Giving Up the Mind of Awakening (bodhicittāparityāga)
2. Taking the Vow of an Ascetic (munivratasamāśraya)
3. Seeking the Knowledge of Reality (tattvajñānaiṣaṇā)
4. Introduction to the Analysis of Reality According to the Sravakas (śrāvakatattvaviniścayāvatāra)
5. Introduction to the Analysis of Reality According to the Yogacaras (yogācāratattvaviniścayāvatāra)
6. Introduction to Reality According to the Sāṃkhyas (sāṃkhyatattvāvatāra)
7. Analysis of Reality According to the Vaiśeṣika (vaiśeṣikatattvaviniścaya)
8. Analysis of Reality According to the Vedanta (vedāntatattvaviniścaya)
9. Introduction to the Analysis of Reality According to the Mīmāṃsā (mīmāṃsātattvanirṇayāvatāra).
10. Exposition of the Realization of Omniscience (sarvajñatātsiddhinirdeśa), this chapter discusses Jain views
11. Exposition of Praise and Characteristics (stutilakṣaṇanirdeśa).

The first three chapters present Bhavya's own Madhyamaka philosophy and understanding of Buddhism, the rest discuss and refute other views.

=== Wisdom Lamp ===
The Prajñāpradīpa (Wylie: shes rab sgron ma; or shes rab sgron me) is Bhāviveka's commentary upon Nagarjuna's Mūlamadhyamakakārikā. The Sanskrit is no longer extant (except for a few embedded quotations in the Prasannapadā, Candrakīrti's commentary of the Mūlamadhyamakakārikā and critique of the Prajñāpradīpa) but according to Ames (1993: p. 211) is available in both an excellent Tibetan translation, rendered by Jñānagarbha and Cog ro Klu'i rgyal mtshan (Wylie) in the early 9th century. Ames (1993: p. 211) also conveyed that the Chinese translation is poor, where the inference of inferiority was drawn from the work of Kajiyama (1963: p. 39). The Sanskrit name has been reconstructed as either *Prajñāpradīpa or *Janāndeepa (where Janāndeepa may or may not be a Prakrit corruption or a poor inverse-translation, for example).

== Bhāvaviveka II ==
There is also later figure by the same name, sometimes called Bhāvaviveka II or Bhavya. According to Ruegg, this second Bhāvaviveka may have been the same person as the tantric Bhavyakīrti (c. 1000) and is the author of the Madhyamakārthasaṃgraha (Compendium of Meanings of the Middle) and the Madhyamakaratnapradīpa (Jewel Lamp of the Middle).

== In Tibetan Buddhism ==
Bhāviveka is retrospectively considered by the Tibetan Buddhist tradition to be the founder of the svātantrika madhyamaka tradition within Buddhism. Tibetan doxographers divided the madhyamaka philosophy of Nāgārjuna into svātantrika (those who make use of svatantra: autonomous syllogisms) and prāsaṅgika, which refers to those madhyamikas who only use prasaṅga (consequential, reductio ad absurdum) arguments, mainly Buddhapalita (470–550 CE) and Candrakirti (600–650 CE). This manner of division has been retroactively applied in Tibetan monasteries, and commonly found in modern secondary literature on madhyamaka.

However, according to Dreyfus and McClintock, such a classification is problematic and was not used in India, where instead the "svātantrika and prasangika" schools were camped together then contrasted with Santaraksita and Kamalasila" (Yogacara-Madhyamaka) schools. The former accepted "external objects exist", while the latter camp accepted "external objects do not exist". The svātantrika versus prāsaṅgika sub-schools may have been an 11th–12th century innovation of the Tibetan translator Patsab Nyima Drakpa while he was translating a Sanskrit text by Candrakirti into Tibetan.

=== Panchen Lama lineage ===
In the lineage of the Panchen Lamas of Tibet there were four Indian and three Tibetan mindstream tulku of Amitābha before Khedrup Gelek Pelzang, 1st Panchen Lama. The lineage starts with Subhuti, one of the original disciples of Gautama Buddha. Bhāviveka is considered to be the third Indian tulku in this line.

== See also ==
- Buddhapālita

== Sources ==
=== Primary Sources in Translation ===
- V. V. Gokhale; S. S. Bahulkar. “Madhyamakahrdayakārikā Tarkajvālā: Chapter I.” In Miscellanea Buddhica: 76–107. Edited by Chr. Lindtner. Indiske Studier 5. Copenhagen: Akademisk Forlag, 1985.
- V. V. Gokhale. “The Second Chapter of Bhavya’s Madhyamakahrdayakārikā (Taking the Vow of an Ascetic).” IIJ 14 (1972): 40–45.
- Shotaro Iida. Reason and Emptiness: A Study in Logic and Mysticism. Tokyo: The Hokuseido Press, 1980. This contains Chapter 3 of Madhyamakahrdayakārikā, verses 1–136 with commentary.
- Chikafumi Watanabe. “A Translation of the Madhyamakahrdayakārikā with the Tarkajvālā III.137-146.” JIABS 21 (1998): 125–55.
- Eckel, Malcolm D. To See the Buddha: A Philosopher’s Quest for the Meaning of Emptiness (1992). San Francisco: Harper San Francisco. Reprint ed. Princeton: Princeton University Press, 1994. This contains a translation of Madhyamakahrdayakārikā Chapter 3, verses 266–360, with commentary.
- Eckel, Malcolm David. (2008). Bhāviveka and his Buddhist Opponents. Cambridge: Harvard University Press. Harvard Oriental Series, Vol. 70, ISBN 9780674032734. This contains a translation of chapters 4 and 5.
- A series of articles by Paul Hoornaert contain the Sanskrit text of the verses of chapter 5 and Tibetan text of the commentary with translation. These were published in Studies and Essays, Behavioral Sciences and Philosophy, Faculty of Letters, Kanazawa University (19 to 23, 1999 - 2003).
- Qvarnström, Olle (1989). Hindu philosophy in Buddhist perspective: the Vedāndatattvaviniścaya chapter of Bhavya's Madhyamakahṛdayakārikā. Lund: Plus Ultra. Lund Studies in African and Asian Religions, Vol. 4. ISBN 91 86668 30 7.
- Qvarnström, Olle (2015). Bhavya on Samkhya and Vedanta: The Sāṃkhyatattvāvatāra and Vedāndatattvaviniścaya Chapters of the Madhyamakahṛdayakārikā and Tarkajvālā. Harvard Department of South Asian Studies.
- Lindtner, Christian. Bhavya on Mīmāṃsā: Mīmāṃsātattvāvatāra. Chennai: Adyar Library and Research Centre, 2001.
- Ames, William Longstreet (1986). Bhāvaviveka's Prajnāpradīpa: six chapters. Contains chapters three, four, five, seventeen, twenty-three, and twenty-six.

=== Secondary Sources ===
- Georges B.J. Dreyfus & L. Sara McClintock (2015), Svatantrika-Prasangika Distinction: What Difference Does a Difference Make?, Simon and Schuster
- King, Richard (1995), Early Advaita Vedānta and Buddhism: The Mahāyāna Context of the Gauḍapādīya-kārikā, SUNY Press
- Nicholson, Andrew J. (2010), Unifying Hinduism: Philosophy and Identity in Indian Intellectual History, Columbia University Press
