= Svatantrika–Prasaṅgika distinction =

Doctrinal distinction within Tibetan Buddhism

The Svātantrika–Prāsaṅgika distinction is a doctrinal distinction made within Tibetan Buddhism between two stances regarding the use of logic and the meaning of conventional truth within the presentation of Madhyamaka.

Svātantrika is a category of Madhyamaka viewpoints attributed primarily to the 6th-century Indian scholar Bhāviveka. Bhāviveka criticised Buddhapalita’s abstinence from syllogistic reasoning in his commentary on Nāgārjuna. Following the example of the influential logician Dignāga, Bhāviveka used autonomous syllogistic reasoning (svātantra) syllogisms in the explanation of Madhyamaka. To have a common ground with essentialist opponents, and make it possible to use syllogistic reasoning in discussion with those essentialists, Bhāviveka argued that things can be said to exist conventionally 'according to characteristics'. This makes it possible to take the mere object as the point of departure for the discussion on inherent existence. From there, it is possible to explain how these things are ultimately empty of inherent existence.

Prāsaṅgika views are based on Candrakīrti's critique of Bhāviveka, arguing for a sole reliance on prasaṅga, "logic consequence," a method of reductio ad absurdum which is used by all Mādhyamikas, using syllogisms to point out the absurd and impossible logical consequences of holding essentialist views. According to Candrakīrti, the mere object can only be discussed if both parties perceive it in the same way. (Note: Chandrakirti, as quoted by Tsongkhapa in the Lamrim Chenmo, Volume Three: "When one party posits something as a probative reason, even though valid cognition may establish it for the one who posits the syllogism, how can that person be certain that valid cognition establishes it for the other party?" Tsongkhapa, presenting Bhavaviveka's argument: "[According to Bhavaviveka] we must use the mere eye or mere form as the subject. Why? Because it must be established as commonly appearing to both parties.") As a consequence (according to Candrakīrti) svātantrika reasoning is impossible in a debate, since the opponents argue from two irreconcilable points of view, namely a mistaken essentialist perception, and a correct non-essentialist perception. This leaves no ground for a discussion which starts from a similarly perceived object of discussion. And it also makes impossible the use of syllogistic reasoning to convince the opponent. (Note: Candrakirti: "...inaccurate consciousness cannot exist when accurate consciousness is present. So how could the conventional eye, as the subject of a syllogism, exist for an accurate consciousness?" Tsongkhapa: "The passage of the Clear Words that reply to Bhavaviveka show that the subject is not established as appearing in common to the two parties in the debate." Tsongkhapa further explains that in non-Prasangika systems, the object as it appears to ordinary consciousness is the object just as it is. According to Tsongkhapa, this is not sufficient for Madhyamikas, since this object as it appears is a mistaken perception: "Since no phenomenon can, even conventionally, have a nature that is established by way of its intrinsic character, there is no valid cognition that establishes such a thing. It is with this in mind that the master Candrakirti refutes the notion of autonomous syllogism.")

Candrakīrti's works had no influence on Indian and early Tibetan Madhayamaka, but started to rise to prominence in Tibet in the 12th century. Tsongkhapa (1357–1419), the founder of the Gelugpa school and the most outspoken proponent of the distinction, followed Candrakīrti in his rejection of Bhavaviveka's arguments. According to Tsongkhapa, the Svātantrikas do negate intrinsic nature ultimately, but "accept that things conventionally have intrinsic character or intrinsic nature." Tsongkhapa, commenting on Candrakīrti, says that he "refute[s] essential or intrinsic nature even conventionally." For Tsongkhapa, as well as for the Karma Kagyu school, the differences with Bhavaviveka are of major importance.

Established by Lama Tsongkhapa, Candrakīrti's view replaced the Yogācāra-Mādhyamaka approach of Śāntarakṣita (725–788), who synthesized Madhyamaka, Yogācāra and Buddhist logic in a powerful and influential synthesis called Yogācāra-Mādhyamaka. Śāntarakṣita established Buddhism in Tibet, and his Yogācāra-Mādhyamaka was the primary philosophic viewpoint until the 12th century, when the works of Candrakīrti were first translated into Tibetan. In this synthesis, conventional truth or reality is explained and analysed in terms of the Yogācāra system, while the ultimate truth is presented in terms of the Madhyamaka system. While Śāntarakṣita's synthesis reflects the final development of Indian Madhyamaka and post-dates Candrakīrti, Tibetan doxographers ignored the nuances of Śāntarakṣita's synthesis, grouping his approach together with Bhāviveka's, due to their usage of syllogistic reasonings to explain and defend Madhyamaka.

After the 17th century civil war in Tibet and the Mongol intervention which put the Gelugpa school in the center of power, Tsongkhapa's views dominated Tibetan Buddhism until the 20th century. The Rimé movement revived alternate teachings, providing alternatives to Tsongkhapa's interpretation, and reintroducing Śāntarakṣita's nuances. For the Sakya and Nyingma schools, which participated in the Rimé movement, the Svātantrika–Prāsaṅgika distinction is generally viewed to be of lesser importance. For these schools, the key distinction between these viewpoints is whether one works with assertions about the ultimate nature of reality, or if one refrains completely from doing so. If one works with assertions, then that is a Svātantrika approach. Refraining from doing so is a Prāsangika approach. In this context Tenzin Gyatso, his holiness the Dalai Lama, says in a forward to Shantideva's book "A Guide to the Bodhisattva's Way of Life," a work based on the idea that the Mahayana teachings are focused on cultivating a mind wishing to benefit other sentient beings, that Shantideva’s philosophical stance follows the Prāsangika-Madhyamaka viewpoint of Chandrakīrti.

== Indian Madhyamaka ==
Madhyamaka originated with the works of

- Nāgārjuna (c. 150 – c. 250 CE), and his commentators. The Svātantrika–Prāsaṅgika distinction can be traced to the following three commentators:
- Buddhapālita (470 – 550 CE), a minor author in India, whom Tibetan tradition credits as the founder of the Prāsaṅgika "school," was an early adopter of syllogistic and consequentialist methods in his writings, although of a particularly limited form;
- Bhāviveka (c. 500 – c. 578 CE), who was influenced by the developing Buddhist logic initiated by Dignāga (c. 480 – c. 540 CE), and used syllogistic reasoning in his commentary on Nāgārjuna. He did so to catch up with these developments in Buddhist logic, and prevent Madhyamaka from becoming obsolete. His criticisms of Buddhapalita are retrospectively imagined as the foundation of the Svātantrika "school";
- Candrakīrti (c. 600 – c. 650 CE), who defended Buddhapālita against Bhāvyaviveka. Although he "attracted almost no following and made no impact on the development of the Madhyamaka tradition" in India, he became regarded by the Tibetan tradition after 1200 CE as an important proponent of Prāsangika.
- Śāntarakṣita (725–788), who synthesized Madhyamaka, Yogācāra and Buddhist logic in a powerful and influential synthesis called Yogācāra-Mādhyamaka. He established Buddhism in Tibet, and his Yogācāra-Mādhyamaka was the primary philosophic viewpoint established there, which reigned superior until the 12th century, when the works of Candrakīrti were first translated into Tibetan.

The name Prāsaṅgika is derived from Prasaṅga, a method of logical inquiry which deconstructs the opponents' argument in debate through the use of unwanted logical consequences. It arises from Bhāvaviveka's criticism that Buddhapālita ought not to have relied solely on reductio ad absurdum argumentation —hence the name "Prāsangika", from prāsanga ("consequence")—but ought to have set forth "autonomous" (svātantra) syllogisms of his own. (Note: Whether a Madhyamaka viewpoint would allow the necessary factual claims, or statements of epistemological principles, for such an argument was the major point in dispute.)

=== Bhāviveka ===
Bhāviveka (c. 500 – c. 578 CE) argued that autonomous syllogistic reasoning was required when explaining or commenting on Nagarjuna's teachings on voidness or essencelessness. (Note: Padmakar Translation Group: "[According to Bhavya,] the commentator’s role is not to repeat Nagarjuna’s already superlative performance but to discuss it and to present it skillfully. The task at hand is to resolve the element of doubt intrinsic to the consequentialist method, to deal with possible objections, and generally to facilitate the intellectual comprehension of those who require explanation and who cannot as yet penetrate, directly and unaided, the profound message of the original author. To that extent, it is both necessary and fitting to make positive, explanatory statements.") To be able to use syllogistic reasoning, both parties need to share a common object of discussion at the conventional level. While the various opponents have different opinions on the specifics of their teachings, the mere objects or mere forms are commonly appearing to both parties, "enjoy[ing] a certain existence 'according to their characteristics." (Note: Padmakara Translation Group: "Bhavaviveka was apparently aware [that, according to the rules of logic, independent syllogisms commit their user to an implicit and compromising acquiescence in the existence of the elements referred to], and we have seen that, in the interests of consistency, his use of the independent syllogism went hand in hand with a view that, on the conventional level, phenomena do indeed enjoy a certain existence 'according to their characteristics.'")

Bhāviveka criticised Buddhapalita for merely repeating Nāgārjuna's ad absurdum approach in his commentary, instead of clarifying Nāgārjuna's teachings. According to Bhāviveka, syllogistic reasoning could be used for the sake of clarification. (Note: Padmakara Translation Group, Note 12: "Bhavya holds that the consequential arguments of Buddhapalita are not on the same footing as those of Nagarjuna. In both cases, the consequences imply negations that could theoretically be formulated as positive (syllogistic) arguments. The difference between them is that, given what is known to be Nagarjuna's intention (the negation of all four positions of the tetralemma), his negations are to be understood as nonimplicative. But such a concession is not to be granted to the commentator, whose task is to render explicit to the fullest extent the obscurities of the commented text. If the commentator uses consequences (unaccompanied by any positive and clarificatory statement), the resulting negations cannot automatically be regarded as nonimplicative. On the contrary, they are implicative and therefore undesirable in the Madhyamaka context...It is worth noting that it is in Bhavya that the important distinction between implicative and nonimplicative negations first appears.) Bhāviveka further argued that Buddhapalita only showed the logical consequences, and incoherence, of the Samkhya's views on causation and inherent existence, but failed to address their arguments against Buddhist critiques. Furthermore, simply negating the opponent's view, without positing one's own position, "leaves room for doubt in the opponent's mind," and is unwarranted.

To facilitate the possibility of discussing Madhyamaka with opponents, Bhāviveka made a provisional division of the two truths, accepting that phenomena exist "according to their characteristics." Bhāviveka made a further distinction in his treatment of ultimate truth or reality. Ultimate truth or reality transcends discursive thought, and cannot be expressed in words. To be able to talk about it anyway, and distinguish it from relative truth or reality, Bhāviveka makes a distinction between the "world-transcending" or "ultimate truth in itself," which is ineffable and beyond words; and the "pure worldly wisdom" or "approximate truth," which can be talked about and points to the "ultimate truth in itself," which has to be personally experienced.

Dreyfus and McClintock observe that Bhāvaviveka was more influential in Indian Madhyamaka than was Candrakīrti: "In this regard, Bhāvaviveka should probably be seen as quite successful: apart from Candrakīrti and Jayananda, nearly all other Indian Mādhyamikas were to follow in his footsteps and embrace autonomous arguments as important tools in their endeavors to establish the supremacy of the Madhyamaka view."

=== Candrakīrti ===
Candrakīrti (c. 600 – c. 650 CE) had little impact during his lifetime. The first commentary on his Madhyamakāvatāra was written in India in the 11th century, more than 300 years after his death. In the 12th century his works were translated in Tibetan, and became highly influential.

Candrakīrti rejected Bhāviveka's criticism of Buddhapālita, and his use of independent logic. According to Candrakīrti, the mere object can only be discussed if both parties perceive it in the same way. According to Candrakīrti, this is impossible, since the opponents argue from two irreconcilable points of view, namely a mistaken essentialist perception, and a correct non-essentialist perception. This leaves no ground for a discussion starting from a similarly perceived object of discussion, and also makes impossible the use of syllogistic reasoning to convince the opponent. According to Candrakīrti, without a conventionally appearing set of characteristics to designate upon, the Svātantrika would not be able to establish a syllogism. (Note: Daniel Cozort: "[For the Svātantrika, if the subject of the debate is not] established as commonly appearing and as demonstrably established objectively, they are not able to prove the modes of the sign in terms of such (a subject) because it is not feasible that there be a predicate of a nonexistent substratum.")

Candrakīrti also rejected Bhāviveka's argument that autonomous arguments should be used in commentaries to clarify the original text, noting that Nāgārjuna himself, in his auto-commentary on the Vigrahavyavartani, also didn't use autonomous arguments.

Candrakīrti rejected "the use of autonomous arguments, for the very reason that they imply the acceptance (however provisional) of entities. According to Candrakīrti, this mode of thinking is a subtle form of grasping at inherent existence: one's mind is still searching for some way to hold on to an essence, self, or identity for conventionally perceived objects. For Candrakīrti, there is no use in explaining the relative truth in any philosophical system; "the relative truth consists simply of phenomena as we observe them, the unanalyzed constituents of the common consensus." The only aim of consequential arguments "is to introduce the mind to the direct knowledge of emptiness, not an intellectual understanding of it," making "no concessions to the spiritually unprepared."

Candrakīrti's criticism was "part of a wider rejection of the logico-epistemological tradition of Dignāga, which he regarded as a misguided attempt to find "philosophical completeness" and a sense of intellectual security that is antithetical to the fundamental insight of Madhyamaka." Candrakīrti did not reject the use of logic, but it served to demarcate the limits of discursive thought. In the absence of any agreement between Mādhyamikas and substantialists, prasaṅga is the best approach "to indicate the ultimate without making statements that [...] compromise or [...] obscure their own position." Since the use of autonomous arguments implies the acceptance of real entities, even if only provisional, they should not be used.

=== Śāntarakṣita ===
Born and educated in India, Śāntarakṣita (725–788) came to the Tibetan Empire at the instigation of King Trisong Detsen after Nyang Tingdzin Zangpo had encouraged the King to make the invitation. Śāntarakṣita came to Tibet sometime before 767 CE. He oversaw the construction of the first Buddhist monastery at Samye in 787 CE, ordained the first monastics there, had Indian Buddhist texts brought to Tibet, and started the first translation project. He also advised the king to invite Padmasambhava to come to Tibet. He was also instrumental in the coming of Kamalaśīla to Tibet, who participated in the so-called "council of Lhasa," which, according to Tibetan tradition, led to the defeat of the Chinese Chan monk Moheyan, and the establishment of Indian Buddhism as the norm for Tibetan Buddhism.

Śāntarakṣita synthesised Madhyamaka, Yogācāra, and the logico-epistemological tradition of Dignaga and Dharmakirti. In this synthesis, conventional truth or reality is explained and analysed in terms of the Yogācāra system, while the ultimate truth is presented in terms of the Madhyamaka system.

== Tibetan Madhyamaka ==
=== Divisions prior to the distinction ===
When Buddhism was established in Tibet, the primary philosophic viewpoint established there was that of Śāntarakṣita (725–788), a synthesis of Madhyamaka, Yogācāra and Buddhist logic called Yogācāra-Mādhyamaka. A common distinction of Madhyamaka teachings was given by Jñanasutra (Wylie: ye shes sde, 8th–9th centuries), a student of Śāntarakṣita:

1. "Sautrāntika-Madhyamaka," including Bhāviveka; and
2. "Yogācāra-Madhyamaka," including Śāntarakṣita, Kamalaśīla, and Haribhadra.

The difference lies in their "acceptance or rejection of extramental phenomena on the conventional level." While Bhavaviveka considered material phenomena at the conventional level as to be existent outside the mind, he applied Sautrāntika terminology to describe and explain them. Śāntarakṣita rejected this approach, denying "the extramental status of phenomena appearing within the sphere of conventional truth." Instead, he saw conventional phenomena as manifestations of the mind, in line with the Yogācāra approach.

Candrakīrti's works were known in Tibet as early as the 8th century, but "specifically in connection with the logical tradition," when Candrakīrti's Yuktishashtika was translated by Yeshe De (Jñanasutra) and some others. The Prāsangika-Svātantrika distinction was possibly invented by the Tibetan translator Pa tshab nyi ma grags (1055–1145), using the terms Rang rgyud pa and Thal 'gyur ba, which were Sanskritized by modern scholars as Svātantrika and Prāsaṅgika. According to Dreyfus and McClintock, Tibetan scholars themselves state that the distinction "is a Tibetan creation that was retroactively applied in an attempt to bring clarity and order to the study of contemporary Indian Madhyamaka interpretations." (Note: Tsongkhapa commented on this distinction, stating that "since [the use of the terms Prāsangika and Svātantrika agree] with Chandrakırti’s Clear Words (Prasannapada), you should not suppose that" it is a Tibetan fabrication.) Later Gelugpa scholars as well as Nyingmapas, after Candrakīrti's works were translated in Tibetan in the 12th century, considered both of the above to constitute subdivisions of Svātantrika, however, under the names of "Sautrāntika-Svātantrika-Madhyamaka and "Yogācāra-Svātantrika-Madhyamaka."

Those various teachers, and their approaches were grouped together due to their usage of syllogistic reasonings to explain and defend Madhyamaka, in disregard of the philosophical nuances of Śāntarakṣita's approach.

A related doctrinal topic of profound disagreement is between Rangtong-Shentong, which concerns the "nature" of ultimate truth as empty of a self or essence, or as constituting an absolute reality which is "truly existing" and empty of any other, transitional phenomena. (Note: This is also related to Rangtong-Shentong the idea of Buddha Nature)

=== Lama Tsongkhapa and Gelugpa's dominant view ===
Initially, this new distinction based on Candrakīrti's Prasannapada met with fierce resistance in Tibet, but gained in popularity and was strongly supported by Je Tsongkhapa (1357 – 1419 CE). He became the most outspoken defender of the Svātantrika-Prāsaṅgika distinction, arguing that "the two subschools are separated by crucial philosophical differences, including a different understanding of emptiness and of conventional reality." Tsongkhapa was a powerful personality with a large following, but he too met with a strong resistance, especially within the Sakya school to which he originally belonged. His critics rejected his interpretation as "inadequate, newfangled, and unsupported by tradition." According to those critics, Tsongkhapa had "greatly exaggerated the divergence of view."

Tsongkhapa's view became the dominant view in the beginning of the 17th century, when Gusri Khan (1582–1655) ended the civil war in central Tibet, putting the 5th Dalai Lama in command of the temples in Tibet. This gave the Gelugpa school a strong political power, and the means to effectively ban the writings of Tsongkhapa's critics.

==== Tsongkhapa's view ====
For Tsongkhapa, the Svātantrika–Prāsaṅgika distinction centers around the usage of autonomous syllogistic reasoning to convince opponents of the Madhyamaka point of view, and the implications of the establishment of conventional existence 'according to characteristics'.

Tsongkhapa objected against Bhaviveka's use of autonomous syllogistic reasoning in explaining voidness or essencelessness. To be able to use syllogistic reasoning, both parties need to have a common ground onto which those syllogistic reasonings can be applied. This common ground is the shared perception of the object whose's emptiness of inherent existence is to be established. According to Bhaviveka, this shared perception is possible because the perceived objects are mentally imputed (labeled) based on characteristic marks which distinguishes them from other objects. (Note: Alexander Berzin, Self-Voidness and Other Voidness) (Note: Alexander Berzin: "[In Svatantrika] [y]ou establish that [something] exists because it can be imputed (or labeled) with a name or concept; that’s what establishes that it exists. But it’s not only that which establishes that it exists, because there are findable characteristic marks on the side of the object which make it what it is, and in conjunction with mental labeling you can establish that it exists. So the relative truth of things: you have these findable characteristic marks. And deepest truth: no such thing as true unimputed existence.)

The Prāsaṅgika reject this idea, arguing that "[w]hat establishes that things exist is only that they are imputable, not that they are imputable with a findable characteristic." According to Tsongkhapa, there is no such common ground or shared perception, (Note: Daniel Cozort: "The meaning of autonomy (rang rgyud, svatantra) is asserted as: the generation of inferential cognition realizing the probandum (bsgrub bya) within the (context of the three modes)[of a syllogism] being established." Therefore, if the subject "on which depend the predicates about which the two parties debate [... does] not exist within being established as commonly appearing and as demonstrably established objectively, they are not able to prove the modes of the sign." Because "it is not feasible that there be a predicate of a nonexistent substratum.") while the reliance on characteristic marks implies an inherent existence at the conventional level, which is not in accord with the Madhyamaka point of view.

Tsongkhapa holds reductio ad absurdum of essentialist viewpoints to be the most valid method of demonstrating emptiness of inherent existence, and of demonstrating that conventional things do not have a naturally occurring conventional identity. (Note: Gareth Sparham (2017), Tsongkhapa, Stanford Encyclopedia of Philosophy) (Note: Sparham: "Tsongkhapa does not accept svātantra (“autonomous”) reasoning (the fourth point). He asserts that it is enough, when proving that any given subject is empty of intrinsic existence, to lead the interlocutor, through reasoning, to the unwelcome consequences (prasaṅga) in their own untenable position; it is not necessary to demonstrate the thesis based on reasoning that presupposes any sort of intrinsic (=autonomous) existence. This gives Tsongkhapa's philosophy its name *Prāsaṅgika-madhyamaka, i.e., a philosophy of a middle way (between nihilism and eternalism) arrived at through demonstrating the unwelcome consequences (in any given position that presupposes intrinsic existence).") According to Tsongkhapa, if both people in a debate or discussion have a valid understanding of emptiness already, then autonomous syllogistic arguments could be quite effective. However, in a circumstance where one or both parties in a debate or discussion do not hold a valid understanding, "the debate [should be] founded on what the parties accept as valid. Hence, it is proper to refute opponents in terms of what they accept." In other words, it is more appropriate to establish a position of emptiness through showing the logical consequences of the incorrect position that the opponent already accepts, than it is to establish emptiness through syllogistic reasoning using premises that the opponent (and perhaps even the proponent) do not fully or deeply understand.

While Tsongkhapa's view met with strong resistance after their introduction, his views came to dominate Tibet in the 17th century, with the Ganden Phodrang government, after the military intervention of the Mongol lord Gusri Khan. He supported the Gelugpa's against the Tsangpa family, and put the 5th Dalai Lama in charge of Tibet. Seminal texts which were critical of Tsongkhapa's views, such as Gorampa's critique, "ceased to be available and were almost lost."

===== Tsongkhapa's Eight Difficult Points =====
Lama Tsongkhapa outline eight key points that differentiate the Prāsaṅgika from his opponents that, according to him, hold a Svātantrika view. They are:

1. Refutation, even at a conventional level, of the ālāyavijñāna (or storehouse-consciousness);
2. Nonexistence of reflexive awareness;
3. Rejection of autonomous syllogisms in order to establish the ultimate view;
4. The assertion of the existence of external objects on the same level as cognition;
5. The assertion that the Śrāvakas and Pratyekabuddhas comprehend the selfless of phenomena;
6. The assertion that the grasping to the self of phenomena is a negative emotion;
7. The assertion that disintegration is a functioning (impermanent) thing;
8. The uncommon presentation of the three times (past, present and future).

However, many scholars will assert that the main difference is condensed in point 3: the use of autonomous syllogisms by the Svātantrikas and the reductio ad absurdum by the Prāsaṅgikas, whereas they consider the other points posited by Tsongkhapa as just minor doctrinal differences in Gelugpa's Madhyamaka approach. Others schools assert that Tsongkhapa exaggerated the gap between Svātantrika and Prāsaṅgika by positing another 7 points.

=== Alternate views and criticism ===
According to Dreyfus & McClintock, "many other Tibetan commentators have tended to downplay the significance of any differences."

==== Nyingma ====
In the 19th century the concurring Nyingma, Kagyu and Sakya schools joined forces in the Rimé movement, in an attempt to preserve their religious legacy against the dominant Gelugpa school. Ju Mipham's commentary on Śāntarakṣita's Madhyamakālaṃkāra ("The Adornment of the Middle Way") is an example of this new impetus to older strands of Tibetan Buddhism. Mipham presents an alternative interpretation of the Svātantrika–Prāsaṅgika distinction, in which the emphasis is not on "dialectical preferences," (consequential reasoning versus syllogistic reasoning), but on the distinction between the "approximate ultimate truth" and the "actual ultimate truth," just like Bhāviveka did. According to Mipham, "the authentic Svatantrika is the approach that emphasizes the approximate ultimate, while the Prasangika approach emphasizes the ultimate in itself, beyond all assertions." His is a gradual approach, starting with sensory experience and the 'realness' of the "things" perceived through them, which are "provisionally accorded a certain existence." From there the approximate ultimate truth is posited, demonstrating that "phenomena cannot possibly exist in the way that they appear," invalidating the conventional reality of appearances. From there, "the ultimate truth in itself, which is completely free from all assertion, is reached." While the Svātantrikas do make assertions about conventional truth or reality, they stay silent on the ultimate in itself, just like the Prāsaṅgikas.

In the light of Mipham's writings, the Prāsaṅgikas reject the Svātantrikas' approach by the use of "three sovereign reasoning", which are three absurd consequences deriving from the separation between the two truths emphasized by the Svātantrikas. They are: (1) the āryas' meditation on emptiness would destroy phenomena; (2) production according to its characteristics could not be disproved on the ultimate level; and (3) the conventional truth would resist absolute analysis. These correspond respectively to stanzas 34, 36 and 35 in the sixth chapter of Candrakīrti's Madhyamakāvatāra presented in Mipham's commentarial outline.

According to Ju Mipham, Tsongkhapa's approach was seriously flawed. Tsongkhapa's approach leads students in the right direction but will not lead to the true ultimate until they go further. Mipham further argues that Tsongkhapa's approach is an excellent Svātantrika approach, because of the way he refutes true establishment instead of objects themselves. According to the Padmakara Translation Group, "its presentation of "conventional," as distinct from "true," existence seems very close to the "existence according to characteristics" that Bhavya had ascribed to phenomena on the relative level.

==== Sakya ====
The Sakya teacher Gorampa was critical of Tsongkhapa and his views. One of Gorampa's most important and popular works is Distinguishing the Views (Tibetan: ལྟ་བའི་ཤན་འབྱེད, Wylie: lta ba'i shan 'byed), in which he argues for his view of Madhyamaka. He and other Sakya teachers classify themselves as presenting the "Freedom from Proliferation" (Tibetan: སྤྲོས་བྲལ་, Wylie: spros bral) Madhyamaka. Gorampa does not agree with Tsonghkapa that the Prāsaṅgika and Svātantrika methods produce different results, nor that the Prāsaṅgika is a "higher" view. He does also critique the Svātantrika approach as having too much reliance on logic, because in his view the component parts of syllogistic logic are not applicable in the realm of the ultimate. But this critique is constrained to the methodology, and he believed both approaches reach the same ultimate realization.

Mainstream Sakyas (following Rongtön and Gorampa) also hold the position that the distinction between these two schools is merely of a pedagogical nature. With regard to the view of the ultimate truth there is no difference between them.

==== Kagyu ====
Kagyu and Sakya scholars have argued against the claim that students using Svātantrika do not achieve the same realization as those using the Prāsaṅgika approach. According to those critics, there is no difference in the realization of those using the Svātantrika and Prāsaṅgika approaches. They also argue that the Svātantrika approach is better for students who are not able to understand the more direct approach of Prāsaṅgika, but it nonetheless results in the same ultimate realization.

==== Gelugpa ====
The debate is also not strictly along lineage lines, since there are some non-Gelugpa's who prefer Je Tsongkhapa's points, while a notable Gelugpa, Gendün Chöphel, preferred and wrote about Ju Mipham's interpretation.

While Lama Tsongkhapa's approach to Madhyamaka is still viewed as authoritative in the Gelug school of Tibetan Buddhism, the 14th Dalai integrates Gelugpa Madhyamaka with Dzogchen views, as did the 5th Dalai Lama. The 14th Dalai Lama has published works like The Gelug/Kagyu Tradition of Mahamudra which seem to be influenced by the views of Śāntarakṣita and Padmasambhava, and contain a blend of Tantric theory, Chittamātra, and Madyamaka-Prāsaṅgika.

The 14th Dalai Lama, echoing sentiments from classical authorities like Lobsang Chökyi Gyaltsen (4th Panchen Lama), states that the credible teachers of the various systems of Buddhist philosophy all "arrive at the same intended point" of realization. However, it is also stated that this non-denominational position is very difficult to establish through reason.

== See also ==
- Schools of Buddhism
- Rangtong-Shentong

== Sources ==
Primary printed sources

- Geshe Kelsang Gyatso (1995), Ocean of Nectar, Tharpa Publications, ISBN 978-0-948006-23-4
- Shantarakshita; Ju Mipham (2005), The Adornment of the Middle Way, Padmakara Translation, ISBN 1-59030-241-9
- Tsong Khapa (2002), The great treatise on the stages of the path to enlightenment: Volume 3, Snow Lion Publications, ISBN 1-55939-166-9
- Tsonghkhapa (2006), Ocean of Reasoning, Oxford University Press, ISBN 978-0-19-514732-2

Secondary printed sources

- Brunhölzl, Karl (2004), Center of the Sunlit Sky: Madhyamaka in the Kagyu Tradition, Snow Lion Publications
- Cabezon, J. I.; Lobsang Dargyay (2007), Freedom from Extremes. Gorampa's "Distinguishing the View" and the Polemics of Emptiness, Wisdom (Sakya)
- Cheng, Hsueh-Li (1981), "The Roots of Zen Buddhism", Journal of Chinese Philosophy, 8 (4): 451–478, doi:10.1111/j.1540-6253.1981.tb00267.x
- Cornu, Philippe (2001), "Nawoord", Schijn en werkelijkheid. De twee waarheden in de vier boeddhistische leerstelsels, KunchabPublicaties
- Cozort, Daniel (1989). Unique Tenets of the Middle Way Consequence School (PhD dissertation). OCLC 1195442831.
- Dreyfus, Georges B. J.; McClintock, Sara L., eds. (2003). The Svatantrika-Prasangika Distinction: What Difference Does a Difference Make?. Simon and Schuster. ISBN 0861713249.
- Dreyfus, Georges B.J.; McClintock, L. Sara (2015), "Introduction", in Dreyfus, Georges B.J.; McClintock, Sara L. (eds.), Svatantrika-Prasangika Distinction: What Difference Does a Difference Make?, Simon and Schuster
- Garfield, Jay L.; Thakchöe, Sonam (2011), "Identifying the Object of Negation and the Status of Conventional Truth: Why the dGag Bya Matters So Much to Tibetan Mādhyamikas", in Cowherds (ed.), Moonshadows: Conventional Truth in Buddhist Philosophy, Oxford University Press
- Hopkins, Jeffrey (1994), "A Tibetan Perspective on the Nature of Spiritual Experience", in Buswell, Robert E. Jr.; Gimello, Robert M. (eds.), Paths to Liberation. The Marga and its Transformations in Buddhist Thought, Motilal Banarsidass
- Hopkins, Jeffrey (1999), "Emptiness Yoga", Kalachakra Tantra. Rite of Initiation, Wisdom Publications
- Jinpa, Thupten (2006), "Negation, identyfying its object", in Leaman, Oliver (ed.), Encyclopedia of Asian Philosophy, Routledge
- Newland, Guy (1999), Schijn en werkelijkheid. De twee waarheden in de vier boeddhistische leerstelsels, KunchabPublicaties
- Padmakara Translation Group (2005), "Translator's Introduction", The Adornment of the Middle Way. Shantarakshita's Madhyamakalankara with commentary by Jamgön Mipham, Shambhala
- Padmakara Translation Group (2012), "Translator's Introduction", Introduction to the Middle Way. Candrakirti's Madhyamakavatara; with commentary by Ju Mipham, Shambhala
- Rizzi, Cesare (1988), Candrakīrti, Motilal Banarsidass
- 1st Panchen Lama; 14th Dalai Lama; Berzin, Alexander (1997), "Session 10", The Gelug/Kagyu Tradition of Mahamudra (PDF), Shambhala (Gelugpa)

Web-sources
