= Mahābheri Sūtra =

Mahayana Buddhist sutra

The Great Drum Sūtra (MBhS, Sanskrit: *Mahābherisūtra; Chinese: 大法鼓經, Dà fǎ gǔ jīng, or *Mahābherīhārakaparivartasūtra, Sutra Chapter on the Beater of the Great Drum, Tibetan: 'phags pa rnga bo che chen po'i le'u zhes bya ba theg pa chen po'i mdo) is a Mahayana Buddhist sutra of the tathāgatagarbha type.

The Mahābherisūtra focuses on buddha-nature (tathāgatagarbha), describing it as luminous, pure, permanent, eternal, everlasting, peaceful, and as a self (ātman). According to C.V. Jones "the MBhS is committed to the idea that the liberation of Buddhas is a kind of enduring existence, and advances the tathāgatagarbha of sentient beings as that aspect of them which will eventually enjoy this status."

== Background ==
The Indian Sanskrit MBhS was translated into Chinese by Guṇabhadra (c. fifth century) as Dà fǎ gǔ jīng (T. 270). It was translated into Tibetan (Derge no. 222; Q. 888) by Vidyākaraprabha, Dpal gyi limn po, and Dpal brtsegs in the 9th century CE. The Tibetan translation is slightly longer with minor alterations.

According to Jones and Suzuki Takayasu, the MBhS is related to the Mahāparinirvāṇa, Aṅgulimālīya and Mahāmegha Sūtras, all of which form a group of related sutras sometimes termed "the Mahāparinirvāṇasūtra- Group".

Jones also argues that the MBhS is an earlier text than the Anūnatvāpūrṇatvanirdeśaparivarta, with which it shares some features.

The MBhS also shows doctrinal similarities with the Lotus Sutra (Saddharmapuṇḍarīka), including: a similar presentation of dharmabhāṇakas (dharma reciters / preachers), both include incredulous hinayana monks who leave the assembly before the sutra is taught, both texts say that "the recitation of the sūtra constitutes the Buddha's recurring presence in the world", both texts contain the parables of the illusory city and the lost son as explanations of hinayana, both texts teach the ekayāna (one vehicle) doctrine and both discuss a revered monk named Sarvalokapriyadarśana. Regarding the teaching of the ekayāna (one vehicle), the MBhS links this with the teaching of tathāgatagarbha and buddha-nature. As such, Jones argues that the Mahābheri shows a marrying of ideas from the Mahāparinirvāṇa and the Lotus sutra.

== Overview ==
The sutra begins with King Prasenajit coming to see the Buddha, accompanied by the beating of drums and sounding of conches. The Buddha is then said to "beat the great drum of the dharma" and "blast the great conch of the dharma". The sutra also compares the power of the Dharma Drum to remove the three poisons (lust, hatred, and delusion) to a magical drum which can extract poisoned arrows from soldiers when beaten.

Towards the end of the sutra, it is revealed that various phantoms made by the demon Mara are hidden among the assembly. Several sravakas and bodhisattvas, like Mahakasyapa, are unable to root them out. Then, a layman known as Sarvalokapriyadarśana or Sarvasattvapriyadarśana is shown as being capable of catching Mara's minions. The Buddha then reveals that Sarvasattvapriyadarśana only appears to be a common person (prthagjana), while in reality he is an advanced being who will become a Buddha in the future.

=== Buddha-nature ===
This sutra focuses on the tathāgatagarbha ("buddha-womb") doctrine, which it presents as the essential nature or element (dhātu) of all sentient beings (i.e. the buddha-nature). It also states that this buddha-nature is the true ātman of living beings, and as such, presents a Buddhist ātma-vada doctrine. According to the MBhS, sentient beings have a tathāgatagarbha, which is also described by the terms ātman (a true self) and sattvadhātu (here meaning a basic element of sentient beings or an essential nature which is "immeasurable and pure"). The sutra shares the use of the term sattvadhātu with the Anūnatvāpurnatvanirdeśa, and the term ātman with the Mahāparinirvāṇa, and the Aṅgulimālīya. Furthermore, according to Karl Brunnhölzl, "in this sūtra, the Buddha uses the terms tathāgatagarbha, tathāgatadhātu, and buddhadhātu interchangeably."

Like the Mahāparinirvāṇasūtra, the Mahābherī also teaches the simile of the refinement of milk into butter and then ghee as a way to explain the manifestation of buddha-nature. According to the sutra, ordinary people are like a mix of milk and blood, those who have taken refuge are like pure milk, new bodhisattvas are like cream, bodhisattvas on the first seven bhūmis are like fresh butter, arhats and bodhisattvas on the ninth and tenth levels are like melted butter and Buddhas are like ghee.

According to the MBhS, the ātman is what is realized by Buddhas when they attain awakening and is characterized by "sovereignty" (自在; dbang phyug; aiśvarya) which only a Buddha can know and realize. The sutra further states that this sovereignty can only be unlocked after awakening, and that before awakening, the ātman of each sentient being is like an imprisoned king which lacks sovereignty.

The Mahābherisūtra also states that the ātman is a permanent element that is present in sentient beings which remains after the attainment of liberation. It compares the self (ātman) to the gold element ("dhātu", which can also mean "material element") which can be covered by impurities and yet retain its pure nature as gold. As the sutra states:

Lord, [if sentient beings] attain liberation and sovereignty, one should know that sentient beings certainly ought to have permanence. For example, when one sees smoke one knows that there is necessarily fire. If there exists a self, there must be liberation. If it is taught that there is a self, this is the liberation with a form that was already explained [above]; this is not the worldly view of a self, nor is it expounding annihilationism or eternalism.

The sutra also states that this self is not the worldly view of a self, and as such affirms the teaching of anātman (not-self), as a skillful means which does away with wrong views of a self.

=== The eternal nature of the Buddha ===
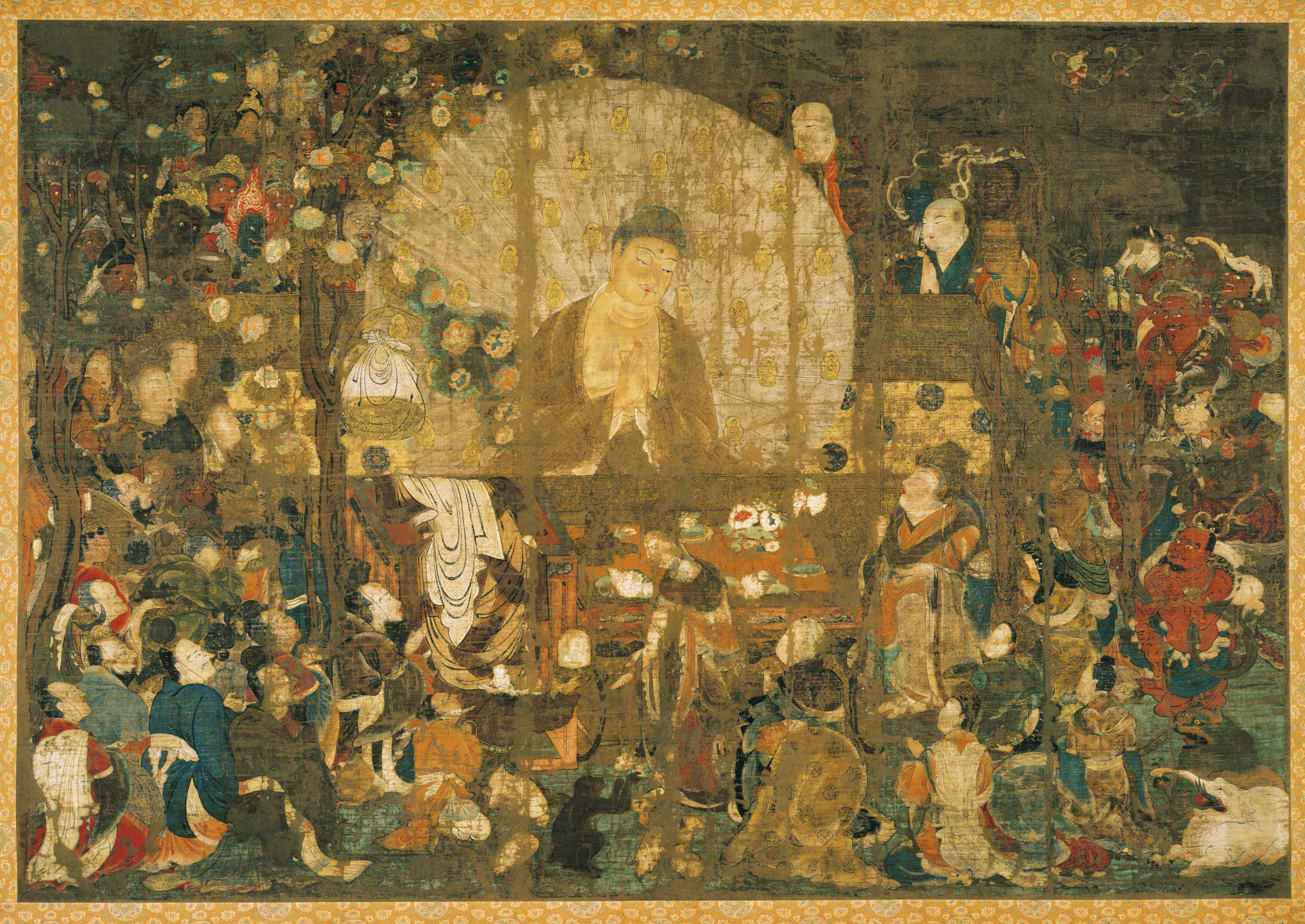
Shakyamuni Buddha's transcendent body arising from his golden tomb (representing his eternal nature), 11th century scroll, Kyoto National Museum

Like the Mahāparinirvāṇamahāsūtra, the Mahābherisūtra also teaches that the Buddha continues to exist after his final nirvāṇa, describing this as "a liberation that is a kind of existence" (Ch: 解脱是有; Tib. thar pa yod pa nyid) which entails the realization of the ātman.

According to Jones, the MBhS presents the nirvāṇa attained by the Buddha as "a kind of a kind of permanent existence free from bondage to rebirth." Thus, the sutra states:

The secret teaching [of this sūtra] is that, while it is said that the Tathāgata has completely passed over into nirvāṇa, in reality the Tathāgata is permanent, abiding, and without destruction: parinirvāṇa is not characterized by destruction.

The sutra also speaks of the Buddha's "permanently abiding dharmakāya manifesting great supernatural powers." It also argues that the Buddha's nirvana cannot be a non-existent state nor a reality that completely lacks self, since:

The Tathāgata is a god among gods. If parinirvāṇa were complete annihilation, the world would be [gradually] destroyed. If [parinirvāṇa] is not annihilation, then it is permanently abiding and joyful. Since it is permanently abiding and joyful, then certainly there exists a self, just as [where there is] smoke, there is fire.

=== Emptiness as a provisional teaching ===
The Mahābherisūtra criticizes certain Buddhist interpretations of emptiness which reject the buddha-nature teachings on the self:

[Members of the saṅgha] in the expressions 'there is a self' and 'there is absence of self' fear the expression 'there is a self'; they adopt the annihilationist view of great emptiness, and cultivate non-self. In this way they do not produce faith in the very profound sūtras of the tathāgatagarbha, and of the permanent abiding of the Buddhas.

Furthermore, according to the Mahābheri, all the emptiness teachings should be seen as provisional, having a specific intent behind them. In contrast to these expedient sutras which teach emptiness, unsurpassed sutras which teach the permanence of the Buddha and buddha-nature, like the Mahābherīsūtra, are to be seen as definitive. Those who reject these sutras are seen as lazy, corrupt and uncontrolled. The Mahābherisūtra also argues that those who do not understand the expedient nature of the sutras which teach emptiness are lead astray.

For the Mahābherisūtra, emptiness and not-self are teachings which only apply to samsaric phenomena and the afflictions, but not to the basis of samsara - great nirvāṇa which is eternal and peaceful. The Buddha further states in this sutra that he only teaches not-self in order to overcome the worldly notion of self and to develop people in faith and insight. After someone has trained in emptiness, then the Buddha teaches them the truth about what is truly existent, peaceful and eternal - the true self, the buddha-nature (which is also beyond annihilation and eternalism).

== See also ==
- Ātman (Buddhism)
- Tathāgatagarbha sūtras
- Buddha-Nature
- Purity in Buddhism

== Bibliography ==
- Brunnhölzl, Karl (2014). When the Clouds Part, The Uttaratantra and Its Meditative Tradition as a Bridge between Sutra and Tantra, pp. 23-24. Boston & London: Snow Lion.
- Jones, C.V. "Beings, Non-Beings, and Buddhas: Contrasting Notions of tathāgatagarbha in the Anūnatvāpūrṇatvanirdeśaparivarta and *Mahābherī Sūtra". JOCBS. 2016(5): 53-84
