= Mahāmegha Sūtra =

The Mahāmegha Sūtra (Great Cloud Sutra, Chinese: Dayun jing 大雲經, Tibetan: Sprin chen po'i mdo) is a Mahayana sutra of the tathāgatagarbha type. The sutra shares similarities with the Nirvana sutra, and teaches that the Buddha is eternal and does not really pass into parinirvāṇa.

== Overview ==
The Mahāmegha Sūtra was translated into Chinese in the fifth century by Dharmakṣema (385–433) as Great Vaipulya Great Cloud Sutra (Chinese: 大方等大雲 經, T. 387, *Mahāvaipulyamahāmeghasūtra). Certain Chinese sources attribute a translation of the sutra to another figure, Zhu Fonian.

A Tibetan translation (Sprin chen po, Toh 232) was completed by Surendrabodhi and Yeshe Dé in the 9th century. A Sanskrit manuscript which preserves eighty percent of the text in Sanskrit has been discovered.

The sutra contains a long introduction (nidana) which lists a huge assembly of many types of beings, bodhisattvas, etc. The first main part of the Mahāmegha Sūtra is a dialogue between a bodhisattva named Great Cloud Essence (Skt: *Mahāmeghagarbha, Ch: 大雲密藏) and the Buddha which touches on over a hundred topics related to the bodhisattva path and the Mahayana.

=== Doctrine ===
The Mahāmegha Sūtra shares various key doctrines with other tathāgatagarbha sutras like the Anūnatvāpūrṇatvanirdeśa, the Mahāparinirvāṇamahāsūtra and the Mahābherīhārakasūtra.

These include:

- the docetic and illusory nature of the Buddha's parinirvāṇa (and indeed all his actions in the world),
- the eternity of the Buddha's true body (dharmakāya or vajrakāya)
- the four inversions (viparyāsas) and how they do not apply to the Buddha's ultimate nature, which is constant, blissful, pure, and a self
- how sentient beings are not distinct from the dharmadhātu
- the inferiority of the śrāvakas and pratyekabuddhas
- buddha-nature (tathāgatagarbha)
- the figure of *Sarvasattvapriyadarśana (一切眾生樂見), a dharma teacher (dharmabhāṇaka) found in other buddha-nature sutras
- the promotion of a Mahayana vegetarianism

Like the Nirvana sutra, the Mahāmegha affirms the eternal nature of the Buddha in various passages. For example, it states "all tathāgatas are permanent, eternal, tranquil, and stable" (ch. 38.79).

The Mahāmegha also states that teachings on impermanence, not-self and emptiness mainly refer to samsaric phenomena, like the afflictions, but they do not apply to the true nature of the Buddha, to "the permanence of the Tathāgata." According to the sutra, those who only meditate on emptiness without understanding the permanence of the Tathāgata have failed to understand the deep meaning of the Buddha's words and will continue to transmigrate in samsara (ch. 38.115).

Regarding the doctrine of buddha-nature - tathāgatagarbha, the Mahāmegha Sūtra's exposition is similar to that of the Mahāparinirvāṇamahāsūtra. The Mahāmegha states that its "secret teaching" is that all sentient beings have the tathāgatagarbha within and that this is something to be known.

Several chapters also list and sometimes describe numerous "gateways" to Mahayana practice, including "samādhi gateways", "dhāraṇī gateways", "liberation gateways", Dharma gateways, etc. Many of these chapters mostly contain long lists of the names of these gateways, other chapters describe the miraculous powers bodhisattvas attain through the use of some of these gateways. Some of these powers include the ability to appear in countless forms for the benefit of beings and their use of an empowered manifestation body (adhiṣṭhānakāya).

Furthermore, other chapters discuss various bodhisattva practices, such as the use of skillful means. According to the sutra, bodhisattvas may appear in numerous forms, including: as ill people, as filled with craving, as non-Buddhist renunciants, as schismatics, as performing the deeds of Māra, as animals, and as Buddhas entering final nirvana (38.138-162).

=== Prophecies ===
In the second main part of the sutra, a Brahmin named Kauṇḍinya enters into a dialogue with the Buddha regarding the Buddha's seemingly evil cousin Devadatta. However, it is revealed by the bodhisattva Great Cloud Essence that Devadatta and his schismatic followers are truly bodhisattva mahāpuruṣas (great beings) and that their actions were a display of skillful means that were all in accord with the Buddha's divine plan.

The sutra also discusses a prophecy regarding the Dharma ending age. It states that a figure named *Sarvasattvapriyadarśana (一切眾生樂見) will be the guardian of the true Dharma during the age of the decline of the Dharma.

The sutra also contains a female bodhisattva devī (goddess) named *Vimalaprabhā. In one passage, the Buddha gives a prediction about her future attainments and exploits as a great queen. When the bodhisattva Mahāmeghagarbha assumes that this entails that the female bodhisattva will have to take on a male body, he is criticized by the Buddha, who explains that Vimalaprabhā deliberately takes on the skillful form (*upāyakāya, 方便之身) of a woman for eons, all for the sake of sentient beings. The Buddha eventually prophecies that Vimalaprabhā will become a Buddha and preside over her own buddha-field.

This story was used by the Chinese empress Wu Zetian (the de facto ruler of the Tang dynasty from 665 to 705) as part of her propaganda to promote herself as a bodhisattva.

== See also ==
- Ātman (Buddhism)
- Tathāgatagarbha sūtras
- Buddha-Nature
