= Yogambara =

Tutelary deity in Tibetan Buddhism

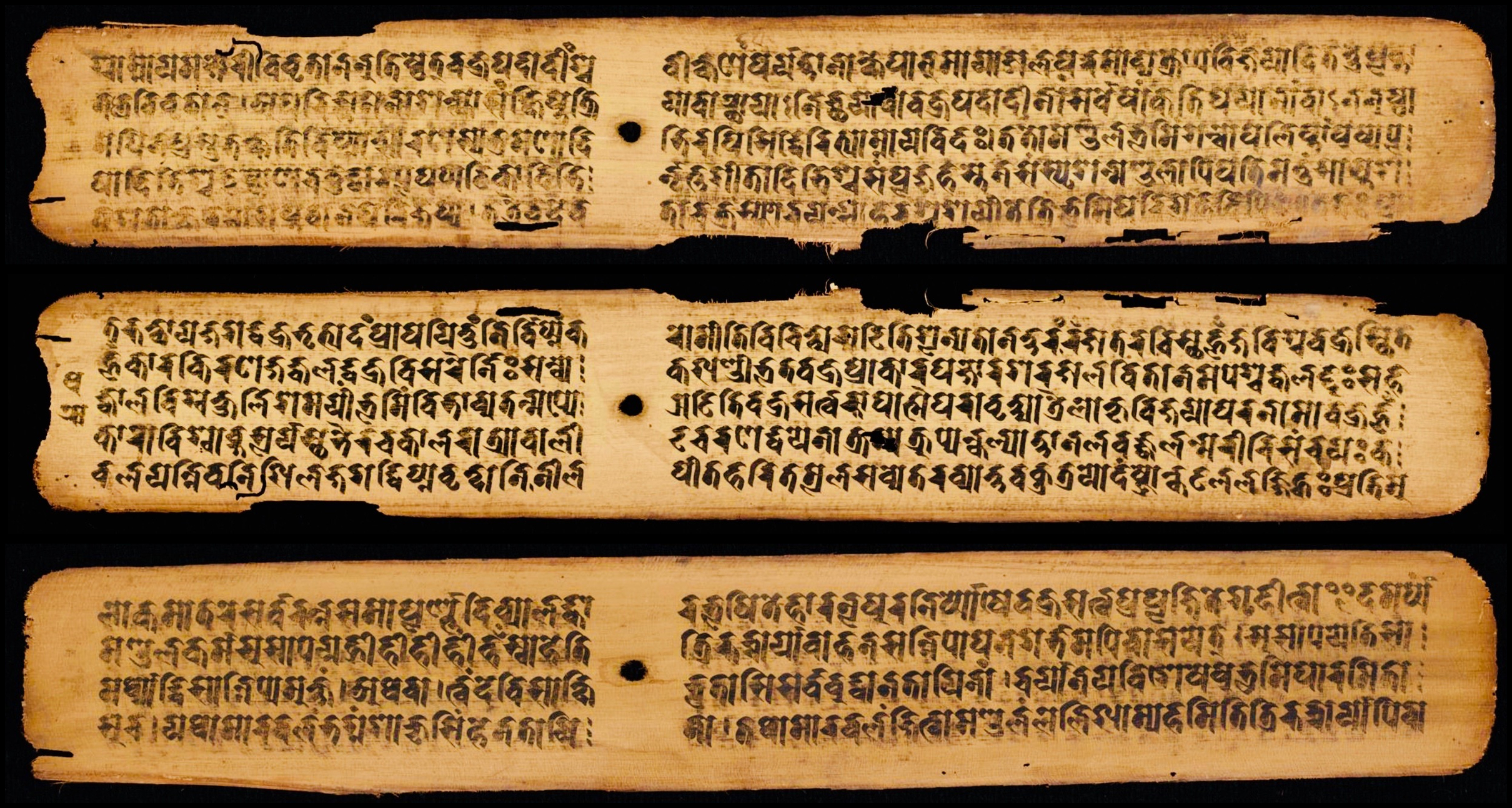
Yogambara is mentioned in the Vajravali manuscript, a Buddhist tantric text (c. 1100 CE)

Yogambara (Tibetan: nam khai nal jor), is a tutelary deity in Tibetan Buddhism belonging to the Wisdom-mother class of the Anuttarayoga Tantra.

Yogambara is mentioned in the Vajravali Buddhist tantra text by Abhayakaragupta and through the tradition of Marpa and Ngok Loden Sherab.

Semi-wrathful in appearance, he is dark blue in colour, and has three faces, blue, white and red.
