= Dharmabhāṇaka =

Buddhist Dharma teacher

A dharmabhāṇaka (Pali: dhammabhāṇaka; Ch; 說法師, shuofashi; J. seppōshi; T. chos smra ba) is a "Dharma teacher", "preacher" or "reciter of Dharma" in Buddhism.

== Early Buddhism ==
In early Buddhism, when the early Buddhist texts were transmitter orally, the term bhāṇaka referred to a monastic vocation that certain Buddhist monks would undertake. The main job of these monks was to memorize, transmit and teach the sutras and other Buddhist scriptures. Due to the size of the Buddhist canons, dharmabhāṇakas generally specialized in a sub-category of Buddhist texts. For example, Majjhimabhāṇakas memorized Majjhima Nikāya sutras, while Jātakabhāṇakas focused on Jātakas.

According to modern scholars, the "bhāṇaka system" went through several changes after the introduction of writing for the preservation of religious texts. By the late fourth or early fifth century CE, instead of focusing on the memorization of entire collections, bhāṇakas instead became experts in public recitation and doctrinal analysis and interpretation of the sutras.

== Mahāyāna ==
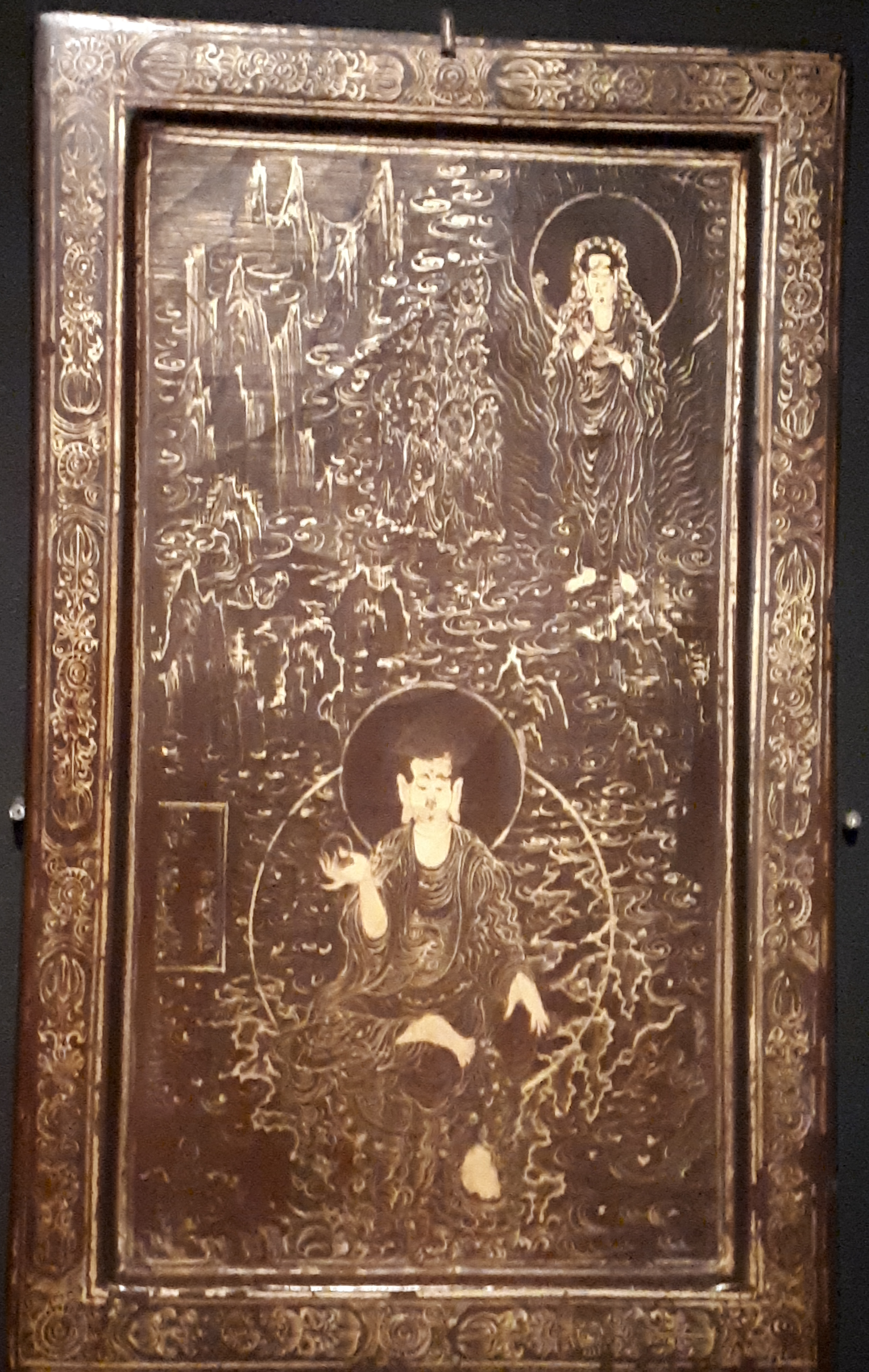
A 1307 Korean painting depicting Sadāprarudita rising in the air (upper right) after learning from Dharmodgata (center).

In Mahāyāna Buddhism, the role of the dharmabhāṇaka became even more central, since they played an important role in the dissemination and promotion of the Mahāyāna sūtras. Indeed, according to David Drewes, dharmabhāṇakas might have been the "primary agents" of the spread of Mahāyāna Buddhism.

Mahāyāna Dharma teachers initially spread Mahāyāna teachings through oral performance and their ability to memorize and eloquently teach Buddhism is highly valued and lauded in numerous Indian Mahāyāna texts. Numerous Mahāyāna sutras depict dharmabhāṇakas as learned individuals who memorize, recite and teach Mahāyāna sutras to their followers who travel together with them. According to Drewes:

They also depict them as people who preach sutras to assemblies in monasteries and towns and in private homes. In their preaching they are depicted as taking questions from audiences, responding to hostile objections, and making an effort to speak in a dynamic, inspiring manner. They are often identified specifically as monks, but some passages obliquely suggest that they may sometimes have been nuns or laypeople. In scenarios predicting that Mahāyāna sutras will be revealed five hundred years after the Buddha’s death, the future revealers of sutras are often identified as dharmabhāṇakas, suggesting that they were often, perhaps typically, the authors of these texts. Dharmabhāṇakas are commonly depicted as choosing to be reborn in this world out of compassion for beings.

As such dharmabhāṇakas don't just memorize and recite the sutras, but they are learned individuals who know how to teach the Dharma well to others, and can analyze, rephrase, elaborate on and interpret the teachings to suit their audiences.

Some Mahāyāna sutras even state that dharmabhāṇakas have attained the state of being irreversible. Many sutras contain stories (jatakas or avadanas) of dharmabhāṇakas, including some who are identified as the past life of a great Buddha like Shakyamuni or Amitayus. Mahāyāna sutras often teach devotion to dharmabhāṇakas and praise them in various ways. For example, the Sarvadharmāpravṛttinirdeśa contains a story about a dharmabhāṇaka that spent his time going from village to village teaching laypeople about the Dharma. The sutra praises this figure as a true Mahayanist, and contrasts him with forest monks who live in seclusion and barely interact with laypersons.

Numerous sutras contain teachings on how to devotedly attend to dharmabhāṇakas. For example, the Ratnamega sutra states:

You should generate the idea that the spot of earth on which the preacher abides is a place of veneration (caitya); you should generate the idea that the preacher is a superior; you should generate the idea that [the preacher] is a good friend; you should generate the idea that the preacher is the teacher of the path. Seeing the preacher, [you should] generate happiness, faith, and jubilation. You should commend the preacher, saying “Wonderful!” repeatedly.

=== Named dharmabhāṇakas ===
Perhaps one of the earliest accounts of a dharmabhāṇaka is in the Aṣṭasāhasrikā Prajñāpāramitā's account of Sadaprarudita bodhisattva. According to the sutra, Sadaprarudita offered his own flesh in order to obtain money to donate to a dharmabhāṇaka called Dharmodgata, who then teaches him Prajñaparamita (the perfection of wisdom). In this story, Dharmodgata takes the role of the kalyāṇamitra, the good spiritual friend who a bodhisattva needs to acquire the Prajñaparamita.

Another dharmabhāṇaka character who is mentioned in various Mahayana sutras is Sarvasattvapriyadarśana (Ch: 衆生憙見). This figure appears in buddha-nature sutras, including the Anūnatvāpūrṇatvanirdeśa, the Mahāparinirvāṇamahāsūtra and the Mahābherīhārakasūtra.

The Sarvadharmāpravṛttinirdeśa, preserved in part within the Schøyen collection, recounts the story of Viśuddhacāritra, a skilled preacher. Upon arriving at a monastery led by the austere Cāritramati—an expert in vinaya but inexperienced in bodhisattva conduct—tensions arise when Viśuddhacāritra and his followers engage in active town preaching, converting countless beings to the path. Displeased, Cāritramati chastises their actions as disruptive and contrary to monastic seclusion, eventually expelling them. However, Viśuddhacāritra resumes his mission elsewhere, and Cāritramati’s judgmental stance leads to his karmic downfall into the Avīci hell. While the narrative reflects a tension between preaching and forest dwelling focused practices, it ultimately validates Viśuddhacāritra's efforts, revealing his eventual attainment of Buddhahood as Akṣobhya. The story suggests a possible historical friction between reformist Mahāyāna preachers and conservative monastics in early Indian Buddhism.

=== Dharmabhāṇakas as Buddha-like ===
The Pratyutpanna Samadhi Sutra teaches that one should follow a dharmabhāṇaka for a period of ten years to even an entire lifetime, treating them as if they were a Buddha and donating one's property to them. Similarly, dharmabhāṇakas are highly lauded in the Lotus Sutra, which sees their status as being like Buddha since they uphold the sutra. Thus, their status is closely connected to the status of Mahayana sutras. In one passage, the Lotus Sutra states of the dharmabhāṇaka:

He carries the Tathagata on his shoulder, Bhaiṣajyarāja, who after having copied this Dharma-paryaya [Dharma discourse] and made a volume of it, carries it on his shoulder. Such a one, wherever he goes, must be saluted by all beings with joined hands, must be honoured, respected, worshipped...

The Lotus Sutra also states that defaming a Dharma teacher is worse than defaming the Buddha. It also predicts that some dharmabhāṇakas will be persecuted in the future. It states that dharmabhāṇakas who preach the Lotus Sutra will see the Buddha and have a favorable rebirth. Furthermore, their bodies will also become more beautiful (like the Buddha's body was) and their will attain supernatural senses and supernatural protection from deities. Since their teaching of the sutra is the Buddha's speech, they should be revered as a Buddha. Other sutras, like the Akṣayamatinirdeśa, also recommend that those who hear a dharmabhāṇaka preach should attempt to see them as a Buddha.

=== The four discriminations ===
According to the Dharmasaṅgīti sūtra, the Daśabhūmika sūtra, and other sources, the true dharmabhāṇakas who have perfected their teaching skill are those who have attained the four discriminations (pratisaṃvid), a set of four qualities widely discussed in Mahāyāna literature which are fully attained in the ninth bodhisattva level (according to the Daśabhūmika). These four are:

1. discrimination of dharma (dharmapratisaṃvid), indicating knowledge of the words, phrases and linguistic forms which is used to teach Dharma
2. discrimination of things / meaning (arthapratisaṃvid), knowledge of what the words are teaching about, the objects of the Dharma teachings
3. discrimination of expression (niruktipratisaṃvid), refers to knowledge of multiple forms of speech and multiple vernacular languages
4. discrimination of eloquence (pratibhānapratisaṃvid), refers to knowledge of "inspired speech" (pratibhāna), which is speech that arises from a special state of mind attained through cultivation and samādhi. It is a self-transcendent state in which the truth of reality is disclosed by the preacher in extemporaneous expressions of the Dharma.

== See also ==
- Vajrācārya
- Bhikkhu
