= Ratnagotravibhāga =

Mahayana text

The Ratnagotravibhāga (Sanskrit, abbreviated as RGV, meaning: Analysis of the Jeweled Lineage, Investigating the Jewel Disposition) and its vyākhyā commentary (abbreviated RGVV to refer to the RGV verses along with the embedded commentary), is an influential Mahāyāna Buddhist treatise on buddha-nature (a.k.a. tathāgatagarbha). The text is also known as the Mahāyānottaratantraśāstra (The Ultimate Teaching of the Mahāyāna). The RGVV was originally composed in Sanskrit, likely between the middle of the third century and no later than 433 CE. (Note: Though Sanskrit versions of the RGV and RGVV are extant, these versions are of later recensions and not truly representative of the original according to the analysis of Takasaki (1966).) The text and its commentary are also preserved in Tibetan and Chinese translations.

The Ratnagotra focuses on the buddha nature present in all sentient beings, which is eternal, blissful, unconditioned and originally pure. This buddha nature is obscured by defilements, but when they are removed, the buddha nature is termed dharmakaya, the ultimate Buddha body. The buddha nature is what is referred to as the "jewel disposition" or "jeweled lineage" (ratnagotra) of the Buddhas. The RGVV often quotes from various tathāgatagarbha sutras and comments on them. The Ratnagotravibhāga is an important and influential text in Tibetan Buddhism and was also important for the Huayan school.

The authorship of the text is uncertain. Chinese sources state it was written by a certain Indian named Suoluomodi 娑囉末底 (or Jianyi 賢慧, Sanskrit reconstruction: *Sāramati) while Tibetan tradition (as well as later Indian sources) state that it was taught by the bodhisattva Maitreya and transmitted via Asanga. Modern scholarship favors the Chinese attribution.

== Titles ==
A Tibetan style Triratna (triple jewel) symbol

=== Ratnagotravibhāga ===
The Sanskrit gotra is a figurative term for family or lineage, while ratna means jewel or precious stone. In Yogacara Buddhism, gotra has the meaning of certain "dispositions" or "innate potential for spiritual achievement" that sentient beings have and which place them in five "families" corresponding to the three vehicles, undefined and icchantikas (deluded hedonists). The Ratnagotravibhāga focuses on the family lineage and inner disposition (gotra) which allows all beings to become Buddhas, and thus is compared to a precious jewel (ratna). This is the unchanging buddha-nature that is present in all beings.

=== Uttaratantraśāstra ===
A secondary title for this work is Uttaratantraśāstra (The Treatise on the Ultimate Teaching) or Mahāyānottaratantraśāstra (The Treatise on the Ultimate Teaching of the Mahāyāna), indicating how it considers itself to be the highest and ultimate teaching of Mahayana Buddhism.

This title has also been translated as Treatise on the Supreme Continuum. Tantra can mean both "doctrine" or "teaching" as well as "continuum". The second way of interpreting the title refers to the fact that buddha-nature is an "everlasting continuum of the mind" (as noted by The 14th Dalai Lama) or a "continuous flow" (as Rongtön Sheja Kunrig and Go Lotsawa gloss the title). This pure continuum may be covered over by fleeting stains, but nevertheless remains as a continuity through many lives and into Buddhahood.

== History ==
A Sanskrit RGVV was brought to China by Ratnamati (勒那摩提) in 508 CE where he translated the text to Chinese. This shows the whole text was available in India in the early 6th century. According to Kazuo Kano, no Indian texts quote the RGVV from the 7th to the 10th century, but it is cited in a significant number of Indian texts from the 11th to the 13th century.

=== Structure and textual layers ===
According to Brunnhölzl, "the text known as RGVV consists of three parts: (1) basic verses, (2) commentarial verses, and (3) prose commentary." Brunnhölzl also notes that most scholars agree that the text is "a compilation of different elements" and they have "made attempts to identify the “original” core verses of the text".

In certain textual transmissions, the Ratnagotravibhāgavyākhyā (RGVV) commentary has become integrated with the RGV verses through the passage of time, even though there are also distinct standalone editions of the RGV and RGVV. Takasaki provided a valuable textual analysis of the Sanskrit critical edition edited by Johnston with those versions preserved in certain editions of the Chinese and Tibetan canon. Takasaki identified a textual core of the RGV with the most ancient verses of this core being extant in the Chinese. Extensive analysis of the critical Sanskrit text edited by Johnston (1950) with the Tibetan and Chinese versions, identified that the verses actually comprise two separate groups: a core set of 27 ślokas and 405 additional or supplementary verses of explication (Skt. kārikā). The work of Takasaki and Johnston has been critiqued by the extensive reviews of such scholars as De Jong and Lambert Schmithausen. Schmithausen disagrees with Takasaki's opinion that the earliest core of the RGV consists of 27 verses and instead opines that "the original RGV is constituted by the totality of basic verses. But this original RGV seems to have made use of several (perhaps only partly remodelIed) older materials."

=== Authorship ===
The text is attributed to the Indian Jianyi (賢慧, Sanskrit reconstruction: *Sāramati or *Sthiramati) in the earlier Chinese tradition, a claim first found in the work of the sixth century scholar Zhiyi.

The Tibetan tradition considers the verse portion to have been composed by the bodhisattva Maitreya and the prose commentary by Asanga. The attribution of both the root verses and commentary to bodhisattva Maitreya is found in some late Indian sources (post 11th century). The discovery of a Sanskrit fragment of the Ratnagotravibhāga in Saka script (dated to the 9th century by Kazuo Kano) which mentions Maitreya bodhisattva as the author of the 'root' (mūla) verses also shows that Central Asian Buddhists also attributed the work to bodhisattva Maitreya. Meanwhile, the Sanskrit manuscript found in Tibet contains no attribution.

Several scholars have suggested that the Chinese and Tibetan traditions may be reconciled if perhaps Sāramati was also given the epithet of "Maitreya" (or if, vice versa, Sāramati was an epithet of the bodhisattva Maitreya), but Kazuo Kano notes that there is no evidence to support this. (Note: Il se peut que quelques-unes des divergences, en principe fondamentales, entre les traditions tibétaines et chinoise au sujet de l'auteur du RGV soient plus apparentes que réeles. Jusqu' ici on a le plus souvent procédé en suposant que la tradition indo-tibétaine qui tient Maitreya pour l'auteur de ce traité est entirècontraire a la tradition sino-indienne sur *Sāramati. Cependant, ne serait-il pas également possible de considérer le nom *Sāramati -- de même que le nom Vyavadāta-samaya dans le colophon du MSA -- comme une épithète de Maitreya ? En effect, dans le Maitreya-prasthāna-sūtra, bLo-gros brtan-po (= Sthiramati, ou quelque nom synonyme comme Dṛḍhamati) a été effectivement mentioneé comme l'appelation sous laquelle Maitreya était connu dans dans une existence antériere. Si le nom mentioné par Fa-tsang et d'autres autorités pouvait alors être considéré comee une epithéte de Maitreya, la divergence entre la tradition rapporté par les docteurs chinois et la tradition indo-tibétaine ne serait plus irréductible.)

According to Karl Brunnhölzl, modern scholars have varying opinions on the authorship of the RGV: "the main positions include a total denial of a historic person named Maitreya, the author of these texts being someone called Maitreya but not the great bodhisattva Maitreya, and these works being composed by Asanga or other persons" The Japanese scholar Takasaki Jikido is certain that the author of the commentary is Sāramati through his comparison of the RGVV with the Chinese translation of the Dharmadhātvaviśeṣaśāstra (Dasheng fajie wuchabie lun 大乘法界無差別論) which is also said to have been authored by the same figure. Jonathan Silk also argues that both texts were by the same author.

Peter Harvey also finds the attribution to Maitreya / Asanga less plausible than the Chinese attribution. According to Shenpen Hookam, most modern scholars favor Sāramati (c. 3rd-4th century CE) as the author.

=== Versions and transmission ===
==== Sanskrit ====
The critical edition of the RGVV in Sanskrit was first published by Johnston, et al. (1950). This critical edition of Johnston is founded on two manuscripts discovered by Rev. Rāhula Sāñkṛtyāyana (1893–1963) in Tibet.

Of the complete extant Sanskrit [Johnston, et al. (1950)], Tibetan and Chinese manuscript versions, recension or interpolations of the text (according to perspective), Takasaki (1966) considered the Chinese translation of a no longer extant Sanskrit text to be the oldest manuscript in existence, though it may not represent the original Sanskrit perfectly.

==== Chinese ====
According to Takasaki (1966: p. 7), the Chinese Canon retains one translation of the RGVV, which is titled Jiūjìng yìchéng bǎoxìng lùn (究竟一乘寶性論, which can be back-translated into Sanskrit as: Uttara-ekayāna-ratnagotra-śāstra). Its Taisho Daizokyo canon location is No. 1611, Vol.31. The work was translated by Ratnamati at Luoyang in 511 CE.

According to Zijie Li, "there are major differences" between the Chinese version of the RGVV and the Sanskrit version. Li writes that "in comparison to the surviving Sanskrit text, the Chinese version of the Ratnagotravibhāga downplays the significance of the expression gotra and instead reflects a strong interest in zhenru 真如 (Skt. tathatā) and foxing 佛性 (Buddha-nature) – for instance, 'zhenru foxing' becomes the foundation or reason for transmigration in the world. In this context, reality (Skt. tathatā) acts like a conditioned dharma, an idea that deeply influenced later understanding of Buddha-nature in East Asian Buddhism."

==== Tibetan ====
Takasaki holds the Tibetan Tanjur to retain two versions of the RGV:

- Theg-pa-chen-po rgyud-bla ma'i bstan-bcos (Mahāyāna-uttaratantra-śāstra), Tohoku Catalogue No. 4024;
- Theg-pa-chen-po rgyud-bla-ma'i bstan-bcos rnam-par-bsad-pa (Mahāyāna-uttaratantra-śāstra-vyākhyā), Tohoku Catalogue No. 4025.

Both of these versions were translated in Srinagar (Kashmir) by Matiprajña (Sanskrit, 1059–1109, also known as Ngok Loden Sherab) under the guidance of Kashmiri Pandits 'Ratnavajra' (Wylie: Rin-chen rdo-rje) and Sajjana, towards the close of the 11th century CE.

Shenpen Hookham affirms that there are precious few records of the RGV or RGVV in India and that their traditional recorded history commences with their 'rediscovery' by the 11th century yogin Maitripa (who was also named Maitreyanātha). According to Hookam, there is no evidence that the work was associated with the bodhisattva Maitreya before the time of Maitripa. However, Klaus-Dieter Mathes has shown that Maitripa's teachers, Jñanasrimitra (980-1040) and Ratnākaraśānti, must have had access to the RGV, RGVV and/or their extracts, since it is quoted and paraphrased in Jñanasrimitra's Sākārasiddhiśāstra and Sākārasamgraha, as well as in Ratnākaraśānti's Sūtrasamuccayabhāṣya.

Tsering Wangchuk has examined the intellectual history of the RGV in Tibet from the 12th century to the early 15th century.

==== English Translations ====
Eugène Obermiller (1901–1935) pioneered the research into the Ratnagotra literature through his translation of the Tibetan RGVV under the name of the Uttara-tantra-shastra in 1931. Obermiller interpreted the text as an example of monism. The verse portion of the RGV has been translated several times into English, including by E. Obermiller (1931) and Rosemary Fuchs (2000).

The English translations by Takasaki Jikido (1966, from Sanskrit, with reference to the Chinese) and Karl Brunnhölzl (2015, from Tibetan) are the only English translations of the complete RGVV, which includes the commentary.

== Doctrinal content ==
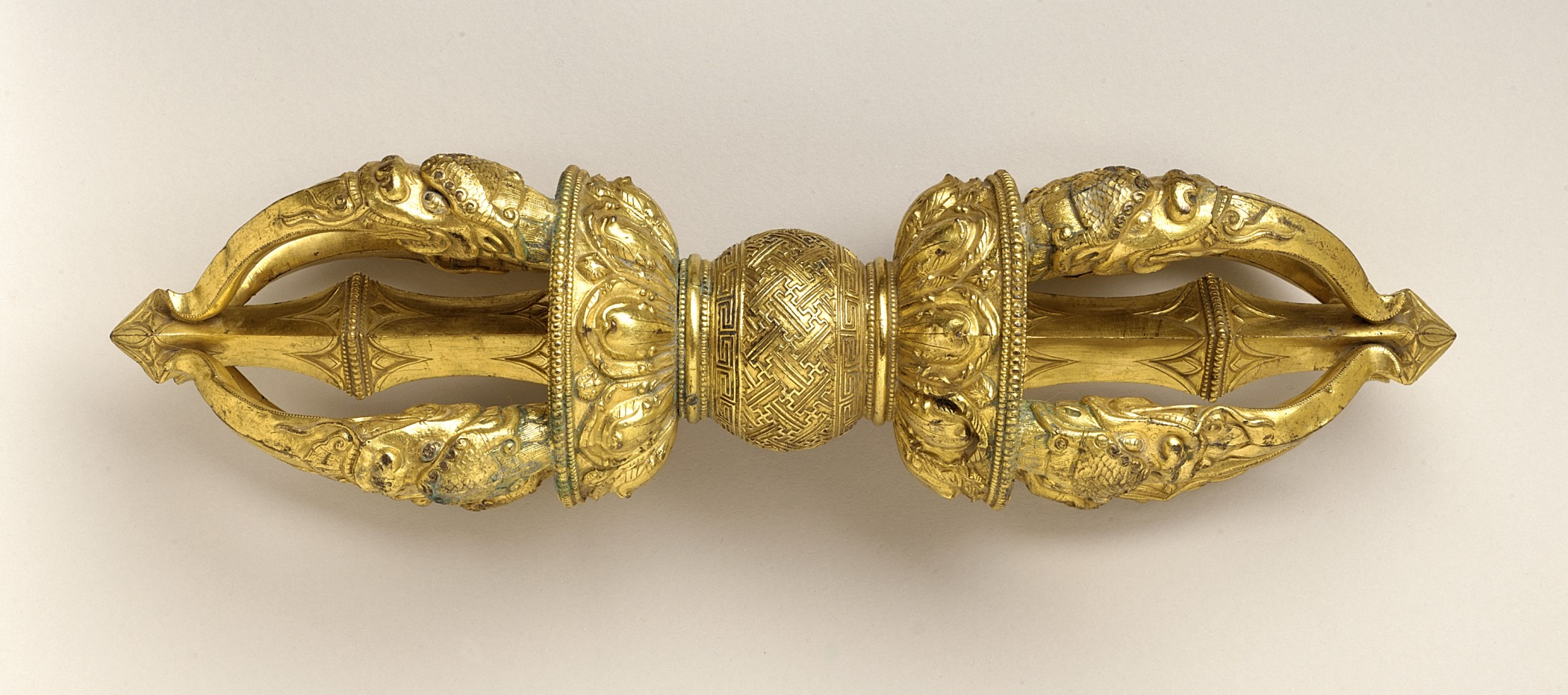
A ritual vajra, a symbol of indestructibility, which is used in the RGV as an image of the adamantine-like permanence of buddha nature.

The text consists of about 430 Sanskrit verses with a prose commentary (vyākhyā) that includes substantial quotations from tathāgatagarbha oriented sutras (amounting to up to one third of the RGVV).

=== The seven vajra topics ===
The RGV structures its doctrinal content through seven main topics, which it calls the seven "vajra points" or "adamantine topics".

These seven topics are:

- Vajra topic one is the Buddha, here described as without beginning, middle and end. Buddha is also described as peace and as the uncompounded (asamskrta), and spontaneous (anabhoga) dharmakāya. The Buddha is further described as self-enlightened and as self-arisen wisdom (jñana) which is "not awakened by a condition other than itself" (aparapratyayabhisambodhi). Buddha is further described as wisdom, compassion and power for the benefit of others.
- Vajra topic two is the Dharma, which is described as cessation. This cessation is described as neither existence nor non-existence. It is a non-conceptual reality, as well as the reality of the path which consists of luminous and stainless jñana that removes all defilement. It is also equated with the dharmakaya and compared to the sun which is unspoiled by clouds and removes all darkness.
- Vajra topic three is the Sangha, meaning those beings who realize: the true luminous nature of the mind (prakrtiprabhasvarata), not-self, the unreality of the defilements, and "the full extent of what is" (yavad bhavikataya) which is seeing their own true nature in all beings (this is also related to compassion). "Sangha" also refers to the supreme qualities that make them a refuge. Bodhisattvas are like the crescent moon moving to the full moon of the Buddha.
- Vajra topic four is the dhātu, i.e. buddhadhātu (buddha-nature), described as the stained suchness (tathata) i.e. the dharmakaya covered over by defilements. This is the "seed of Supramundane Dharma." This topic also teaches bodhicitta and its object, which is the welfare of all sentient beings. According to Brunnhölzl, "since “others” refers to sentient beings as the objects for whose sake bodhicitta is generated, this teaches suchness with stains."
- Vajra topic five is bodhi (awakening), also known as the nirvana-dhātu, i.e. the Buddha's dharmakaya fully uncovered by defilement.
- The sixth vajra topic refers to the buddha qualities (guṇāḥ) which promote the welfare of all beings and are innumerable as the sands of the Ganges. The RGVV compares the dharmakaya to the ocean which contains a vast amount of jewels and water (wisdom and compassion). The RGVV describes various sets of buddha qualities like the ten powers, four fearlessnesses, the eighteen exclusive properties and the 32 marks of a great person.
- The seventh topic is the Buddha activity (karma) which teaches Dharma to all sentient beings. It is an effortless, non-conceptual and spontaneous awakened activity for the good of all. Despite being effortless, it always "acts with perfect appropriateness to the time, place, aspirations, and capacities of beings." Buddha activity is also said to be without end.

The basic relationship among these topics is explained in RGV I.3:

From the Buddha [comes] the dharma and from the dharma, the noble saṃgha.

Within the saṃgha, the [tathāgata] heart leads to the attainment of wisdom.

The attainment of that wisdom is the supreme awakening that is endowed with the attributes such as the powers that promote the welfare of all sentient beings. (RGV I.3)

=== Buddha-nature ===
The Ratnagotravibhāga is notable for its exploration of the doctrine of the buddhadhātu ("buddha nature", "buddha source" or "buddha essence", Chinese: 佛性, pinyin: fóxìng), also called buddhagarbha, jinagarbha and tathāgatagarbha (Wylie: 'de bzhin gshegs pa'i snying po; Chinese: 如来藏 rúláizàng). According to the RGV, all sentient beings have this permanent Buddha element within even though it is covered over by defilements (which are fully absent in a buddha). The buddha-nature is the common element shared by sentient beings, bodhisattvas and buddhas and as the RGV states "all corporeal beings are said to contain a Buddha" (Sanskrit: sarve dehino buddhagarbhāḥ).

The RGV verses describe buddha nature as follows:

Always, by nature, unafflicted; like a clear jewel, the sky, or water; it follows from faith in the dharma, superior insight, concentration and compassion (30); [its] results are the perfected qualities of purity, selfhood, bliss, and permanence, with the functions that are aversion to suffering and the appetite and aspiration for the achievement of peace (35); like the ocean, being an inexhaustible store of treasured qualities, and like a lamp, being naturally conjoined with qualities that are inseparable from it (42). What is taught by those who perceive reality is the distinction between ordinary persons, noble persons and Buddhas in terms of reality (tathatā): hence is it taught that this womb/chamber for a victor exists in sentient beings (sattveṣu jinagarbho ’yaṃ) (45); [depending on whether this reality is] impure, impure yet pure or perfectly pure, it refers to the realm of sentient beings, the bodhisattva or the Tathāgata [respectively] (47). (RGV 1.30, 35, 42, 45, 47).

According to the RGV, this essence or basic element (dhātu) is always present in all beings and is the true essence of every living being and the source of all virtuous qualities, including Buddhahood. The RGV states:

This [dhātu] is of unchanging character, due to its conjunction with inexhaustible qualities; it is the refuge of the world, due to it having no limit ahead of it; it is always non-dual, due to being without discrimination; it is also characterized as indestructible, as its nature is uncreated. (RGV 1.79).

The RGV teaches that buddha nature has three main characteristics: (1) dharmakaya, (2) suchness, and (3) disposition, as well as the general characteristic (4) non-conceptuality.

Regarding the main function of buddha nature, the RGV states that it is what causes sentient beings to seek an escape from samsara, and to aspire to nirvana.

The RGV also describes buddha nature as “the intrinsically stainless nature of the mind” (cittaprakṛtivaimalya). The RGV thus equates the tathāgatagarbha with the luminous mind, stating: "the luminous nature of the mind Is unchanging, just like space." It also describes it as the pure Buddha wisdom (buddhajñāna) which is said to be all pervasive. This all pervasiveness is compared to space that is the same everywhere, whether it is the space within an ugly vase or a beautiful one.

Furthermore, according to the Ratnagotra, there are three reasons why it can be said that all sentient beings have buddha nature: (1) the Buddha's dharmakāya permeates all sentient beings; (2) the Buddha's thusness (tathatā) is omnipresent (avyatibheda); (3) the Buddha's gotra (lineage/disposition) is in all sentient beings.

=== The dharmakāya, the purified buddha nature ===
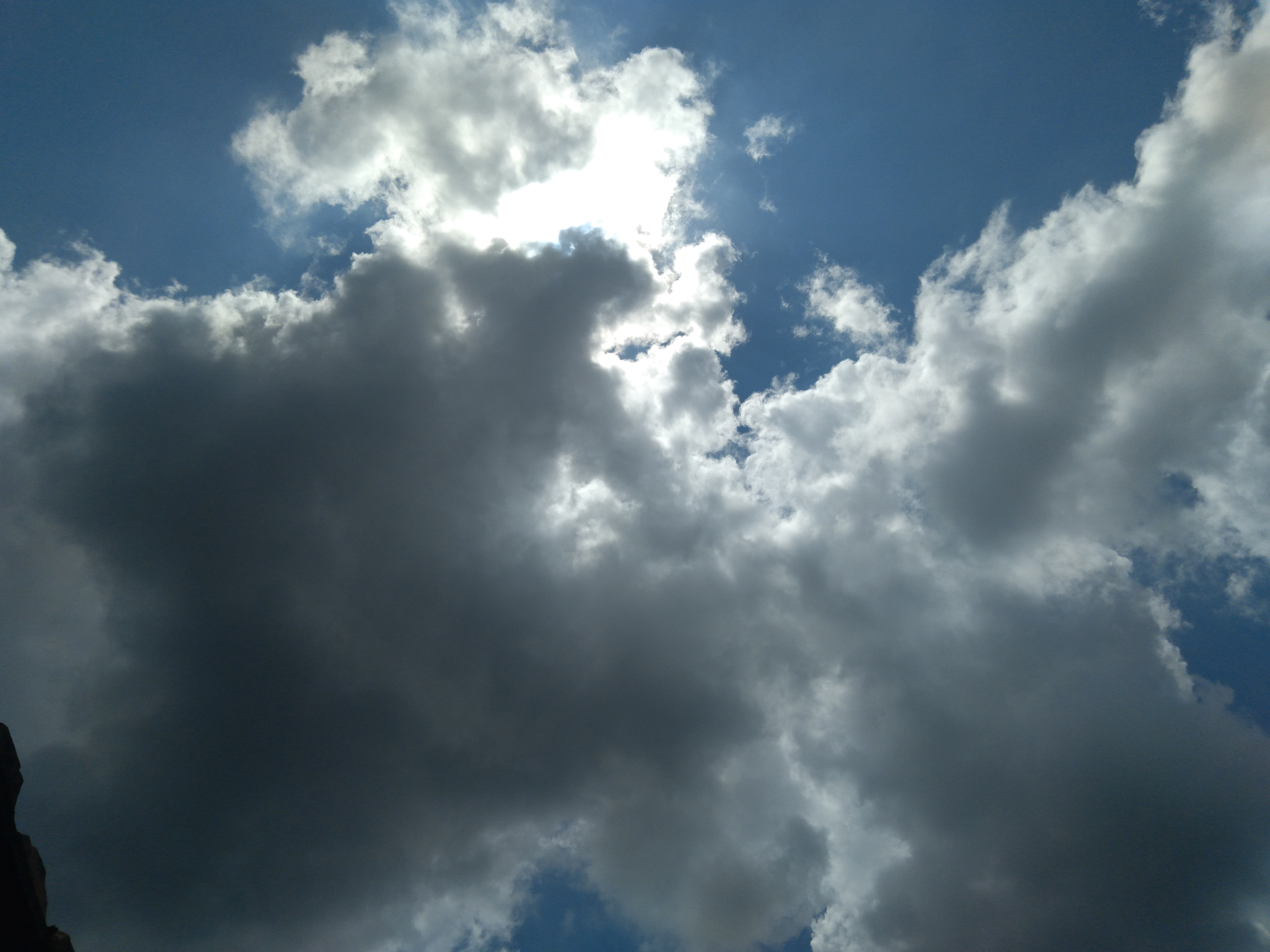
A common simile for buddha nature is the sun, which always shines even when it is obscured by clouds.

The RGV equates buddha nature with dharmakāya, liberation and with the Buddha (the Tathāgata):

Hence [the dhātu] is the dharmakāya; it is the Tathāgata; it is the truth of the noble ones; it is the ultimate liberation (paramārthanivṛtti). Hence, it not being separate from its qualities—in the manner of the sun and its rays—there is no liberation apart from buddhahood. (RGV 1.84)

Thus, in the Ratnagotravibhāga, buddha-nature is ultimately the same as the dharmakāya (the ultimate buddha body, the 'body' of ultimate reality). (Note: most exalted nature of the Buddha) While the tathāgatagarbha is enclosed in the defilements, the dharmakāya is the same phenomenon free of the defilements. This is compared to how the sun (dharmakāya) is not tainted by clouds (defilements), only obscured by them. The dharmakāya is held to be originally pure (prakṛtipariśuddha), unconditioned (asaṃskṛta), unborn (ajāta), unarisen (anutpanna), eternal (nitya), changeless (dhruva), and permanent (śāśvata). These elevated qualities make also elevate the Buddha to a supreme status that is worthy of extensive devotion.

=== The four perfected qualities ===
An important schema in which the RGVV (as well as buddha nature sutras like the Śrīmālādevī Siṃhanāda) present the dharmakāya (the buddha nature freed of defilement) is through its four perfected qualities (guṇapāramitā) of eternity (nitya), bliss (sukha), Self (ātman) and purity (śuddha). These qualities are described as results (phala) of the tathāgatagarbha. The four qualities are also explained as being reversals of the four misperceptions (viparyāsā), that is, perceiving samsaric phenomena as being pure, self, blissful and unchanging. The RGVV explains that when applied to samsaric phenomena, these are indeed misperceptions, but when applied to the dharmakaya, they are actually correct perceptions.

The four perfect qualities are said to be revealed through four “causes of purification” (śuddhihetu). These are the ways in which the tathāgatagarbha can be “cleansed” to reveal the dharmakāya, and they are: (1) faith in the dharma (dharmādhimukti), (2) superior insight (adhiprajñā), (3) concentration (samādhi), and (4) compassion (karuṇā).

Furthermore, the RGVV also lists various obstructions to the path, such as hostility to the dharma, false views of the self (ātmadarśana) and indifference to sentient beings. The RGVV makes it clear that the dharmakāya as “supreme self” (paramātman), is not the self of the non-buddhists or a self amid the five aggregates, but rather is something that is realized after understanding the absence of self in all phenomena (dharmanairātmya). The RGVV echoes the Prajñāpāramitā sutras by stating that the right view is to let go of all views and it even states that all affirmative statements about the Buddha’s self ultimately refer to the absence of self. However, as Jones notes, the earlier Chinese version of the RGVV instead states that ātman as "absence of self" means absence of "erroneous notions of selfhood to which non-Buddhists remain attached" and it also states that ātman can refer "to the achievement of a “powerful” or “sovereign” self (zizaiwo 自在我)."

=== The four inconceivables ===
According to RGV (RGV 1.24, 1.25) there are four points about buddha nature which are inconceivable:

1. The buddha nature is pure and yet it is also associated with afflictions.
2. Awakening has never been defiled and yet it also becomes purified (at the moment of realization).
3. The Buddha qualities (of buddha nature) are inseparable (from the basic buddha element in all beings). The Buddha wisdom is in all sentient beings, but it does not manifest because of their defilements.
4. Buddha activity is spontaneous, effortless, unlimited and non-conceptual.

The RGVV is clear that only high level bodhisattvas and Buddhas can realize the true meaning of these.

=== Why all beings have buddha nature ===
The RGV gives three widely quoted reasons why "all sentient beings always possess the buddha nature":

Because the Perfect Buddha body (buddhakaya) radiates, because the Tathata (Suchness) is inseparable,

Because the gotra (disposition, lineage) is present, all beings have the essence (garbha) of Buddha.

Because Buddha wisdom (buddhajñana) is present in the mass of beings, because the stainless nature (svabhava) is non-dual,

Because the Buddha gotra is named after its fruit, it is taught that all beings have the Buddha Essence (garbha).

=== Why buddha nature is taught ===
The Ratnagotravibhāga also seeks to explain the relationship between the emptiness teachings and the buddha nature teaching. According to the RGV, buddha nature is taught because there are "five defects" which can only be remedied by this teaching.

The five defects are:

- The depressed mind or faintheartedness, that is, feeling inadequate and unable to aspire to Buddhahood. Buddha nature teachings provide confidence to those who feel like this.
- Contempt for inferior sentient beings - knowing that all beings are of the lineage of the buddhas corrects the arrogance of some bodhisattvas.
- Attachment to what is unreal - this refers to beings who think that their faults and defilements are their true nature.
- Criticism of the real dharma or denial of what is real - this refers to those who overlook the fact that all beings have the buddha wisdom within and thus do not know the truth.
- Excessive self-cherishing and not loving others as one's self - when one knows that all beings have the buddha nature one naturally identifies with other beings as if they are oneself.

C.V. Jones also argues that these five defects show that the Buddha-nature teaching is seen as a corrective by the RGV to the view that only teaches emptiness or to certain miscomprehensions about emptiness.

=== Emptiness and buddha nature ===
The RGV also uses the term "empty" to refer to how the buddha nature is empty of defilements, however it also claims that buddha nature is not empty of its innate buddha qualities:

There is nothing to be removed from it and nothing to be added. The real should be seen as real, and seeing the real, you become liberated. The [buddha] element is empty of adventitious [stains], which have the defining characteristic of being separable; but it is not empty of unsurpassable qualities, which have the defining characteristic of not being separable. (RGV I.157-58)

To support this, the commentary quotes the Śrīmālādevī Siṃhanāda which states that "Buddha nature is empty of the sheath of all defilements, which are separable and recognized as something disconnected. It is not empty of inconceivable buddha qualities, which are inseparable..."

=== The supreme teaching ===
The secondary title for this work, Uttaratantraśāstra, highlights the text's claim that buddha-nature teachings represent the final, definitive and highest (Sanskrit: uttara) teachings (tantra) of the Buddha, in contrast to the earlier teachings on emphasizing emptiness, such as those contained in the Prajñāpāramitā sutras.

The Uttaratantra claims that its teachings include and yet go beyond the Prajñaparamita doctrine of emptiness. It emphasizes a more positive metaphysical doctrine than the apophatic emptiness teachings. The Uttaratantra sees this cataphatic teaching as complementary to the Prajñaparamita emptiness teaching. Since the Uttaratantra claims its teachings as supreme, it holds that without this teaching, the emptiness of Prajñāpāramitā remains an incomplete teaching that must be completed by the higher and final (uttara) teaching of buddha nature.

== Exegesis and influence ==
=== Indian tradition ===
Various commentaries were written on the RGVV, some by Indian Sanskrit authors. The three Indian works on the RGVV which have been preserved are:

- Mahāyānottaratantraśāstropadeśa (Pith Instructions on Mahāyānottaratantraśāstra, Tibetan: theg pa chen po'i bstan bcos rgyud bla ma'i man ngag), a synopsis of the RGVV by Sajjana which "outline a contemplative system based on the seven vajra points."
- Mahāyānottaratantraśāstraṭippanī, a short commentary by Vairocanarakṣita which provides some glosses on RGVV terms
- A full commentary by Ratnavajra

Late Indian Buddhist scholars like Jñānaśrīmitra (fl. 975-1025 C.E.), Ratnākaraśānti (c. 10th-century CE) and Jayānanda (late 11th – early 12th century) also cited and commented on passages of the RGV.

Jñānaśrīmitra interprets the RGV teaching of buddha nature in line with his sākāravada yogacara view which holds that the Buddha-body is represented by images (ākāras) that exist ultimately. According to his interpretation of the three bodies (trikaya) doctrine, the sambhogakaya and its accompanied true image (ākāra) is the ultimate reality that truly exists, and the dharmakaya is a conventional quality of the sambhogakaya. For Jñānaśrīmitra, the buddha nature is the emptiness of this ultimate reality, i.e. the sambhogakaya, and this emptiness is synonymous with dharmakāya and dharmadhātu.

Ratnākaraśānti disagrees with this view, since for him it is the dharmakāya (which lacks any images or forms) that is the ultimate reality, and this gives rise to the saṃbhogakāya as its outflow (niṣyanda). Ratnākaraśānti does accept the existence of a unchangeable pure nature which resides in some sentient beings, as is taught in the RGV. However he also equates buddha-nature with the Yogacara theory of bodhisattvagotra, and thus, for him, only those beings that have the disposition to become a bodhisattva have buddha-nature. This is said to be rare and thus he does not accept that all beings have buddha nature. According to Brunnhölzl, Ratnākaraśānti also equates buddha nature with the perfected nature and argues that it is empty of both the imaginary and the dependent natures. Brunnhölzl sees this as an Indian precedent for the Shentong view.

Maitripa, a student of both Jñānaśrīmitra and Ratnākaraśānti, is closely associated with the RGV by the Tibetan tradition, though he wrote no work on it and only quotes it twice in his corpus.

Meanwhile, the Kashmiri pandit Jayānanda sees buddha-nature as a way of attracting inferior people and as a provisional teaching (as stated in the Lankavatara sutra).

=== Tibetan tradition ===
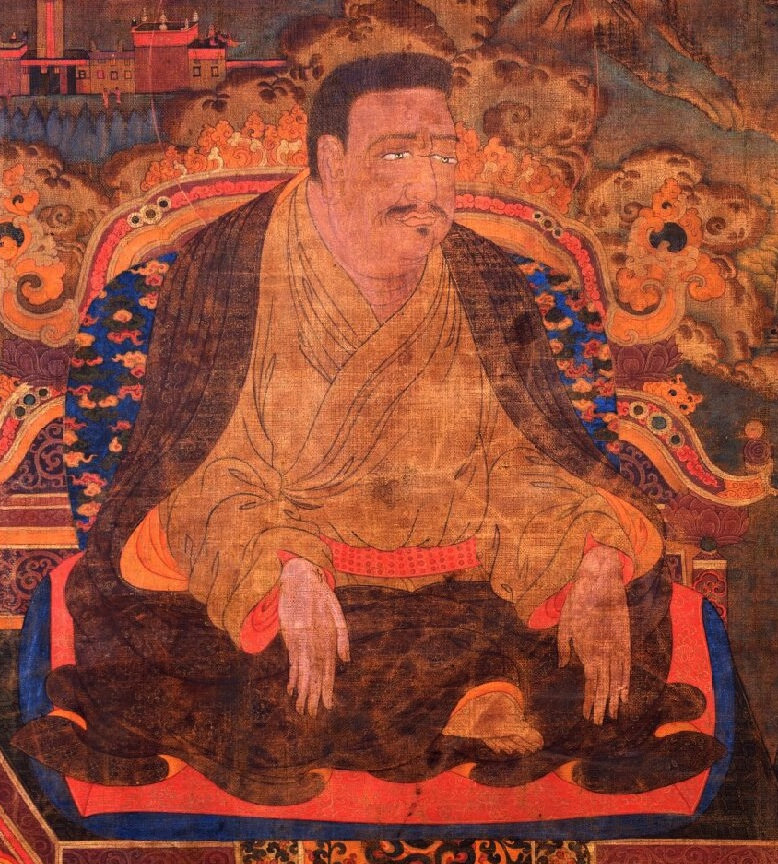
Lotsawa Marpa Chokyi Lodro, (1012-1097), a student of Maitripa.

An early Tibetan commentary is A Commentary on the Meaning of the Words of the “Uttaratantra”. This text claims to preserve the teachings of Marpa Lotsawa on the RGV and may have been compiled by a student of Marpa Dopa Chökyi Wangchuk (1042 - 1136, a student of Marpa Lotsawa and Rongzom). The text contains Mahamudra like meditation instructions as well as more scholarly material that draws on Yogacara thought. It also often makes use of Dzogchen terminology like kadag (original purity) and rigpa.

Another important commentary is Dashi Oser's (15th-16th century) Heart of the luminous sun, which is based on the Third Karmapa's (1284–1339) topical outline of the RGV. Other notable Tibetan exegetes of the Ratnagotravibhāga have been Ngok Loden Sherab, Dolpopa Sherab Gyaltsen, Gö Lotsawa Zhönnu-pel, Gyaltsab Je, Mikyö Dorje (8th Karmapa), Jamgon Kongtrul and Jamgon Ju Mipham Gyatso.

Various interpretations and understandings of the RGVV have developed in Tibetan Buddhism, such as the view that buddha-nature is a non-implicative negation (influenced by Madhyamaka), the Shentong (empty of other) view and the Dzogchen view.

==== Buddha nature as a nonimplicative negation ====
Various Tibetan Buddhist scholars (especially those of the Gelug and Sakya schools) follow the RGVV tradition of Ngok Loden Sherab which "identifies the tathagatagarba as the factor of the natural purity of all phenomena, which pervades all knowable objects and is a space-like nonimplicative negation." This interpretation generally understands buddha-nature to be just a term for emptiness as it is explained in the Madhyamaka treatises of Nagarjuna and Candrakirti. These authors see emptiness and buddha nature as the lack of an independent nature in all phenomena.

==== Shentong ====
According to the Shentong view, buddha nature refers to "the naturally pure wisdom, luminous by nature, that pervades [everyone] from buddhas to sentient beings." This non-dual Buddha wisdom is empty of defilements and samsara (what is other than wisdom), but it is not empty of its own nature. As such, it is an "implicative negation", that is, a negation which implies that there is something (that is, wisdom) that remains after analyzing what buddha nature is not. Shentong is associated with figures like Dolpopa, Mikyo Dorje, 8th Karmapa and Jamgon Kongtrul.

==== The Nyingma Dzogchen view ====
In the Dzogchen system of the Nyingma school, the three jewels of Sangha, Dharma and Buddha are identified as the three vajras (body, speech and mind). According to Namkhai Norbu, the three vajras along with the Buddha qualities and Buddha activities, constitute the 'continuum' or Mindstream of either a sentient being (with adventitious obscurations) or a buddha (without adventitious obscurations). In Dzogchen, buddha nature, the 'everlasting' continuum, is often explained as the unity of "primordial purity" (Wylie: ka dag) and "natural perfection" or "spontaneous presence" (lhun grub). (Note: Sanskrit:Samatājñāna) An important Dzogchen doctrinal view on buddha-nature (also called sugatagarbha) is how it explains it in terms of the 'basis' (gzhi) and its three aspects: 'essence' (i.e. purity, emptiness), 'nature' (rang bzhin, i.e. natural perfection) and 'compassionate energy' (thugs rje). (Note: This triune is indivisible and iconographically represented by the Gankyil.) (Note: Scheidegger, Daniel (2007: p.27): Certainly, the main characteristic of what is named “lamp” (sgron ma) can be circumscribed as “inseparability of clarity and emptiness” (gsal stong dbyer med). Thus, it is that which makes itself clear (gsal ba) — i.e., that which actualizes itself in and as visionary experience of form, colour, sound, etc., — without losing its quality of being empty of any concreteness. In other words, it is the inseparability of the empty essence (ngo bo stong pa) and the clear nature (rang bzhin gsal ba) of the ground (gzhi) in and as all-pervading compassion (thugs rje kun khyab) as it manifests outwardly in visionary experience. Of course, the term “manifest outwardly” (phyi snang) should not be taken too literally, rather, it should be understood as a projection^{¿} of the “inner” luminosity (nang gsal) of the ground which forms the innermost part or “heart“ (tsitta [an alternate orthographic rendering of citta (sanskrit)]) of man into a seemingly Outer Space (phyi’i dbyings). Useful in this context is the picture of the Youthful-Vase-Body (gzhon nu bum pa’i sku). When the outer wall of this body which symbolizes the ground in its “inner” potentiality, is broken through, its “inner” light is seen in the “Outer Space”. Obviously, the term “Outer Space” (phyi’i dbyings) does not refer to some kind of “science-fiction like outer space”, but means that the ground is making room for itself in and as experienceable plenum. Moreover, the term “lamp” (sgron ma) also implies a bodily presence. It is the ground present in the concrete givenness of an individual being and thus, it is similar to the tathagatagarbha of the general Mahayana Buddhism. Source: (accessed: Saturday May 9, 2009))

The Nyingma commentary of Ju Mipham from a Dzogchen view has been rendered into English by Duckworth (2008). Khenchen Namdrol Rinpoche (2008/2009) commenced the Rigpa Shedra teachings on Mipham's view of Buddha Nature which has been followed by Khenpo Dawa Paljor (2009) of Rigpa Shedra's oral word by word commentary of Ju Mipham's exegesis of RGV in Tibetan with English translation.

=== East Asia ===
The Chinese RGVV remains lesser known in East Asian Buddhism. No commentaries on it were written in Chinese and thus scholars have assumed it was less influential than other Buddha nature works. However, the RGVV was an important work for the southern Dilun school of Ratnamati and was also highly esteemed by Fazang (法藏 643-712), a key patriarch of the Huayan school. According to Zijie Li, Fazang's theories of zhenru 真如 (Skt. tathatā), Huayan xingqi (華嚴 性起 Arising of nature on Huayan) and zhongxing 種姓 (Skt. gotra) thoroughly relies on the RGVV.

The RGVV also impacted other East Asian scholars, traditions and texts, including Paramārtha 真諦 (499-569), the Mahayana Awakening of Faith (Dasheng qixin lun 大乘起信論), the Sanjie school (三階教), Wonhyo 元曉 (617-686) and the Japanese authors Juryō (寿霊) and Chikei (智憬) of Nara Japan (710-784).

== See also ==
- Luminous mind
- Tathagatagarbha (Buddha-nature)
- Rangtong-Shentong

== Sources ==
- Brunnhölzl, Karl (2015). When the Clouds Part: The Uttaratantra and Its Meditative Tradition as a Bridge between Sutra and Tantra. Shambhala Publications. ISBN 978-0-8348-3010-3.
- Buswell, Robert; Lopez, Donald S. (2013). The Princeton Dictionary of Buddhism. Princeton University Press. ISBN 978-0-691-15786-3.
- Hookham, S.K. (1991). The Buddha within : Tathagatagarbha doctrine according to the Shentong interpretation of the Ratnagotravibhaga. Albany, NY: State University of New York Press. ISBN 978-0791403587.
- Jones, C.V. (2020). The Buddhist Self: On Tathāgatagarbha and Ātman. University of Hawaii Press.
- Mathes, Klaus-Dieter (2008). A Direct Path to the Buddha Within: Gö Lotsāwa's Mahāmudra Interpretation of the Ratnagotravibhāga. Wisdom Publications.
- Nugteren, Albertina (2005). Belief, Bounty, And Beauty: Rituals Around Sacred Trees in India. BRILL. ISBN 90-04-14601-6.
- Ruegg, D. Seyfort (2009). "The Meanings of the Term Gotra and the Textual History of the Ratnagotravibhāga". Bulletin of the School of Oriental and African Studies. 39 (2): 341–363. doi:10.1017/S0041977X00050047. S2CID 145730901.
- Takasaki, Jikido (1966). A Study of the Ratnagotravibhāga (Uttaratantra): Being a Treatise on the Tathāgatagarbha Theory of Mahāyāna Buddhism, Including a Critical Introd., a Synopsis of the Text, a Translation from the Original Sanskrit Text, in Comparison with Its Tibetan & Chinese Versions, Critical Notes, Appendixes and Indexes. Instituto italiano per il medio ed estremo oriente.
- Williams, Paul (2008). Mahayana Buddhism: The Doctrinal Foundations. Routledge. ISBN 9781134250561.
