= Śrīmālādevī Siṃhanāda Sūtra =

Sutra in Mahāyāna Buddhism

The Śrīmālādevī Siṃhanāda Sūtra (traditional Chinese: 勝鬘師子吼一乘大方便方廣經, Lion’s Roar of Queen Śrīmālā) is one of the main early Mahāyāna Buddhist texts belonging to the Tathāgatagarbha sūtras that teaches the doctrines of Buddha-nature and "One Vehicle" through the words of the Indian queen Śrīmālā. After its composition, this text became the primary scriptural advocate in India for the universal potentiality of Buddhahood.

== History ==
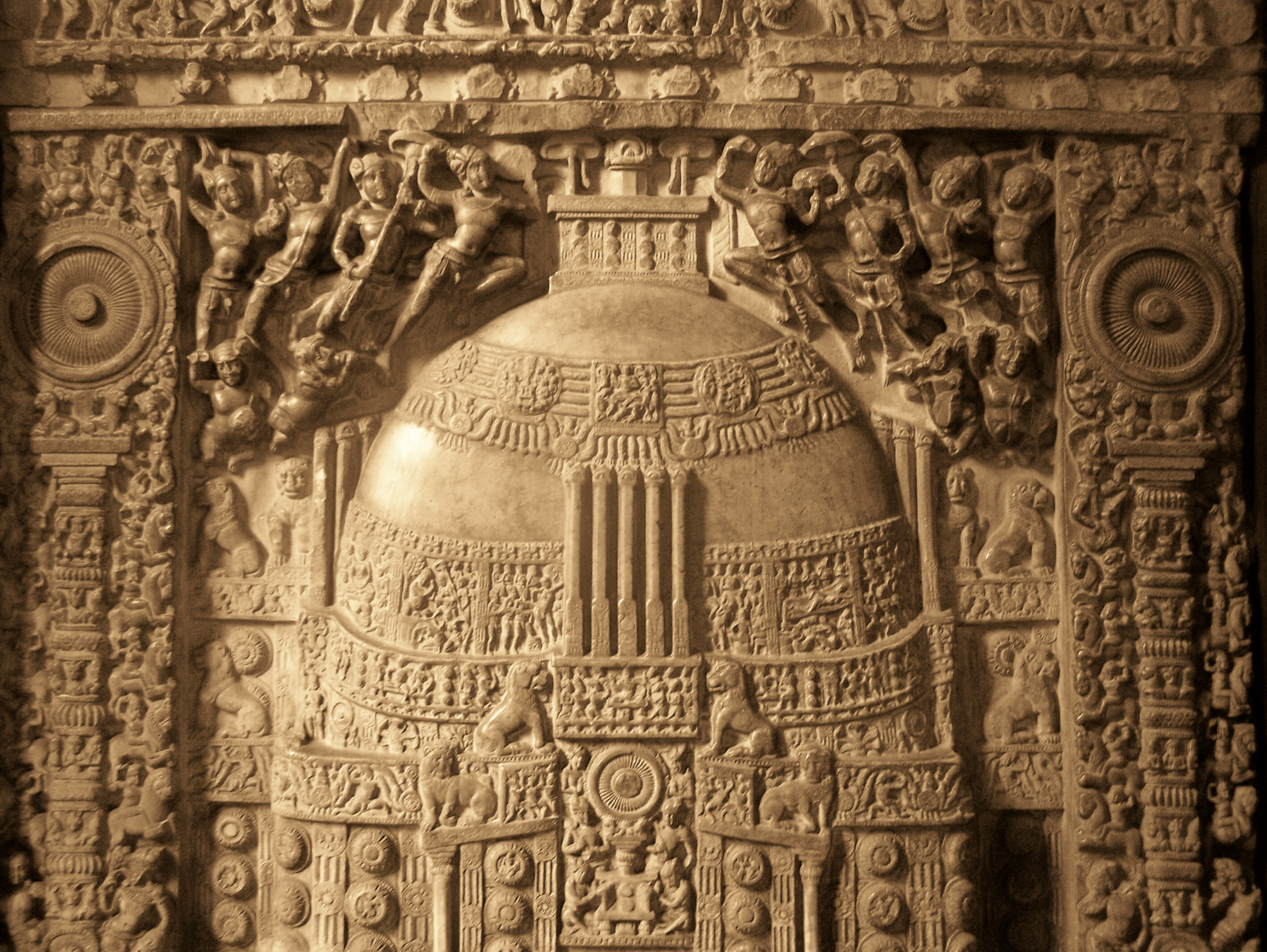
Relief image of the Great Stupa at Amaravati in Andhra Pradesh, India

Brian Edward Brown, a specialist in Buddha-nature doctrines, writes that the composition of the Śrīmālādevī Siṃhanāda Sūtra occurred during the Īkṣvāku Dynasty in the 3rd century CE as a product of the Caitika schools of the Mahāsāṃghikas. Alex Wayman has outlined eleven points of complete agreement between the Mahāsāṃghikas and the Śrīmālā, along with four major arguments for this association. Anthony Barber also associates the earlier development of the Tathāgatagarbha Sūtra with the Mahāsāṃghikas, and concludes that the Mahāsāṃghikas of the Āndhra region were responsible for the inception of the Buddha-nature doctrine. In the 6th century CE, Paramārtha wrote that the Mahāsāṃghikas revere the sūtras that teach the Buddha-nature doctrine.

== Translations ==
The Śrīmālādevī Siṃhanāda Sūtra was translated to Chinese in 436 CE by Guṇabhadra (394-468) and later by Bodhiruci (672-727). A complete Sanskrit original is no longer extant, but extensive quotations are found in the Sanskrit text of the Ratnagotravibhāga as well as some recently discovered fragments conserved in the Schøyen Collection. It was later translated into English by Alex and Hideko Wayman as The Lion's Roar of Queen Srimala.

== Content ==
The Śrīmālādevī Siṃhanāda Sūtra teaches the reality of an ultimate, immaculate consciousness within each living being, which is the Buddhic "Dharmakāya" (essence of Truth), which is yet temporarily sheathed in obscuring defilement. This Dharmakāya, when viewed as intrinsically free from spiritual ignorance, is said to constitute eternity, bliss, the self, and purity in their perfect state. The use of the word "self" in this sutra is in a way unique to this class of sutra. The great Queen Śrīmālā, who according to this text is empowered by the Buddha to teach the Dharma, affirms:

[T]he Dharmakāya of the Buddha has the perfection of permanence, the perfection of pleasure, the perfection of self, the perfection of purity. Whatever sentient beings see the Dharmakāya of the Tathagāta that way, see correctly. Whoever see correctly are called the sons of the Lord born from his heart, born from his mouth, born from the Dharma, who behave as manifestation of Dharma and as heirs of Dharma.

The scripture, which was extremely influential by way of clarification of the Tathagātagarbha view of Śūnyatā, insists that the ultimately correct understanding of emptiness is that the Tathāgatagarbha is empty of all knowledge that is not liberation, whereas, in contrast, the qualities which characterise a Buddha are not empty of inconceivable virtues. An alternative title offered by the Buddha for this sutra expresses this idea of an ultimate meaning to the emptiness doctrine: "The True Revelation of the Buddha's Intention when Teaching Emptiness."

The sūtra has, furthermore, significantly contributed to the Mahāyāna notion of the permanent, steadfast and eternal Tathagātagarbha, which is nothing less than the perfect Dharmakāya temporarily concealed by (ultimately unreal) mental contaminants:

“The tathāgatagarbha is without any prior limit, is nonarising, and is indestructible, accepting suffering, having revulsion toward suffering, and aspiring to nirvana. O Lord, the tathāgatagarbha is not a substantial self, nor a living being, nor ‘fate,’ nor a person. The tathāgatagarbha is not a realm for living beings who have degenerated into the belief of a substantially existent body or for those who have contrary views, or who have minds bewildered by emptiness.

== See also ==
- Aṅgulimālīya Sūtra
- Anunatva-Apurnatva-Nirdesa
- Ātman (Buddhism)
- Mahāyāna Mahāparinirvāṇa Sūtra
- Purity in Buddhism
- Shōmangyō Gisho (an annotated Japanese version of the sutra)

== Sources ==
- Barber, Anthony W. (2009), Buddhism in the Krishna River Valley of Andhra, NY: State Univ of New York
- Brown, Brian Edward (1994), The Buddha Nature. A Study of the Tathagatagarbha and Alayavijnana, Delhi: Motilal Banarsidass Publishers
- Hodge, Stephen (2006), "On the Eschatology of the Mahaparinirvana Sutra and Related Matters". (PDF), lecture delivered at the University of London, SOAS
- McRae, John; Paul, Diana (2004), The Sutra of Queen Śrīmālā of the Lion's Roar and the Vimalakīrti Sutra (PDF), Berkeley, CA: Numata Center for Buddhist Translation and Research, ISBN 1886439311, archived from the original (PDF) on 2017-02-28
- Tola, Fernando; Dragonetti, Carmen (2004), Being As Consciousness: Yogācāra Philosophy of Buddhism, Delhi: Motilal Banarsidass, ISBN 8120819675
- Wayman, Alex and Hideko (1990), The Lion's roar of Queen Srimala, New York: Columbia University Press

== Bibliography ==
- Paul, Diana (1979). 'The Concept of Tathāgatagarbha in the Śrīmālādevī Sūtra (Sheng-Man Ching)'. Journal of the American Oriental Society 99 (2), 191–203
- Mark Dennis (trans.). Prince Shōtoku's Commentary on the Śrīmālā-sūtra, Berkeley, Numata Center for Buddhist Translation and Research 2011. ISBN 978-1-886439-43-6
- King, Richard (1995). Is "Buddha-Nature" Buddhist? Doctrinal Tensions in the Śrīmālā Sūtra: An Early Tathāgatagarbha Text, Numen 42 (1), 1-20
