= Anūnatvāpurnatvanirdeśa =

The Anūnatvāpūrṇatvanirdeśaparivarta (AAN, Sanskrit, The Chapter on the Teaching of Neither Deficiency Nor Fullness), also known as the Sutra of Non-increase and Non-decrease (Chinese: 不增不減經) is a short Mahayana text belonging to the tathāgatagarbha class of Mahayana sutras. The main topic of the sutra is the nature of the Buddhist cosmos (the "realm of sentient beings", Skt. sattvadhātu) and its relationship with ultimate reality (dharmakāya, tathāgatagarbha, etc).

== History ==
The AAN is only extant in the Chinese translation (Ch. Fóshūo bù zēng bù jiǎn jīng, 佛説不増不減經, Taisho no. 16) produced by Bodhiruci (6th century) at Luoyang circa 520 CE. The Tibetan tradition is unaware of this sutra.

The sutra does not survive in Sanskrit in full, however many passages from it survive as quotations in the Ratnagotravibhāga.

The AAN is also quoted in another independent Indian source, the *Mahāyānadharmadhātunirviśeṣa (Dasheng fajie wuchabie lun 大乘法界無差別論, T. 1626 and T. 1627). This treatise may have been another work of *Sāramati (the author of the Ratnagotravibhāga according to the Chinese tradition).

According to Silk, the AAN, while difficult to date, "must be older than the early fifth century" since it "clearly predates the Ratnagotravibhāga". He also argues that "given its doctrinal standpoint and style of presentation, I believe that it post-dates the Tathāgatagarbha-sūtra and Śrīmālādevī."

According to Karl Brunnhölzl, this sutra is notable for its doctrinal similarity to the Śrīmālādevī Sutra. Other scholars also note a close relationship between the teachings of the Anūnatvāpurnatvanirdeśa and other buddha-nature sutras like the Mahāparinirvāṇasūtra and the Tathāgatagarbhasūtra.

Three Chinese commentaries were written on the AAN (by Saichō, Wŏnhyo, and 榮業 (unknown author)), but none of them survive.

An English translation and analysis of the AAN was published by Jonathan Silk in 2015.

== Main teachings ==
=== The One Realm (ekadhātu) ===
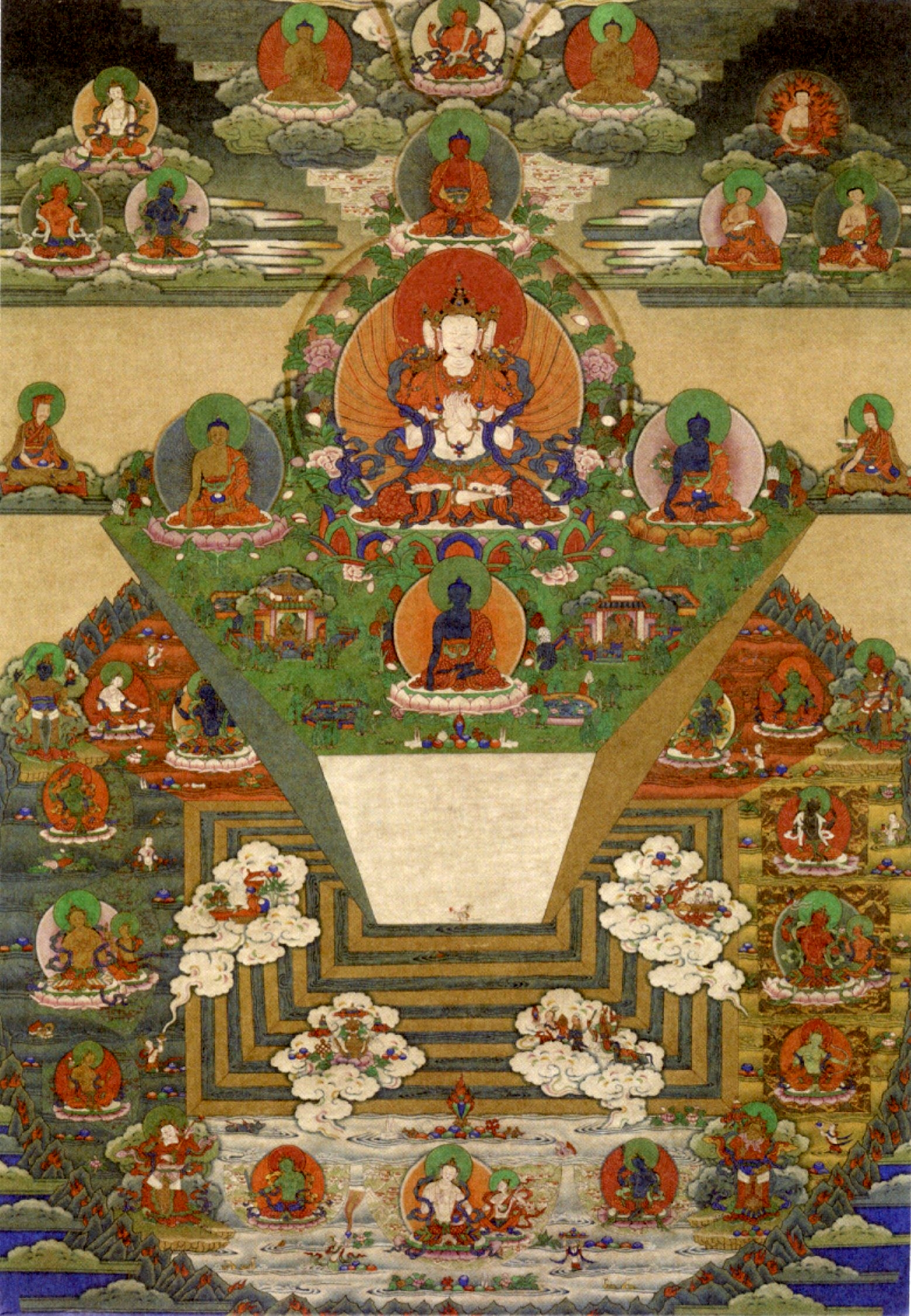
Bhutanese thangka (cloth painting) depicting the Buddhist cosmos pervaded by Buddhas and bodhisattvas, c. 19th century.

The first part of the AAN outlines various wrong views (mithyā-dr̥ṣṭi) which prevent sentient beings from obtaining knowledge of the ultimate truth. The second part of the text discusses the ultimate truth, the most important doctrinal element here being the absence of "decrease or increase" in the "realm of sentient beings" (Sanskrit: sattvadhātu, which is defined in the sutra as "the mass of beings, the ocean of beings"). This means that the overall number of living beings never increases nor decreases, despite all the things which happen and despite the fact that some sentient beings attain Buddhahood.

The Sutra of Non-increase and Non-decrease explains that this is because there is only a one realm or domain, a single element of beings, the ekadhātu (Ch: 一界), also termed the *ekadharmadhātu (一法界). This one domain is identical to both Buddhahood (i.e. the nirvāṇa-dhātu) and saṃsāra (the realm of cyclical suffering, i.e. sattvadhātu), both of which are non-dual and indivisible. The sutra plays on the different meanings of the term dhātu, which can mean ‘realm’, ‘element,’ ‘quintessence,’ ‘essential core’ and even 'cause'. According to Silk, in the AAN, the term dhātu has at least a bivalent sense, referring to both a "realm" (i.e. the cosmos) and a "quintessence" (the intrinsic or central constituent of something).

According to the AAN, neither sentient beings, disciples or solitary Buddhas can know this ultimate reality directly, they can only access it through faith. As the sutra states:

This extremely profound purport is exactly the Tathāgatha’s sphere of insight and it is the range of the Tathāgata’s mind. Śāriputra, such a profound purport as this cannot be known by the insight of all the auditors and lone buddhas, cannot be seen, cannot be examined. Still how much less could all foolish common people fathom it. It is indeed only the insight of the buddhas and tathāgatas which can examine, know and see this purport. [Despite] the insight possessed by all auditors and lone buddhas, Śāriputra, with respect to this purport, they can only have faith; they are not able to know, see or examine it in accord with reality. (Silk, 2015, pp. 89-92)

The sutra goes on to equate this single reality with the ultimate truth (paramārtha-satya), with buddha-nature (tathāgatagarbha), with the Dharmakaya (Dharma body of the Buddha) and with the “originally pure mind” (prakṛtipariśuddhacitta). This is the principal doctrine of the sutra, which states:

The extremely profound purport, Śāriputra, is precisely the supreme truth. The supreme truth is precisely the quintessence of beings (衆生界; sattvadhātu). The quintessence of beings is precisely the embryo of the tathāgatas (如來藏; tathāgatagarbha). The embryo of the tathāgatagas is precisely the dharma-body (法身; dharmakāya). (Silk, 2015, p. 65).

These teachings are an important source for the fourth vajra topic of the Ratnagotravibhāga, which quotes the Sutra of Non-increase and Non-decrease.

=== The wrong views of increase and decrease ===
Furthermore, according to the sutra, thinking that there is increase or decrease in the dhātu (domain, element, realm) of sentient beings (as well as thinking that nirvana is annihilation) is a serious misconception that leads sentient beings to continue to wander in samsara. As Karl Burnnholzl explains:

the root of such misconceptions is their lack of understanding the oneness of the nondual dharmadhātu. This dharmadhātu is the sphere and the great nirvāṇa of buddhas, which cannot be perceived even by śrāvakas and pratyekabuddhas, let alone ordinary beings. Still, buddhas, bodhisattvas, and sentient beings are not different in essence since they are nothing but three different states of the dharmakāya in terms of its being more or less unobscured by adventitious stains. The dhātu of sentient beings is ultimate reality and the tathāgata heart, which is also identified as the dharmakāya, fully endowed with the inseparable, innumerable, and inconceivable qualities of a buddha, just as the radiance, color, and shape of a jewel are inseparable.

As such, in this sutra, the Buddha states that the ideas of increase or decrease in the number of beings in the cosmos are both ill-conceived. If the number of sentient beings decrease (when someone attains nirvana), then this indicates nirvana is a kind of annihilation that leads to non-existence. Meanwhile, if the number of sentient beings increases, this would mean that beings or nirvana can arise (utpāda) without a cause or can be created. Both of these views are rejected by the sutra. According to the Buddha in this sutra, if one understands the true nature of the one realm, the ultimate reality, then neither of these wrongs views of increase or decrease would arise.

=== Buddha-nature and the buddha-qualities ===
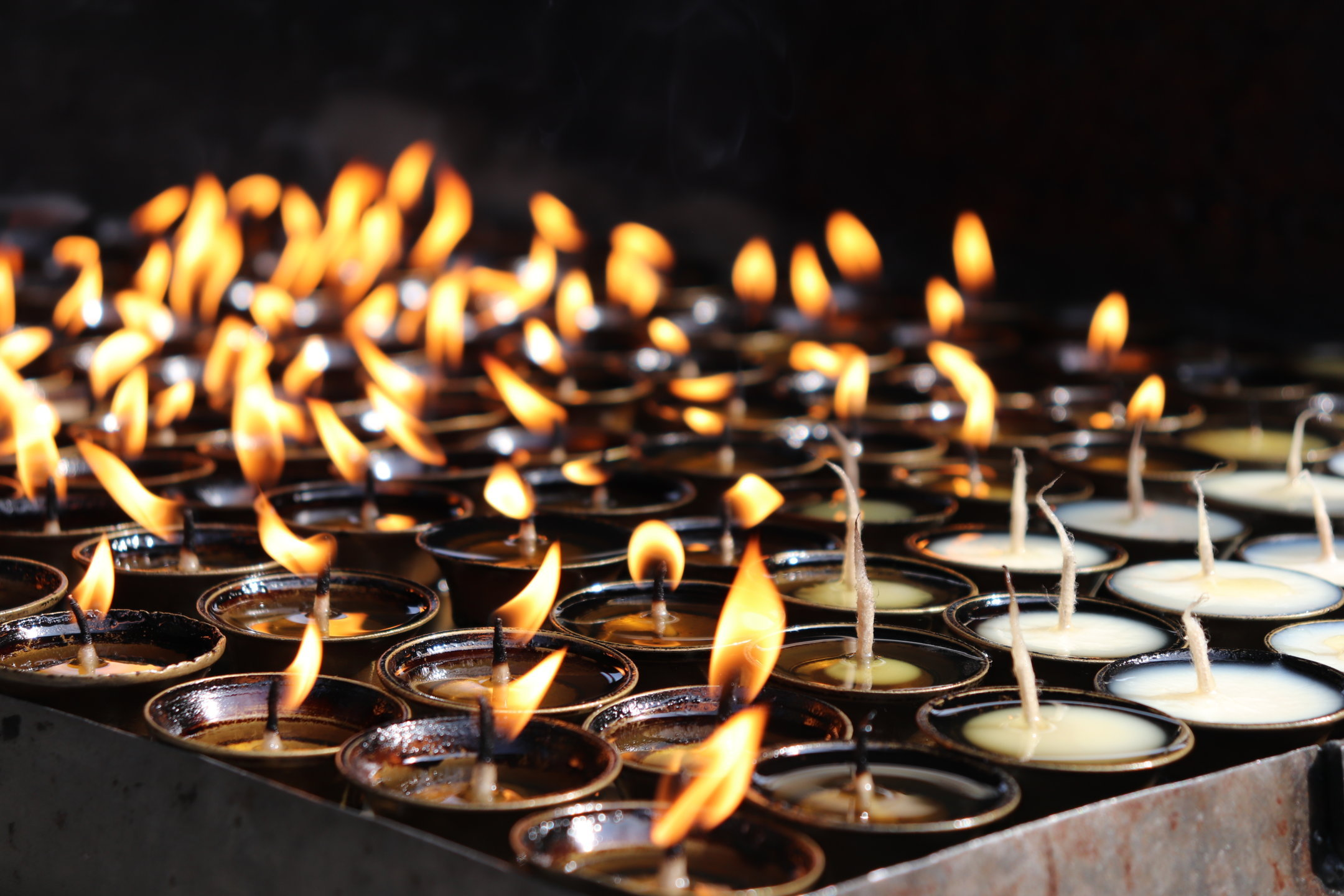
Buddhist butterlamps at Swayambhu. The example of the inseparable nature of a lamp and its light is used to explain the indivisibility of buddha-nature with buddha qualities and wisdom

According to this sutra, nirvana is not utter vacuity or the cessation of being, but is the realm of the Tathāgatagarbha (i.e. buddha-nature), the unfabricated, utterly pure and everlasting essence of all beings. This ultimate reality (paramartha) is also said to be endowed with the wisdom and qualities of the buddhas. The Sutra of Non-increase and Non-decrease states:

As I have expounded, Śāriputra, the meaning of the dharma-body is inseparable from, indivisible from, not cut-off from, not different from the inconceivable qualities definitive of a buddha, greater in number than the sands of the Ganges, [namely,] the merits and insight of a tathāgata. It is like a lamp, Śāriputra, whose brightness, color and tactile sensation are inseparable and indivisible [from the lamp itself]. Again, it is like a maṇi gem whose characteristics of brightness, color and form are inseparable and indivisible [from the gem itself]. (Silk, 2015, pp. 96-98 §11, 12)

This idea is an important source for the Ratnagotravibhāga's fifth vajra point, and this text quotes the Sutra of Non-increase and Non-decrease on this topic. Thus, the buddha qualities (gunas) and wisdom (jñana) and the buddha-nature - dharmakaya are inseparable. This inseparability is exemplified in the sutra with the examples of a light (aloka) and a precious gem (mani), both of which became influential similes in the Mahayana tradition. In Chinese Buddhism, this doctrine was interpreted in terms of essence-function (ti 體 and yong 用).

According to the Sutra of Non-increase and Non-decrease, the buddha-nature - dharmakaya is also the eternal ground or basis of all things or dharmas (phenomena). The dharmakaya is also described by the sutra as "being unborn [anutpada] and unperishing", "free from a time of birth", "free from a time of perishing", "permanent" (nityo), "immutable" (dhruvo), "inexhaustible", "constant", "tranquil" (śivo), "non-dual", "uncreated", and "unchangeable" (śāśvato).

=== Types of beings and the one dharmadhātu ===
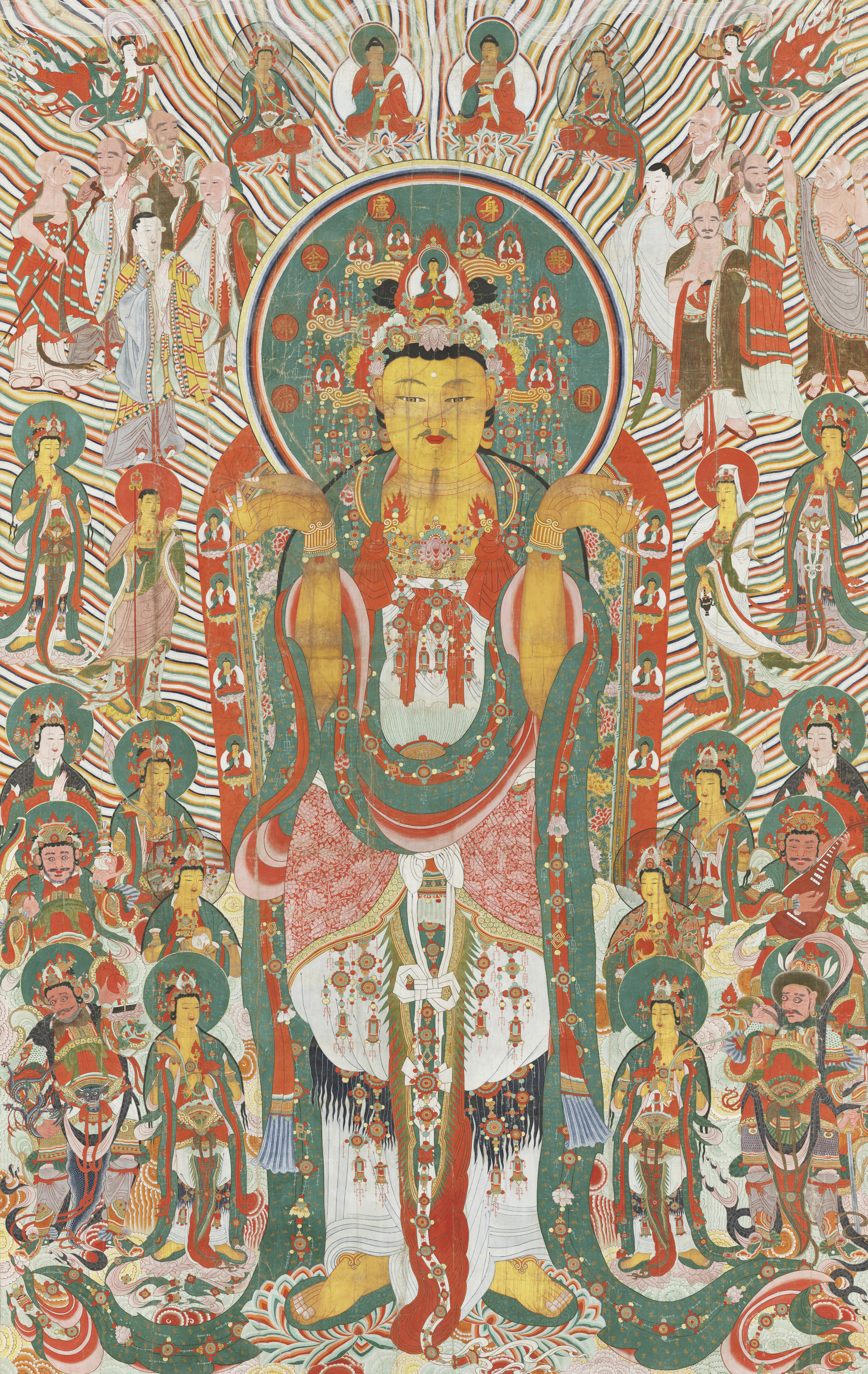
Buddha surrounded by bodhisattvas and other beings, painting at Sinwonsa temple, Gongju, South Korea.

The dharma-body, the ultimate reality, is also said to be that which is “hidden within a sheath of countless defilements” and which undergoes rebirth in saṃsāra. As such, the Tathāgatagarbha or the naturally pure mind, while covered in a cocoon of adventitious defilements (āgantukakleśa), is primordially linked with all awakened qualities (buddha-guṇa) and remains permanently untainted by the defilements.

According to the AAN, there are three ways the single reality manifests, which according to Silk are "nothing more than modalities of the embryo of the tathāgatas, variously related to ultimate Reality":

- Ordinary sentient beings: when the dharmakaya is "ensnared by limitless defilements greater in number than the sands of the Ganges, drifting on the waves of the world from beginningless ages, comes and goes through birth and death”.
- Bodhisattvas, which refers to when the dharmakaya "repels the anguish and suffering of birth and death in the world, banishes all desires, practices the ten perfections, collects the eighty-four thousand teachings, and cultivates the practices leading to bodhi".
- Buddhas, described in the AAN as follows: “This very dharma-body, thoroughly freed of all sheaths of defilements, having transcended all sufferings, the stains of all defilements vanished, well and truly pure, fixed in the Absolute Reality that is ultimately pure, risen to the stage looked forward to by all beings, having attained peerless heroic strength with respect to all spheres of knowledge, perfected in sovereign power over all things free of all hindrances and unobstructed."

As such, buddhas, bodhisattvas and sentient beings are not different in terms of their essential nature (their only difference is in the relative state of the covering defilements) and are all therefore not ultimately subject to increase or decrease. The sutra also stresses the non-duality of the ultimate reality (the dharmakāya) and the world of sentient beings (the sattvadhātu) when it states: "not separate from the sattvadhātu is the dharmakāya, not separate from the dharmakāya is the sattvadhātu. The sattvadhātu of beings is precisely the dharmakāya, the dharmakāya is precisely the sattvadhātu." (Silk, 2015, p. 112 (§15ii)). As Silk writes, for the AAN, the dharmakaya is "the fundamental, unitary ground of all existence, in which ordinary beings then appear as the defiled, transient aspect of the unitary and real existence."

According to Silk, the view that "all of reality is unitary" is the key to the vision of the AAN. While there are three different aspects or modalities of this unitary reality, they are all one realm, a single essence, which is the common ground for all things. It is only due to the adventitious defilements that this inherent unity is not seen by some. This "cosmic unity" which holds that there is one single reality has been termed a type of monism by Jonathan Silk. Christopher Jones similarly writes that this sutra is defending an "absolute principle," which is the dharmakāya filled with buddha qualities. All living beings, and all of reality, are merely modes of this absolute reality which also represents "the common nature possessed by all beings". Jones also adds that for the AAN, the single dharma realm is explained "both in the sense of a common nature shared by all sentient beings, and in the sense of a single realm of existence to which all sentient beings belong."

== See also ==
- Tathāgatagarbha sūtras
- Buddha-Nature
- Mahayana Mahaparinirvana Sutra
- Purity in Buddhism

== Bibliography ==
- Brunnhölzl, Karl (2014). When the Clouds Part, The Uttaratantra and Its Meditative Tradition as a Bridge between Sutra and Tantra. Boston & London: Snow Lion.
- Silk, Jonathan A. (2015). Buddhist Cosmic Unity. An Edition, Translation and Study of the Anunatvapurnatvanirdesaparivarta (PDF). Hamburg University Press. ISBN 9783943423228. Archived from the original on 2015-10-16.
- Jones, C.V. "Beings, Non-Beings, and Buddhas: Contrasting Notions of tathāgatagarbha in the Anūnatvāpūrṇatvanirdeśaparivarta and *Mahābherī Sūtra". JOCBS. 2016(5): 53-84
- Shiu, Henry. "The Nonduality of Nonconceptual Wisdom and Conceptual Cognition: A Study of the Tathāgatagarbha Teaching in the Anūnatvāpūrṇatvanirdeśa-parivarta." PhD diss., University of Toronto, 2005.
