= Ngok Loden Sherab =

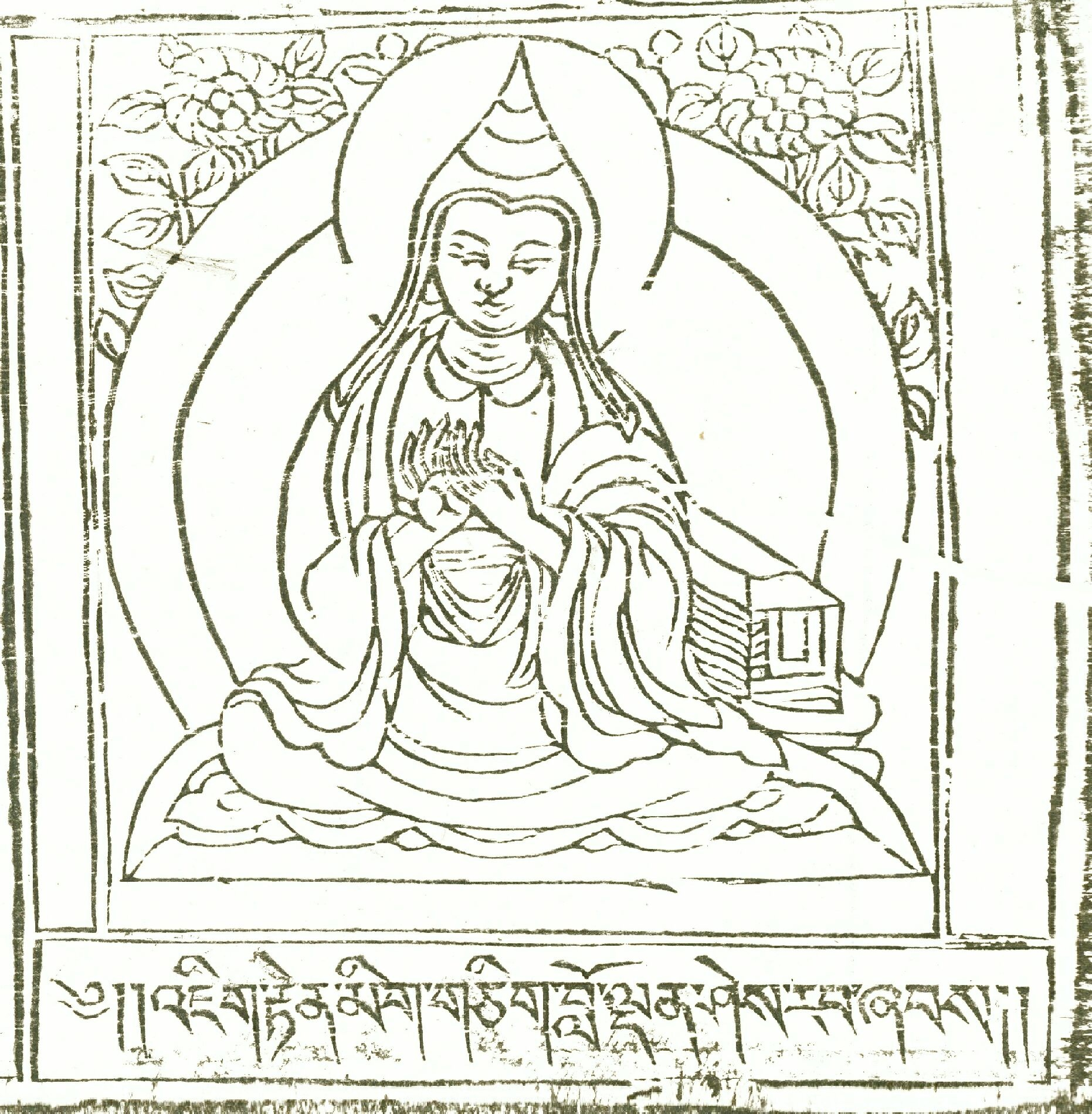
Ngok Loden Sherab

Ngok Loden Sherab or Ngok Lotsawa Loden Sherab (Tibetan: རྔོག་ལོ་ཙཱ་བ་བློ་ལྡན་ཤེས་རབ, Wylie: rngog lo ts'a ba blo ldan shes rab) (1059–1109) - Important in the transmission of Buddhism from India to Tibet. One of the most renowned translators in Tibetan history and traditionally known as one of the "Ten Pillars of Tibetan Buddhism" (ka chen bcu). Also known as Matiprajna (Sanskrit).

== Translations ==
=== Tibetan Tanjur ===
Two versions of the Ratnagotravibhāga were translated by Loden Sherab at Srinagar in Kashmir under the supervision of Kashmiri Pandits Ratnavajra and Sajjana towards the close of the 11th century CE:

- Theg-pa-chen-po rgyud-bla maḥi bstan-bcos (Mahāyāna-uttaratantra-śāstra), Tohaku Catalogue No. 4024
- Theg-pa-chen-po rgyud-bla-maḥi bstan-bcos rnam-par-bsad-pa (Mahāyāna-uttaratantra-śāstra-vyākhyā), Tohaku Catalogue No. 4025.
