= Tathāgatagarbha sūtras =

Set of Mahayana Buddhist texts

The Tathāgatagarbha sūtras are a group of Mahayana sutras that present the concept of the "womb" or "embryo" (garbha) of the tathāgata, the Buddha. Every sentient being has the possibility to attain Buddhahood because of the tathāgatagarbha.

This concept originated in India but was a major influence in the development of East Asian Buddhism, where it was equated with the concept of Buddhadhātu, "Buddha-element" or "Buddha-nature".

The Tathāgatagarbha sūtras include the Tathāgatagarbha Sūtra, Śrīmālādevī Siṃhanāda Sūtra, Mahāyāna Mahāparinirvāṇa Sūtra and the Aṅgulimālīya Sūtra. Related ideas are in found in the Laṅkāvatāra Sūtra and Avataṃsaka Sūtra. Another major text, the Awakening of Faith, was originally composed in China, while the Mahāyāna Mahāparinirvāṇa Sūtra was considerably extended in China.

Comparing the tradition of Tathāgatagarbha sūtras to the Yogachara and Madhyamaka schools, Paul Williams writes that this collection appears to have been less prominent in India, but became increasingly popular and significant in Central Asian Buddhism and East Asian Buddhism.

== Nomenclature and etymology ==
The Sanskrit term tathāgatagarbha (traditional Chinese: 如来藏; pinyin: rúláizàng; Japanese: にょらいぞう; Korean: 여래장; Vietnamese: như lai tạng) may be parsed into tathāgata "the one thus gone" (referring to Buddhahood) and garbha "root, embryo, essence".

== Development of the concept ==
=== Luminous mind in the Nikāyas ===
In the Anguttara Nikāya, the Buddha refers to a "luminous mind". (Note: The reference is at A I, 8-10.)

The canon does not support the identification of the "luminous mind" with nirvanic consciousness, though it plays a role in the realization of nirvana. Upon the destruction of the fetters, according to one scholar, "the shining nibbanic consciousness flashes out of the womb of arahantship, being without object or support, so transcending all limitations."

=== Tathagatagarbha and Buddha-nature ===
Though the tathagatagarbha and the Buddha-nature do not have exactly the same meaning, in the Buddhist tradition they became equated. In the Angulimaliya Sūtra and in the Mahāyāna Mahāparinirvāṇa Sūtra the terms "Buddha-nature" (Buddha-dhātu) and "tathāgatagarbha" are synonyms.

All are agreed that the tathāgatagarbha is an immortal, inherent transcendental essence or potency and that it resides in a concealed state (concealed by mental and behavioural negativities) in every single being, even the worst - the icchantika.

Although attempts are made in the Buddhist sutras to explain the tathāgatagarbha, it remains ultimately mysterious and allegedly unfathomable to the ordinary, unawakened person, being only fully knowable by perfect Buddhas themselves.

The tathāgatagarbha itself needs no cultivation, only uncovering or discovery, as it is already present and perfect within each being:

An unknown treasure exists under the home of a poor person that must be uncovered through removing obstructive dirt, yielding the treasure that always was there. Just as the treasure already exists and thus requires no further fashioning, so the matrix-of-one-gone-thus [i.e. the tathāgatagarbha], endowed with ultimate buddha qualities, already dwells within each sentient being and needs only to be freed from defilements.

Charles Muller comments that the tathagatagarbha is the mind's original pure nature and has neither a point of origination nor a point of cessation: 'tathagatagarbha expresses the already perfect aspect of the original nature of the mind that is clear and pure without arising or cessation.'

The tathāgatagarbha is the ultimate, pure, ungraspable, inconceivable, irreducible, unassailable, boundless, true and deathless quintessence of the Buddha's emancipatory reality, the very core of his sublime nature.

== List of sutras ==
=== According to modern scholarship ===
Michael Radich provides the following list of key Indian sutras associated with Tathāgatagarbha:

- Tathāgatagarbha Sūtra (Buddha Womb Sutra, c. 200-250 CE)
- Śrīmālādevī Siṃhanāda Sūtra (Lion's Roar of Queen Srimala, 3rd century CE)
- Anūnatvāpurnatvanirdeśa (The Teaching on the Absence of Increase and Decrease)
- Mahābheri Sūtra (Great Dharma Drum Sutra)
- Mahāmegha Sūtra (Great Cloud Sutra)
- Aṅgulimālīya Sūtra (Angulimala Sutra)
- Mahāyāna Mahāparinirvāṇa Sūtra (Great Final Nirvana Sutra, c. 200 CE), very influential in Chinese Buddhism
- Laṅkāvatāra Sūtra (Descent into Lanka Sutra, 3rd century CE), integrating Tathāgatagarbha and Yogachara.

A similar and related sutra which synthesizes Buddha-nature with Yogacara is the Ghanavyūha Sūtra.

=== In the Tibetan tradition ===
Karl Brunnhölzl, drawing on the Tibetan tradition, provides the following list of 24 sutras "explicitly or implicitly associated with tathagatagarbha":

1. Tathāgatagarbhasūtra
2. Anūnatvāpurnatvanirdeśa
3. Śrīmālādevī Siṃhanādasūtra
4. Dharanisvararajasutra
5. Mahāyānamahāparinirvāṇasūtra
6. Aṅgulimālīyasūtra
7. Mahābherīsūtra
8. Laṅkāvatārasūtra
9. Tathāgatagunajñanacintyavisayavataranirdesasutra
10. SarvaBuddhavisayavatarajñanalokalamkarasutra
11. Ratnadārikāsūtra
12. Mahāmeghasūtra
13. Abhidharmamahāyānasūtra
14. Sthirādhyāsayaparivartasūtra
15. Avikalpapravesadharani
16. Sunyatanamamahasutra
17. Buddhāvataṃsakasūtra
18. Ratnakuta
19. Suvarnaprabhasottamasutra
20. Saṃdhinirmocanasūtra
21. Gaganagañjaparipṛcchsūtra
22. Sāgaramatiparipṛcchāsūtra
23. Prasantaviniscayapratiharyanamasamadhisutra
24. Candrapradipasutra

== Overview of major sutras ==
=== Tathāgatagarbha Sūtra (200-250 CE) ===
The Tathāgatagarbha Sūtra presents the tathāgatagarbha as a virtual Buddha-homunculus, a fully wisdom-endowed Buddha, "a most victorious body ... great and indestructible", inviolate, seated majestically in the lotus position within the body of each being, clearly visible only to a perfect Buddha with his supernatural vision. This is the most "personalist" depiction of the tathāgatagarbha encountered in any of the chief Tathāgatagarbha sutras and is imagistically reminiscent of Mahāyāna descriptions of the Buddha himself sitting in the lotus posture within his own mother's womb prior to birth: "luminous, glorious, gracious, beautiful to see, seated with his legs crossed" and shining "like pure gold ..."

=== Śrīmālādevī Siṃhanāda Sūtra (2nd century CE) ===
Some of the earliest and most important Tathāgatagarbha sūtras have been associated by scholars with certain early Buddhist schools in India.

Brian Edward Brown dates the composition of the Śrīmālādevī Siṃhanāda Sūtra to the Andhra Ikshvaku in the 3rd century CE, as a product of the Mahāsāṃghikas of the Āndhra region. Wayman has outlined eleven points of complete agreement between the Mahāsāṃghikas and the Śrīmālā, along with four major arguments for this association.

Sree Padma and Anthony Barber also associate the earlier development of the Tathāgatagarbha Sūtra with the Mahāsāṃghikas, and conclude that the Mahāsāṃghikas of the Āndhra region were responsible for the inception of the Tathāgatagarbha doctrine. According to the Śrīmālādevī Siṃhanāda Sūtra, the tathāgatagarbha is "not born, does not die, does not transfer, does not arise. It is beyond the sphere of the characteristics of the compounded; it is permanent, stable and changeless." Moreover, it has been described as "the sphere of experience of the Tathāgatas [Buddhas]."

=== Mahāyāna Mahāparinirvāṇa Sūtra (c. 200 CE) ===
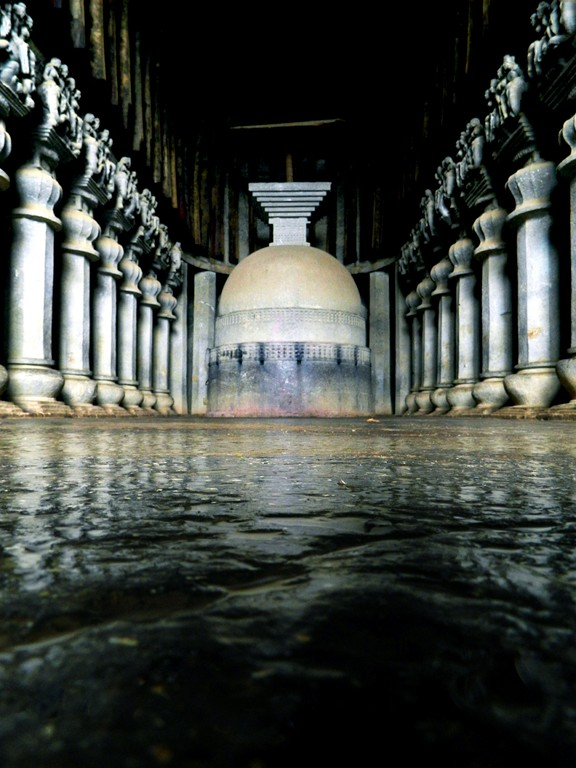
Cave complex associated with the Mahāsāṃghika sect. Karla Caves, Mahārāṣtra, India

The Nirvana Sutra is an eschatological text. Its core was written in India in a time which was perceived as the age in which the Buddha-dharma would perish, and all the Mahayana sutras disappear. The sutra responds to this awaited end with the proclamation of the tathagatagarbha, the innate Buddhahood present in all man.

According to Sallie B. King, the Mahaparinirvana Sutra does not represent a major innovation, and is rather unsystematic, which made it "a fruitful one for later students and commentators, who were obliged to create their own order and bring it to the text". According to King, its most important innovation is the linking of the term Buddhadhātu with tathāgatagarbha.

Buddhadhātu, "Buddha-nature", "the nature of the Buddha", that what constitutes a Buddha, is a central topic of the Nirvana sutra. According to Sally King, the sutra speaks about Buddha-nature in so many different ways, that Chinese scholars created a list of types of Buddha-nature that could be found in the text. The "nature of the Buddha" is presented as a timeless, eternal "Self", which is akin to the tathāgatagarbha, the innate possibility in every sentient being to attain Buddhahood and manifest this timeless Buddha-nature. This "hidden treasury" is present in all sentient beings:

[the Buddha] expounds the doctrine that this quality [of the hidden interior, wondrous treasury] is not only common to buddhas but to all living beings as well.

This does not mean that sentient beings are at present endowed with the qualities of a Buddha, but that they will have those qualities in the future. It is obscured from worldly vision by the screening effect of kleshas, tenacious negative mental afflictions. The most notable of which are greed, hatred, delusion, and pride. Once these negative mental states have been eliminated, however, the Buddhadhātu is said to shine forth unimpededly and the Buddhadhātu can then be consciously "entered into", and therewith deathless Nirvana attained:

[T]he tathagatagarbha is none but Thusness or the Buddha Nature, and is the originally untainted pure mind which lies overspread by, and exists in, the mind of greed and anger of all beings. This bespeaks a Buddha Body that exists in a state of bondage.

=== Anunatva Apurnatva Nirdeśa ===
The development of the Buddha-nature doctrine is closely related to that of Buddha-matrix (Sanskrit: tathāgatagarbha). In the Anunatva-Apurnatva-Nirdesa, the Buddha links the tathāgatagarbha to the Dharmadhātu (ultimate, all-equal, uncreated essence of all phenomena) and to essential being, stating: "What I call "be-ing" (sattva) is just a different name for this permanent, stable, pure and unchanging refuge that is free from arising and cessation, the inconceivable pure Dharmadhatu."

=== Angulimaliya Sūtra ===
Every being has Buddha-nature (Buddha-dhatu). It is indicated in the Aṅgulimālīya Sūtra that if the Buddhas themselves were to try to find any sentient being who lacked the Buddha-nature, they would fail. In fact, it is stated in this sutra that the Buddhas do discern the presence of the everlasting Buddha-nature in every being:

Even though all Buddhas themselves were to search assiduously, they would not find a tathāgata-garbha (Buddha-nature) that is not eternal, for the eternal dhātu, the buddha-dhātu (Buddha Principle, Buddha Nature), the dhātu adorned with infinite major and minor attributes, is present in all beings.

Belief and faith in the true reality of the tathāgatagarbha is presented by the relevant scriptures as a positive mental act and is strongly urged; indeed, rejection of the tathāgatagarbha is linked with highly adverse karmic consequences. In the Angulimaliya Sutra it is stated that teaching only non-self and dismissing the reality of the tathāgatagarbha karmically lead one into most unpleasant rebirths, whereas spreading the doctrine of the tathāgatagarbha will bring benefit both to oneself and to the world.

=== Laṅkāvatāra Sūtra (3rd century CE) ===
The later Laṅkāvatāra Sūtra presents the tathāgatagarbha as being a teaching completely consistent with and identical to emptiness. It synthesizes tathāgatagarbha with the emptiness (śūnyatā) of the prajñāpāramitā sutras. Emptiness is the thought-transcending realm of non-duality and unconditionedness: complete freedom from all constriction and limitation.

The Laṅkāvatāra Sūtra describes the tathāgatagarbha as "by nature brightly shining and pure," and "originally pure," though "enveloped in the garments of the skandhas, dhātus and ayatanas and soiled with the dirt of attachment, hatred, delusion and false imagining." It is said to be "naturally pure," but it appears impure as it is stained by adventitious defilements. Thus the Laṅkāvatāra Sūtra identifies the luminous mind of the canon with the tathāgatagarbha.

It also equates the tathāgatagarbha (and ālaya-vijñāna) with nirvana, though this is concerned with the actual attainment of nirvana as opposed to nirvana as a timeless phenomenon.

In the later Laṅkāvatāra Sūtra it is said that the tathāgatagarbha might be mistaken for a self, which it is not. In fact, the sutra states that it is identical to the teaching of no-self.

In Section XXVIII of the Laṅkāvatāra Sūtra, Mahāmati asks Buddha, "Is not this Tathagata-garbha taught by the Blessed One the same as the ego-substance taught by the philosophers?" The Buddha's response:

No, Mahamati, my Tathagata-garbha is not the same as the ego taught by the philosophers; for what the Tathagatas teach is the Tathagata-garbha in the sense, Mahamati, that it is emptiness, reality-limit, Nirvana, being unborn, unqualified, and devoid of will-effort; the reason why the Tathagatas who are Arhats and Fully-Enlightened Ones, teach the doctrine pointing to the Tathagata-garbha is to make the ignorant cast aside their fear when they listen to the teaching of egolessness and to have them realise the state of non-discrimination and imagelessness. I also wish, Mahamati, that the Bodhisattva-Mahasattvas of the present and future would not attach themselves to the idea of an ego [imagining it to be a soul]. Mahamati, it is like a potter who manufactures various vessels out of a mass of clay of one sort by his own manual skill and labour combined with a rod, water, and thread, Mahamati, that the Tathagatas preach the egolessness of things which removes all the traces of discrimination by various skilful means issuing from their transcendental wisdom, that is, sometimes by the doctrine of the Tathagata-garbha, sometimes by that of egolessness, and, like a potter, by means of various terms, expressions, and synonyms. For this reason, Mahamati, the philosophers' doctrine of an ego-substance is not the same as the teaching of the Tathagata-garbha. Thus, Mahamati, the doctrine of the Tathagata-garbha is disclosed in order to awaken the philosophers from their clinging to the idea of the ego, so that those minds that have fallen into the views imagining the non-existent ego as real, and also into the notion that the triple emancipation is final, may rapidly be awakened to the state of supreme enlightenment. Accordingly, Mahamati, the Tathagatas who are Arhats and Fully-Enlightened Ones disclose the doctrine of the Tathagata-garbha which is thus not to be known as identical with the philosopher's notion of an ego-substance. Therefore. Mahamati, in order to abandon the misconception cherished by the philosophers, you must strive after the teaching of egolessness and the Tathagata-garbha.

Yet in the concluding Sagathakam portion of the text, coming after the above-quoted passage, the sutra does not deny the reality of the Self; in fact it castigates such denial of the 'pure Self'. According to Thomas Cleary, "The original scripture rigorously rejects nihilism and does not ultimately deny either self or world", and quotes the sutra: "Confused thinkers without guidance are in a cave of consciousness running hither and thither seeking to explain the self. The pure self has to be realized first hand; that is the matrix of realization [Tathagatagarbha], inaccessible to speculative thinkers."

The tathāgatagarbha doctrine became linked (in syncretic form) with doctrines of Citta-mātra ("just-the-mind") or Yogācāra. Yogācārins aimed to account for the possibility of the attainment of Buddhahood by ignorant sentient beings: the tathāgatagarbha is the indwelling awakening of bodhi in the very heart of samsara. There is also a tendency in the tathāgatagarbha sutras to support vegetarianism, as all persons and creatures are compassionately viewed as possessing one and the same essential nature - the Buddha-dhatu or Buddha-nature.

== Treatises based on the Tathāgatagarbha sūtras ==
There are two very influential treatises (shastras) on Buddha-nature which draw on and systematize the Tathāgatagarbha sutra material:

- Ratnagotravibhāga, which is very influential in Tibetan Buddhism and was translated into Chinese as well.
- Awakening of Faith in the Mahayana (Chinese: 大乘起信論; pinyin: Dàshéng Qǐxìn Lùn), which is very important in East Asian Buddhism but not studied in Tibetan Buddhism.

Furthermore, there are three other Indian Buddha-nature treatises preserved only in Chinese:

- Dharmadhātvaviśeṣaśāstra (Ch: Dasheng fajie wuchabie lun, 大乘法界無差別論), attributed to Saramati (the same author to which the Chinese tradition attributes the Ratnagotravibhāga).
- Buddhagotraśāstra (佛性論, Fó xìng lùn, Buddha-nature treatise, Taishō no. 1610), said to have been translated by Paramartha and is attributed by Chinese tradition to Vasubandhu.
- Anuttarâśrayasūtra, which according to Takasaki "is clearly a composition based upon the Ratna-[gotravibhāga]."

=== Ratnagotravibhāga ===
Of disputed authorship, the Ratnagotravibhāga (otherwise known as the Mahāyānottaratantraśāstra or just Uttaratantra - "The Supreme Continuum"), is the only Indian attempt to create a coherent philosophical model based on the ideas found in the Tathāgatagarbha Sutras. The Ratnagotravibhāga especially draws on the Śrīmālādevī Siṃhanāda Sūtra. Despite East Asian Buddhism's propensity for the concepts found in the Tathāgatagarbha Sutras, the Ratnagotravibhāga has played a relatively small role in East Asian Buddhism. This is due to the primacy of sutra study and the centrality of the Awakening of Faith in East Asian Buddhism.

The Ratnagotravibhāga sees the Buddha-nature (tathāgatagarbha) as "suchness" or "thusness" - the abiding reality of all things - in a state of tarnished concealment within the being. The idea is that the ultimate consciousness of each being is spotless and pure, but surrounded by negative tendencies which are impure. Paul Williams comments on how the impurity is actually not truly part of the Buddha-nature, but merely conceals the immanent true qualities of Buddha mind (i.e. the Buddha-nature) from manifesting openly:

The impurities that taint the mind and entail the state of unenlightenment (samsara) are completely adventitious ... On the other hand from the point of view of the mind's pure radiant intrinsic nature, because it is like this it is possessed of all the many qualities of a Buddha's mind. These do not need actually to be brought about but merely need to be allowed to shine forth. Because they are intrinsic to the very nature of consciousness itself they, and the very state of Buddhahood, will never cease.

== See also ==
- Dolpopa
- Dzogchen
- Hiranyagarbha
- Jonang, sect of Tibetan Buddhism
- Kunjed Gyalpo Tantra
- Shentong doctrine
- Emptiness in the Tathāgatagarbha Sutras
- Vegetarianism in Buddhism

== Sources ==
- Blum, Mark L. (2013), The Nirvana Sutra, Vol. 1 (PDF), BDK America, archived from the original (PDF) on 2024-05-01
- Brandon, G. S. F., ed. (1972). A Dictionary of Buddhism. New York: Charles Scribner's Sons. ISBN 0-684-12763-6.
- Brown, Brian Edward (1991). The Buddha Nature: A Study of the Tathāgatagarbha and Ālayavijñāna. Motilal Banarsidass. ISBN 9788120806313.
- Buswell, Robert Jr; Lopez, Donald S. Jr., eds. (2013). Princeton Dictionary of Buddhism. Princeton, NJ: Princeton University Press. ISBN 9780691157863.
- Cleary, Thomas (2012). The Lankavatara Sutra (Kindle ed.). Kindle Locations 69-71.
- Harvey, Peter (1989). "Consciousness Mysticism in the Discourses of the Buddha". In Werner, Karel (ed.). The Yogi and the Mystic. Curzon Press. ISBN 0700702016.
- Henshall, Ron (2007). The Unborn and Emancipation from the Born (PDF) (Master's thesis).
- Hodge, Stephen (2006). On the Eschatology of the Mahaparinirvana Sutra and Related Matters (PDF) (Speech). University of London, SOAS. Archived from the original (PDF) on June 14, 2013.
- Hodge, Stephen. "English translation of excerpts from the Angulimaliya Sutra". Archived from the original on 2011-06-04.
- Holt, Sree Padma; Barber, Anthony W. (2008). Buddhism in the Krishna River Valley of Andhra.
- Hookham, Shenpen (1998). The Shrimaladevi Sutra. Oxford: Logchen Foundation.
- Hopkins, Jeffrey (2006). Mountain Doctrine: Tibet's Fundamental Treatise on Other-Emptiness and the Buddha-Matrix. New York: Snow Lion Publications.
- King, Sallie B. (1991). Buddha Nature. SUNY Press.
- Liu, Ming-Wood (1982), "The Doctrine of the Buddha-Nature in the Mahāyāna Mahāparinirvāṇa Sūtra.", Journal of the International Association of Buddhist Studies, 5 (2): 63–94, archived from the original on October 16, 2013
- Lopez, Donald S. Jr., ed. (1995). Buddhism in Practice. Princeton University Press.
- Lopez, Donald S. (2001). The Story of Buddhism: a concise guide to its history & teaching. New York: HarperCollins Publishers. ISBN 0-06-069976-0.
- Muller, A. Charles (1999). The Sutra of Perfect Enlightenment. State University of New York Press.
- Paul, Diana Y. (2004). THE SUTRA OF QUEEN ŚRĪMĀLĀ OF THE LION'S ROAR. Numata Center for Buddhist Translation and Research. p. 40. ISBN 1886439311.
- Radich, Michael (2015). "Tathāgatagarbha Scriptures". In Silk, Jonathan; Hinüber, Oskar von; Eltschinger, Vincent (eds.). Brill's Encyclopedia of Buddhism. Vol. 1: Literature and Languages. Leiden: Brill. pp. 261–273.
- Sutton, Florin Giripescu (1991). Existence and Enlightenment in the Laṅkāvatāra-sūtra: A Study in the Ontology and Epistemology of the Yogācāra School of Mahāyāna Buddhism. SUNY Press.
- Suzuki, D.T. (1932). The Lankavatara Sutra. Translated by Suzuki, D.T. London: Routledge & Kegen Paul.
- Thanissaro, Bhikkhu (1995). "Pabhassara Sutta: Luminous".
- Wang, Youru (2003). Linguistic Strategies in Daoist Zhuangzi and Chan Buddhism: The Other Way of Speaking. Routledge.
- Wayman, Alex; Wayman, Hideko (1990). The Lion's Roar of Queen Śrīmālā: A Buddhist Scripture on the Tathāgatagarbha Theory. Motilal Banarsidass. ISBN 9788120807310.
- Williams, Paul (2000). Buddhist Thought. Routledge.
- Williams, Paul (2009). Mahayana Buddhism. Routledge.
- Yamamoto, Kosho (1975). Mahayanism: A Critical Exposition of the Mahayana Mahaparinirvana Sutra. Karinbunko.
