= Ātman (Buddhism) =

Buddhist concept of self

Ātman (/ˈɑːtmən/), attā or attan in Buddhism is the concept of self, and is found in Buddhist literature's discussion of the concept of non-self (anatta). Most Buddhist traditions and texts reject the premise of a permanent, unchanging atman (self, soul).

== Etymology ==
Cognates (Sanskrit: आत्मन्) ātman, Pāli atta, Old English æthm, and German Atem derive from the Indo-European root *ēt-men (breath). The word means "essence, breath, soul."

Ātman and atta refer to a person's "true self", a person's permanent self, absolute within, the "thinker of thoughts, feeler of sensations" separate from and beyond the changing phenomenal world. The term Ātman is synonymous with Tuma, Atuma and Attan in early Buddhist literature, state Rhys David and William Stede, all in the sense of "self, soul". The Atman and Atta are related, in Buddhist canons, to terms such as Niratta (Nir+attan, soulless) and Attaniya (belonging to the soul, having a soul, of the nature of soul).

== Early Buddhism ==
"Atman" in early Buddhism appears as "all dhammas are not-Self (an-atta)", where atta (atman) refers to a metaphysical Self, states Peter Harvey, that is a "permanent, substantial, autonomous self or I". This concept refers to the pre-Buddhist Upanishads of Hinduism, where a distinction is made between the personal self, jivatman (impermanent body, personality) and the Real Self, Atman. The early Buddhist literature explores the validity of the Upanishadic concepts of self and Self, then asserts that every living being has an impermanent self but there is no real Higher Self. The Nikaya texts of Buddhism deny that there is anything called Ātman that is the substantial absolute or essence of a living being, an idea that distinguishes Buddhism from the Brahmanical (proto-Hindu) traditions.

The Buddha argued that no permanent, unchanging "Self" can be found. In Buddha's view, states Wayman, "eso me atta, or this is my Self, is to be in the grip of wrong view". All conditioned phenomena are subject to change, and therefore can't be taken to be an unchanging "Self". Instead, the Buddha explains the perceived continuity of the human personality by describing it as composed of five skandhas, without a permanent entity (Self, soul).

== Pudgalavada ==
Of the early Indian Buddhist schools, only the Pudgalavada-school diverged from this basic teaching. The Pudgalavādins asserted that, while there is no ātman, there is a pudgala or "person", which is neither the same as nor different from the skandhas.

== Buddha-nature ==
Buddha-nature is a central notion of east-Asian (Chinese) Mahayana thought. It refers to several related terms, (Note: Buddha-dhatu, mind, Tathagatagarbha, Dharma-dhatu, suchness (tathata).) most notably Tathāgatagarbha and Buddha-dhātu. (Note: Sanskrit; Jp. Busshō, "Buddha-nature".) Tathāgatagarbha means "the womb of the thus-gone" (cf. enlightened one), while Buddha-dhātu literally means "Buddha-realm" or "Buddha-substrate". (Note: Trainor 2004, p. 207: "a sacred nature that is the basis for [beings'] becoming buddhas.") Several key texts refer to the tathāgatagarbha or Buddha-dhātu as "atman", Self or essence, though those texts also contain warnings against a literal interpretation. Several scholars have noted similarities between tathāgatagarbha texts and the substantial monism found in the atman/Brahman tradition.

The Tathagatagarbha doctrine, at its earliest, probably appeared about the later part of the 3rd century CE, and is verifiable in Chinese translations of 1st millennium CE.

=== Mahāyāna Mahāparinirvāṇa Sūtra ===
In contrast to the madhyamika-tradition, the Mahāparinirvāṇa Sūtra uses "positive language" to denote "absolute reality". According to Paul Williams, the Mahāyāna Mahāparinirvāṇa Sūtra teaches an underlying essence, "Self", or "atman". This "true Self" is the Buddha-nature (Tathagatagarbha), which is present in all sentient beings, and realized by the awakened ones. Most scholars consider the Tathagatagarbha doctrine in Mahāparinirvāṇa Sūtra asserting an 'essential nature' in every living being is equivalent to 'Self', (Note: Wayman and Wayman have disagreed with this view, and they state that the Tathagatagarbha is neither self nor sentient being, nor soul, nor personality.) and it contradicts the Anatta doctrines in a vast majority of Buddhist texts, leading scholars to posit that the Tathagatagarbha Sutras were written to promote Buddhism to non-Buddhists.

According to Sallie B. King, the Mahāyāna Mahāparinirvāṇa Sūtra does not represent a major innovation. Its most important innovation is the linking of the term buddhadhatu with tathagatagarbha. According to King, the sutra is rather unsystematic, which made it "a fruitful one for later students and commentators, who were obliged to create their own order and bring it to the text". The sutra speaks about Buddha-nature in so many different ways, that Chinese scholars created a list of types of Buddha-nature that could be found in the text. One of those statements is:

Even though he has said that all phenomena [dharmas] are devoid of the Self, it is not that they are completely/ truly devoid of the Self. What is this Self ? Any phenomenon [dharma] that is true [satya], real [tattva], eternal [nitya], sovereign/ autonomous/ self-governing [aisvarya], and whose ground/ foundation is unchanging [asraya-aviparinama], is termed ’the Self ’ [atman].

In the Mahāparinirvāṇa Sūtra the Buddha also speaks of the "affirmative attributes" of nirvana, "the Eternal, Bliss, the Self and the Pure." The Mahāyāna Mahāparinirvāṇa Sūtra explains:

The Self ’ signifies the Buddha; ’the Eternal’ signifies the Dharmakaya; ’Bliss’ signifies Nirvana, and ’the Pure’ signifies Dharma.

Edward Conze connotatively links the term tathagata itself (the designation which the Buddha applied to himself) with the notion of a real, true self:

Just as tathata designates true reality in general, so the word which developed into Tathagata designated the true self, the true reality within man.

It is possible, states Johannes Bronkhorst, that "original Buddhism did not deny the existence of the soul [Ātman, Attan]", even though a firm Buddhist tradition has maintained that the Buddha avoided talking about the soul or even denied it existence. While there may be ambivalence on the existence or non-existence of self in early Buddhist literature, adds Bronkhorst, it is clear from these texts that seeking self-knowledge is not the Buddhist path for liberation, and turning away from self-knowledge is. This is a reverse position to the Vedic traditions which recognized the knowledge of the self as "the principal means to achieving liberation".

=== "Self" as a teaching method ===
According to Paul Wiliams, the Mahaparinirvana Sutra uses the term "Self" in order to win over non-Buddhist ascetics. He quotes from the sutra:

The Buddha-nature is in fact not the self. For the sake of [guiding] sentient beings, I describe it as the self.

In the later Lankāvatāra Sūtra it is said that the tathāgatagarbha might be mistaken for a self, which it is not.

=== Ratnagotravibhāga ===
The Ratnagotravibhāga (also known as Uttaratantra), another text composed in the first half of 1st millennium CE and translated into Chinese in 511 CE, points out that the teaching of the Tathagatagarbha doctrine is intended to win sentient beings over to abandoning "self-love" (atma-sneha) – considered to be a moral defect in Buddhism. The 6th-century Chinese Tathagatagarbha translation states that "Buddha has shiwo (True Self) which is beyond being and nonbeing". However, the Ratnagotravibhāga asserts that the "Self" implied in Tathagatagarbha doctrine is actually "not-Self".

== Current disputes ==
The dispute about "self" and "not-self" doctrines has continued throughout the history of Buddhism. According to Johannes Bronkhorst, it is possible that "original Buddhism did not deny the existence of the soul", even though a firm Buddhist tradition has maintained that the Buddha avoided talking about the soul or even denied its existence. French religion writer André Migot also states that original Buddhism may not have taught a complete absence of self, pointing to evidence presented by Buddhist and Pali scholars Jean Przyluski and Caroline Rhys Davids that early Buddhism generally believed in a self, making Buddhist schools that admit an existence of a "self" not heretical, but conservative, adhering to ancient beliefs. In his book, The Atman-Brahman in Ancient Buddhism, scholar Kamaleswar Bhattacharya wrote that, while Shakyamuni Buddha did indeed teach against a permanent self within the ever-changing aggregates, both he and early Buddhists believed in an impersonal, universal atman. While there may be ambivalence on the existence or non-existence of self in early Buddhist literature, Bronkhorst suggests that these texts clearly indicate that the Buddhist path of liberation consists not in seeking self-knowledge, but in turning away from what might erroneously be regarded as the self. This is a reverse position to the Vedic traditions which recognized the knowledge of the self as "the principal means to achieving liberation."

In Thai Theravada Buddhism, for example, states Paul Williams, some modern era Buddhist scholars have said that "nirvana is indeed the true Self", while other Thai Buddhists disagree. For instance, the Dhammakaya Movement in Thailand teaches that it is erroneous to subsume nirvana under the rubric of anatta (non-self); instead, nirvana is taught to be the "true self" or dhammakaya. The Dhammakaya Movement teaching that nirvana is atta, or true self, was criticized as heretical in Buddhism in 1994 by Ven. Payutto, a well-known scholar monk, who stated that 'Buddha taught nibbana as being non-self". The abbot of one major temple in the Dhammakaya Movement, Luang Por Sermchai of Wat Luang Por Sodh Dhammakayaram, argues that it tends to be scholars who hold the view of absolute non-self, rather than Buddhist meditation practitioners. He points to the experiences of prominent forest hermit monks such as Luang Pu Sodh and Ajahn Mun to support the notion of a "true self". Similar interpretations on the "true self" were put forth earlier by the 12th Supreme Patriarch of Thailand in 1939. According to Williams, the Supreme Patriarch's interpretation echoes the tathāgatagarbha sutras.

Several notable teachers of the Thai Forest Tradition have also described ideas in contrast to absolute non-self. Ajahn Maha Bua, a well known meditation master, described the citta (mind) as being an indestructible reality that does not fall under anattā. He has stated that not-self is merely a perception that is used to pry one away from infatuation with the concept of a self, and that once this infatuation is gone the idea of not-self must be dropped as well. American monk Thanissaro Bhikkhu of the Thai Forest Tradition describes the Buddha's statements on non-self as a path to awakening rather than a universal truth. Thanissaro Bhikkhu states that the Buddha intentionally set aside the question of whether or not there is a self as a useless question, and that clinging to the idea that there is no self at all would actually prevent enlightenment. Bhikkhu Bodhi authored a rejoinder to Thanissaro, writing that "The reason the teaching of anatta can serve as a strategy of liberation is precisely because it serves to rectify a misconception about the nature of being, hence an ontological error."

Buddhist scholars Richard Gombrich and Alexander Wynne argue that the Buddha's descriptions of non-self in early Buddhist texts do not deny that there is a self. Gethin writes that anatta is often mistranslated as meaning "not having a self", but in reality meant "not the self". Wynne say that early Buddhist texts such as the Anattalakkhana Sutta do not deny that there is a self, stating that the five aggregates that are described as not self are not descriptions of a human being but descriptions of the human experience. Wynne and Gombrich both argue that the Buddha's statements on anattā were originally a "not-self" teaching that developed into a "no-self" teaching in later Buddhist thought. Thanissaro Bhikkhu points to the Ananda Sutta (SN 44.10), where the Buddha stays silent when asked whether there is a 'self' or not, as a major cause of the dispute.

== See also ==
- Angulimaliya Sutra
- Anguttara Nikaya
- Anattā
- Brahman
- Brahma-viharas
- Digha Nikaya
- Khuddaka Nikaya
- Kunjed Gyalpo Tantra
- Luminous mind
- Samyutta Nikaya
- Self (spirituality)
- Shunyata
- Soul
- Srimala Sutra
- Three marks of existence
