= Mahayana sutras =

Religious texts in the Mahayana Buddhist tradition

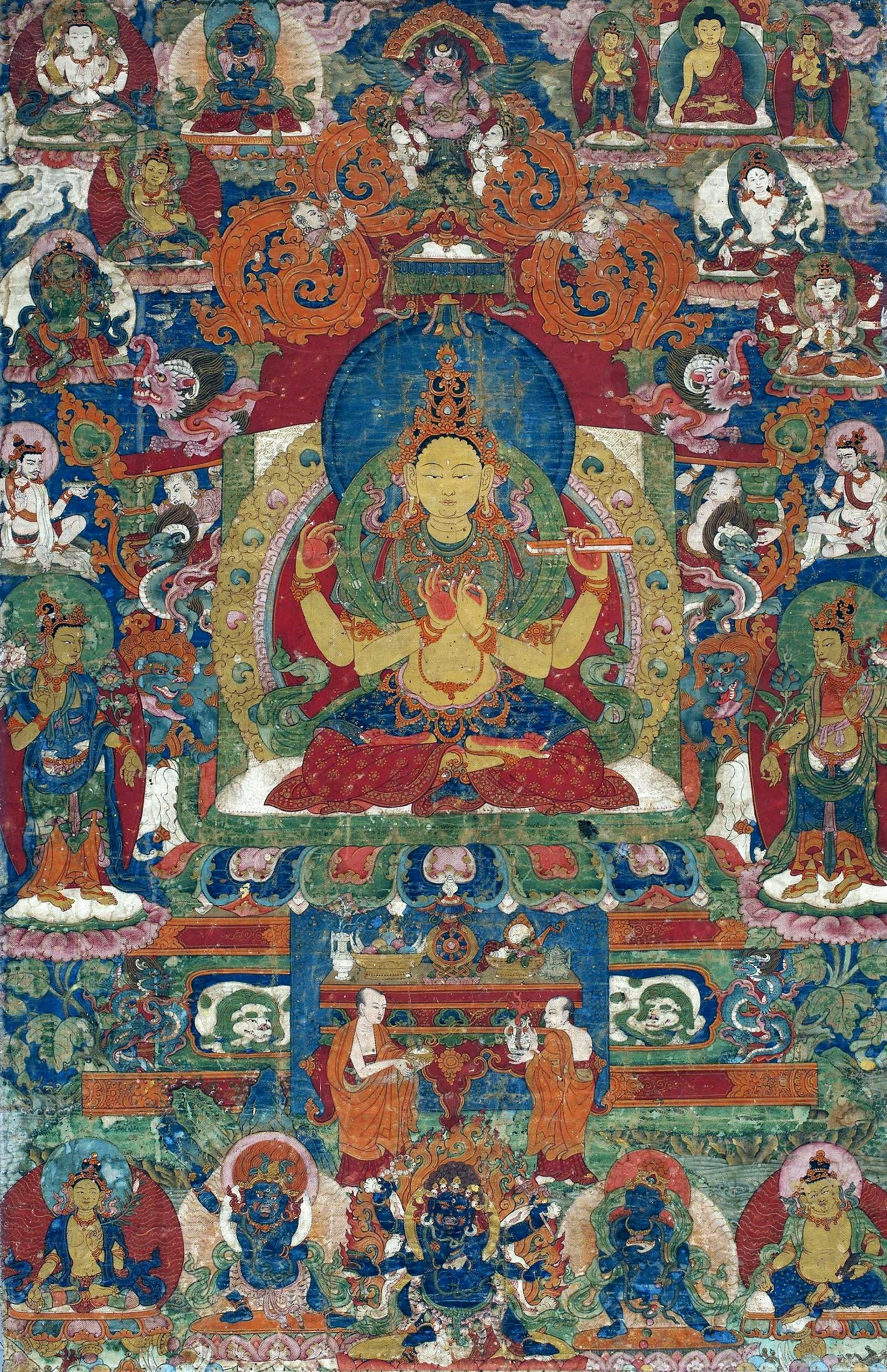
Nepalese Thangka with Prajñāpāramitā, the personification of transcendent wisdom (prajñā), holding the Prajñāpāramitā Sūtra

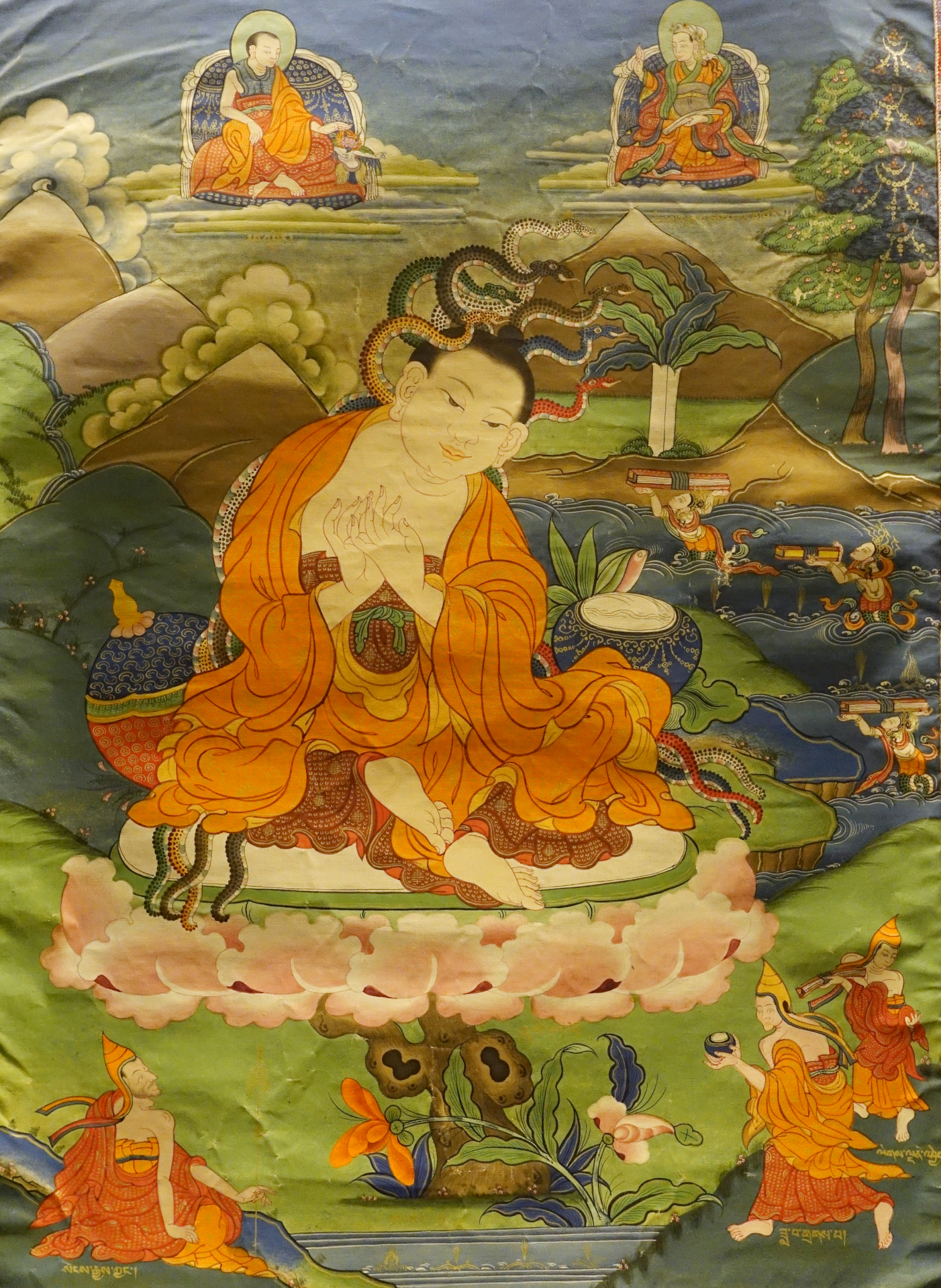
A Tibetan depiction of Nagarjuna receiving Mahayana sūtras from the Nāgas (on the right)

The Mahayana sutras are Buddhist texts that are accepted as canonical and authentic buddhavacana in Mahayana Buddhist sanghas. These include three types of sutras: those spoken by the Buddha, those spoken through the Buddha's blessings, and those spoken through mandate. They are largely preserved in Sanskrit manuscripts, and in translations such as the Tibetan Buddhist canon, and Chinese Buddhist canon. Several hundred Mahāyāna sutras survive in Sanskrit, Tibetan and Chinese translations. The Buddhist scholar Asanga classified the Mahāyāna sūtras as part of the Bodhisattva Tripiṭaka, a collection of texts meant for bodhisattvas.

Buddhists consider the most important Mahayana sutras to be the spoken teachings of Shakyamuni Buddha. These were quickly recorded one year following his Mahaparinirvana, when the Buddha's main attendant Ananda recited these Sutras in their entirety at the First Buddhist Council, where they were recorded. At that Council, two other attendants recited two other classifications of the Buddha's teachings. Other Mahāyāna sūtras are presented as being taught by masters such as bodhisattvas like Mañjuśrī and Avalokiteśvara. There are various reasons that Indian Mahāyāna Buddhists give to explain why some Sutras appeared at later times. One such reason is that they had been hidden away in the land of the Nāgas (snake deities, dragons) until the proper time for their dissemination arrived. They are also sometimes called Vaipulya ("extensive") sūtras by earlier sources.

Modern scholars of Buddhist studies generally agree these sūtras began to be more widely disseminated between the 1st century BCE and the 1st century CE. They continued being composed, compiled, and edited until the decline of Buddhism in ancient India. Some of them may have also been composed outside of India, such as in Central Asia and in East Asia. Some of the most influential Mahāyāna sūtras include the Lotus Sutra, the Perfection of Wisdom Sutras, the Avatamsaka Sutra, the Lankavatara Sutra, the Pure Land Sutras, and the Nirvana Sutra.

The Mahāyāna sūtras were not accepted by all Buddhists in ancient India, and the various Indian Buddhist schools disagreed on their status as "word of the Buddha". They are generally not accepted as the Buddha's word by the school of Theravāda Buddhism.

== History and background ==
=== Origins and early history ===
The origins of the Mahāyāna and their sūtras are not completely understood. Modern scholars have proposed numerous theories about the origins of Mahāyāna and the Mahāyāna texts.

Some of the main theories are the following:

- The lay origins theory, first proposed by Jean Przyluski and then defended by Étienne Lamotte and Akira Hirakawa, states that laypersons were particularly important in the development of Mahāyāna and its texts. This is partly based on some texts like the Vimalakirti Sūtra, which praise lay figures at the expense of monastics. This theory is no longer widely accepted.
- The theory which held that Mahāyāna developed within the Mahāsāṃghika tradition. Drewes notes that there is actually little evidence that Mahāsāṃghika schools had a special connection to the production of Mahāyāna texts, and it seems Mahāyāna arose as a pan-Buddhist phenomenon.
- The "forest hypothesis", which states that Mahāyāna arose mainly among hardcore wilderness ascetics (aranyavasins) who were attempting to imitate the Buddha. This has been defended by Paul Harrison and Jan Nattier. This theory is based on certain sutras like the Ugraparipṛcchā Sūtra and the Mahāyāna Rāṣṭrapālapaṛiprcchā which promote ascetic practice in the wilderness as a superior and elite path. These texts criticize monks who live in cities and denigrate the forest life. However, Drewes notes that only a few early Mahāyāna texts advocate or promote this practice, and other Sūtras outright discourage forest dwelling or say it is unnecessary.
- The cult of the book theory, defended by Gregory Schopen, states that Mahāyāna arose among a number of loosely connected book worshiping groups of monastics, who studied, memorized, copied and revered particular Mahāyāna sūtras. Schopen also argued that these groups mostly rejected stupa worship, or worshiping holy relics.

According to David Drewes, none of these theories have been satisfactorily proven and they lack sufficient evidence. Drewes writes that the most likely origin of Mahāyāna is that it was "primarily a textual movement, focused on the revelation, preaching, and dissemination of Mahāyāna sūtras, that developed within, and never really departed from, traditional Buddhist social and institutional structures." The figures of this movement probably saw themselves as bodhisattvas entrusted with teaching and preserving the Mahāyāna sūtras.

Scholars like Joseph Walser have also noted how Mahāyāna sūtras are heterogeneous and seem to have been composed in different communities with varying ideas. Walser writes that "Mahāyāna was probably never unitary, but differed from region to region.". Likewise, Hajime Nakamura states:

Unlike the various recensions of the Hīnayāna canon, which were virtually closed by the early centuries of the common era and which shared, at least ideally, a common structure . . . the Mahāyāna scriptures were composed in a variety of disparate social and religious environments over the course of several centuries, diverge widely from each other in content and outlook, and were in many cases meant to stand as individual works representing (it has been conjectured) rivals to the entire Hīnayāna corpus.

There is also no evidence that Mahāyāna ever referred to a separate formal school or sect of Buddhism, but rather that it existed within the early Buddhist schools as a certain set of ideals, texts and later doctrines, for bodhisattvas. Mahāyānists also never had a separate Vinaya (monastic rule) from the early Buddhist schools. The Chinese monk Yijing who visited India in the seventh century, writes about how Mahāyāna monastics and non-Mahāyāna monastics lived together under the same Vinaya. The only difference among them was that Mahāyāna monks venerated the bodhisattvas and read the Mahāyāna sūtras. Some scholars like Richard Gombrich think that Mahāyāna Sūtras only arose after the practice of writing down religious texts became widespread in India and thus that they were always written documents. However, James Apple and David Drewes have drawn attention to these oral features of the early Mahāyāna texts, which were not written documents but orally preserved teachings. Drewes writes, that Mahāyāna sūtras

advocate mnemic/oral/aural practices more frequently than they do written ones, make reference to people who have memorized or are in the process of memorizing them, and consistently attach higher prestige to mnemic/oral practices than to ones involving written texts. Study of differences in various versions of sutras translated into Chinese has directly shown that these texts were often transmitted orally.

Mahāyāna sūtras were committed to memory and recited by important learned monks called "Dharma reciters" (dharmabhāṇaka), who were viewed as the substitute for the actual speaking presence of the Buddha.

Much of the early extant evidence for the origins of Mahāyāna comes from early Chinese translations of Mahāyāna texts. These Mahāyāna teachings were first propagated into China by Lokakṣema, the first translator of Mahāyāna Sūtras into Chinese during the second century.

The Mahāyāna movement remained quite small until the fifth century, with very few manuscripts having been found before then (the exceptions are from Bamiyan). According to Joseph Walser, the fifth and sixth centuries saw a great increase in their production. By this time, Chinese pilgrims, such as Faxian, Yijing, and Xuanzang were traveling to India, and their writings describe monasteries which they label 'Mahāyāna' as well as monasteries where both Mahāyāna monks and non-Mahāyāna monks lived together.

=== Modern scholarly views on dating ===
Dating the Mahāyāna sūtras is quite difficult; and many can only be dated firmly to when they were translated into another language.

Andrew Skilton summarizes a common prevailing view of the Mahāyāna sūtras among modern Buddhist studies scholars as follows:

Western scholarship does not go so far as to impugn the religious authority of Mahayana sutras, but it tends to assume that they are not the literal word of the historical Śākyamuni Buddha. Unlike the śrāvaka critics just cited, we have no possibility of knowing just who composed and compiled these texts, and for us, removed from the time of their authors by up to two millennia, they are effectively an anonymous literature. It is widely accepted that Mahayana sutras constitute a body of literature that began to appear from as early as the 1st century BCE, although the evidence for this date is circumstantial. The concrete evidence for dating any part of this literature is to be found in dated Chinese translations, amongst which we find a body of ten Mahayana sutras translated by Lokaksema before 186 C.E. – and these constitute our earliest objectively dated Mahayana texts. This picture may be qualified by the analysis of very early manuscripts recently coming out of Afghanistan, but for the meantime this is speculation. In effect we have a vast body of anonymous but relatively coherent literature, of which individual items can only be dated firmly when they were translated into another language at a known date.

A. K. Warder notes that the Mahāyāna Sūtras are highly unlikely to have come from the teachings of the historical Buddha, since the language and style of every extant Mahāyāna Sūtra is comparable more to later Indian texts than to texts that could have circulated in the Buddha's putative lifetime. Warder also notes that the Tibetan historian Tāranātha (1575–1634) proclaimed that after the Buddha taught the sutras, they disappeared from the human world and circulated only in the world of the nagas. In Warder's view, "this is as good as an admission that no such texts existed until the 2nd century A.D."

Paul Williams writes that while Mahāyāna tradition believes that the Mahāyāna sūtras were taught by the Buddha, "source-critical and historical awareness has made it impossible for the modern scholar to accept this traditional account." However, Williams further writes that

Nevertheless, it is not always absurd to suggest that a Mahāyāna sūtra or teaching may contain elements of a tradition which goes back to the Buddha himself, which was played down or just possibly excluded from the canonical formulations of the early schools. We have seen that even at the First Council there is evidence of disagreement as regards the details of the Buddha's teaching.

John W. Pettit writes that "Mahāyāna has not got a strong historical claim for representing the explicit teachings of the historical Buddha". However, he also argues that basic Mahāyāna concepts such as "the bodhisattva ethic, emptiness (sunyata), and the recognition of a distinction between buddhahood and arhatship as spiritual ideals," can be seen in the Pāli Canon. According to Pettit, this suggests that Mahāyāna is "not simply an accretion of fabricated doctrines" but "has a strong connection with the teachings of Buddha himself".

=== Questions of authenticity ===
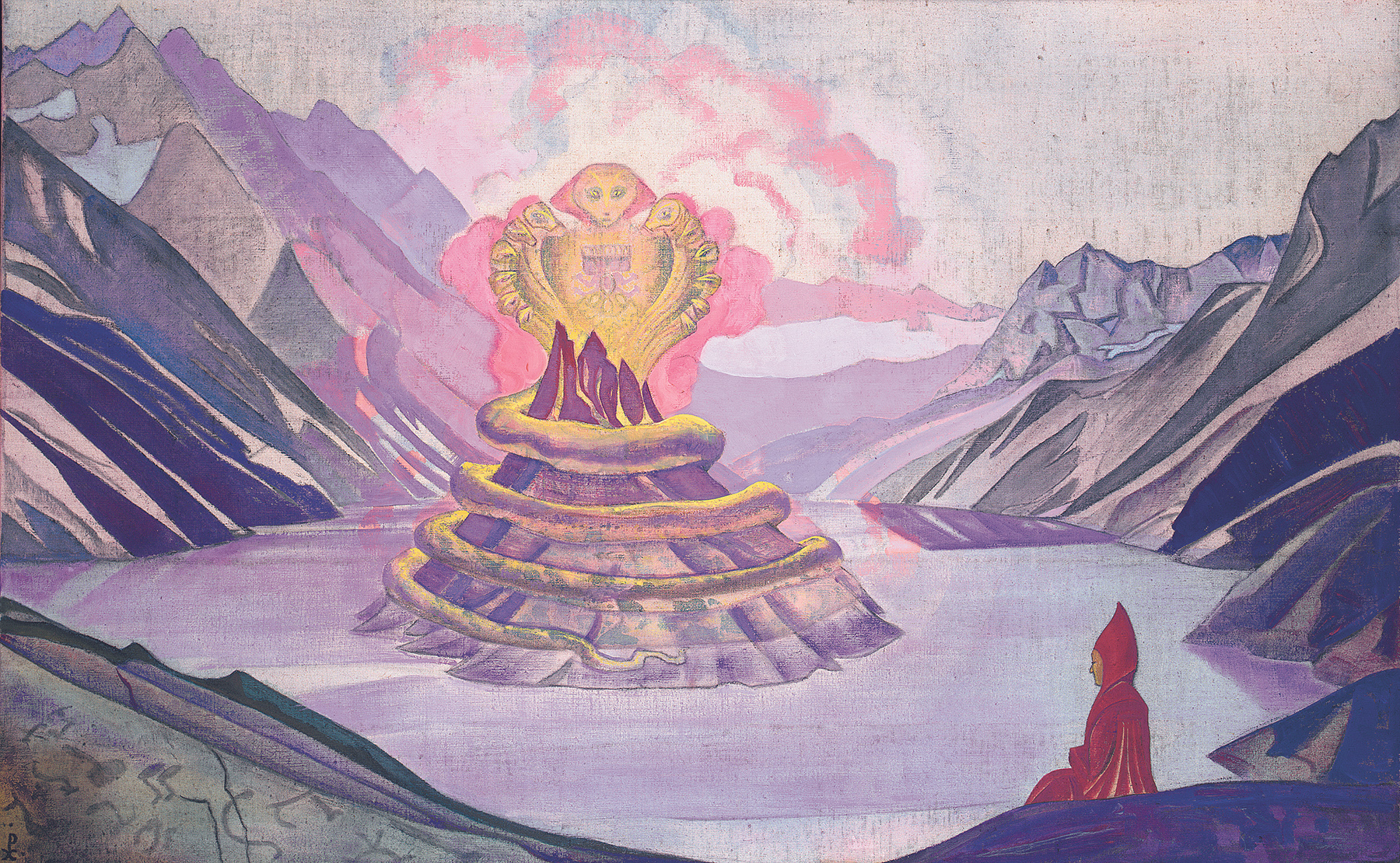
A painting by Nicholas Roerich (1925) depicting Nāgārjuna in the realm of the Nagas, where the Prajñāpāramitā was said to have been hidden

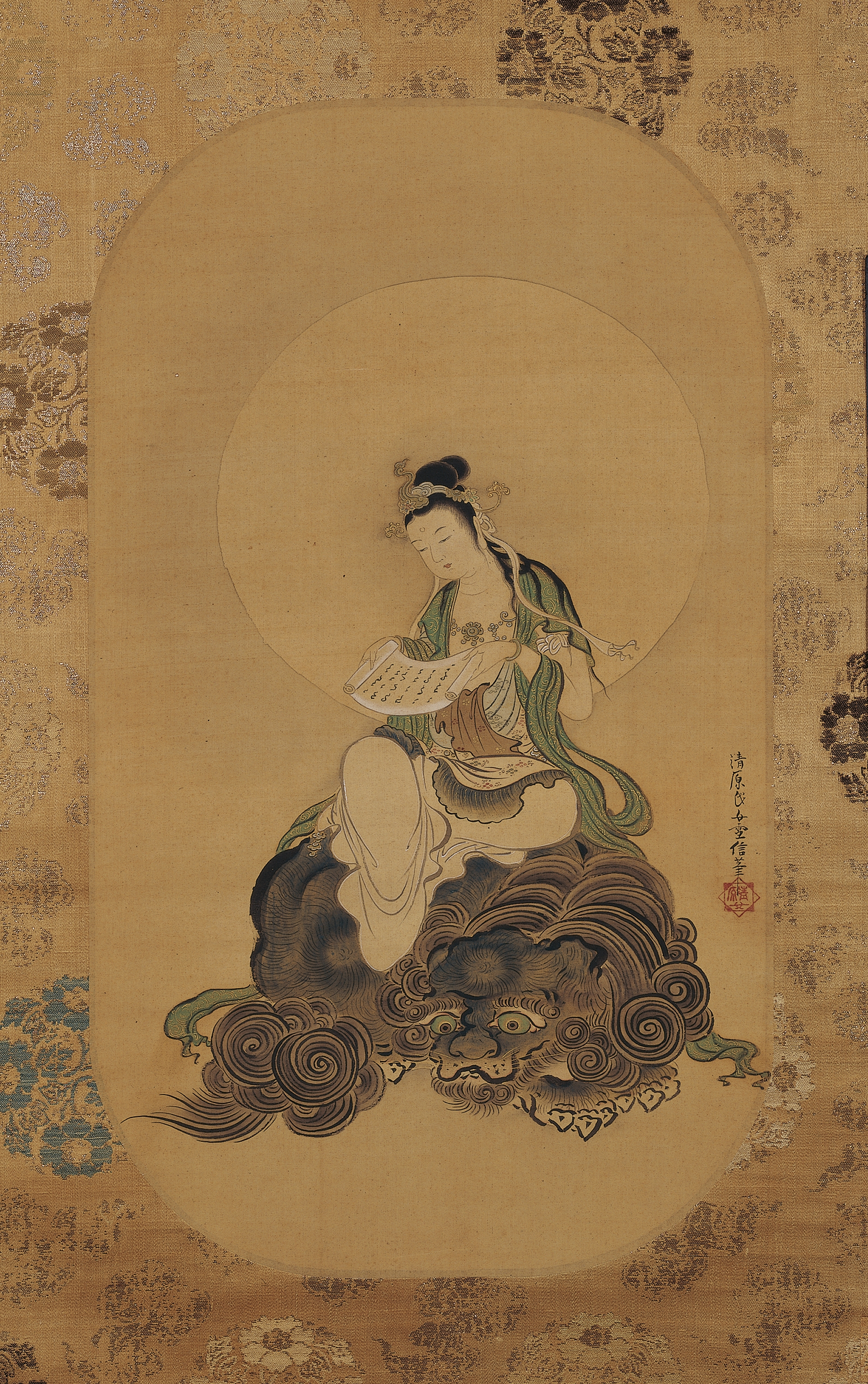
A depiction of Mañjuśrī holding a sutra, by Kiyohara Yukinobu. Mañjuśrī is a bodhisattva who is traditionally associated with wisdom and the Mahayana scriptures.

Mahāyāna sūtras are generally regarded by Mahāyānists as being more profound than the śrāvaka texts as well as generating more spiritual merit and benefit. Thus, they are seen as superior and more virtuous to non-Mahāyāna sūtras.

The Mahāyāna sūtras were not recognized as being Buddha word (buddhavacana) by various groups of Indian Buddhists and there was lively debate over their authenticity throughout the Buddhist world. Buddhist communities such as the Mahāsāṃghika school and the Theravada tradition of Sri Lanka became divided into groups which accepted or did not accept these texts. Theravāda commentaries of the Mahavihara sub-school mention these texts (which they call Vedalla/Vetulla) as not being the Buddha word and being counterfeit scriptures. The Saṃmitīya school was also known as being strongly opposed to the Mahayana sutras as noted by the Tibetan historian Tāranātha. Xuanzang reports that a Saṃmitīya known as Prajñāgupta composed a treatise which argued against the Mahāyāna.

Various Mahāyāna sūtras warn against the charge that they are not word of the Buddha and defend their authenticity in different ways. Some Mahāyāna sūtras such as the Gaṇḍavyūha often criticize early Buddhist figures, such as Sariputra for lacking knowledge and goodness, and thus, these elders or śrāvaka are seen as not intelligent enough to receive the Mahāyāna teachings.

The reason these accounts give for the historically late disclosure of the Mahāyāna teachings is that most people were initially unable to understand the Mahāyāna sūtras at the time of the Buddha (500 BCE) and suitable recipients for these teachings had not yet arisen. Some traditional accounts of the transmission of the Prajñāpāramitā sūtras claim that they were originally stored or hidden in the realm of the nāgas (serpent-like supernatural beings). Later, these sūtras were retrieved by Nāgārjuna. Other Mahāyāna sources state that they were preached or preserved by bodhisattvas like Mañjuśrī or Buddhas like Vajradhāra.

Another Mahāyāna explanation for the later appearance of the Mahāyāna sūtras in the historical record is the idea that they are the revelations of certain Buddhas and bodhisattvas, transmitted through visions and meditative experiences to a select few individuals. The practice of visualization of Buddhas (in texts like the Sukhāvatīvyūha) has been seen by some scholars as a possible explanation for the source of certain Mahāyāna sūtras which were seen as revelations from Buddha in other heavenly worlds. Williams also notes that there are other Mahāyāna texts which speak of sūtras being revealed or entrusted to forest dwelling monks by devas (deities). Paul Harrison notes that the idea that devas may preach the Buddha word is also present in non-Mahāyāna texts. Paul Harrison has also noted the importance of dream revelations in certain texts such as the Arya-svapna-nirdesa which lists and interprets 108 dream signs.

==== "Word of the Buddha" as what leads to awakening ====
A different Mahāyāna justification for the authenticity of the Mahāyāna sūtras is that they are in accord with the truth, with the Buddha's Dharma and therefore they lead to awakening. This is based on the idea that "Whatever is well spoken [subhasita], all that is the word of the Buddha [buddhabhasita]." As such, this idea holds that Mahāyāna is the "word of the Buddha" because it leads to awakening (bodhi), not because it was spoken by a specific individual with the title "Buddha". According to Venerable Hsuan Hua, there are five types of beings who may speak "Buddha word": a Buddha, a disciple of a Buddha, a deva (heavenly being), a ṛṣi (a sage), or an emanation of one of these beings; however, they must first receive certification from a Buddha that its contents are true Dharma.

The Indian Mahāyāna scholar Shantideva (8th century) states:

Through four factors is an inspired utterance [pratibhana] the word of the Buddhas. What four? (i)...the inspired utterance is connected with truth, not untruth; (ii) it is connected with the Dharma, not that which is not the Dharma; (iii) it brings about the renunciation of moral taints [klesa] not their increase; and (iv) it shows the laudable qualities of nirvana, not those of the cycle of rebirth [samsara].

Williams writes that similar ideas can be found in the Pali Canon, though it is interpreted in a more open ended way in the Mahāyāna in order to include a larger set of teachings that were seen as spiritually useful.

The modern Japanese Zen Buddhist scholar D. T. Suzuki similarly argued that while the Mahāyāna sūtras may not have been directly taught by the historical Buddha, the "spirit and central ideas" of Mahāyāna "are those of its founder". Thus, Suzuki admits (and celebrates) how the Mahāyāna evolved and adapted itself to suit the times by developing new teachings and texts, while at the same time maintaining the core "spirit" of the Buddha.

== Teachings ==
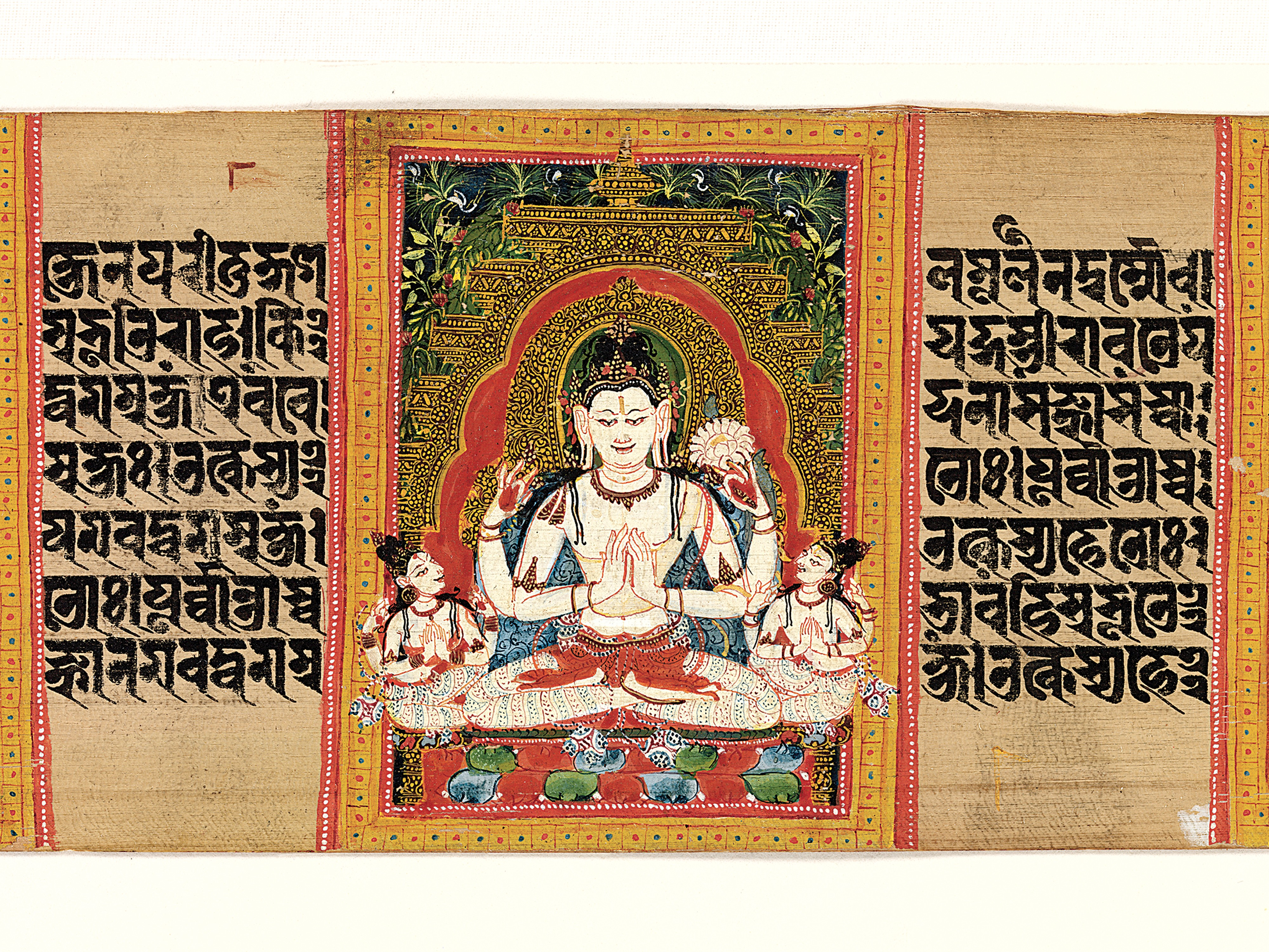
Folio from a manuscript of the Aṣṭasāhasrikā Prajñāpāramitā Sūtra depicting Shadakshari Lokesvara, early 12th century, opaque watercolor on palm leaf

=== New ideas ===
The teachings as contained in the Mahāyāna sūtras as a whole have been described as a loosely bound bundle of many teachings, which was able to contain the various contradictions. Because of these contradictory elements, there are "very few things that can be said with certainty about Mahāyāna Buddhism".

Central to the Mahāyāna sūtras is the ideal of the Bodhisattva path, something which is not unique to them, however, as such a path is also taught in non-Mahayana texts which also required prediction of future Buddhahood in the presence of a living Buddha. What is unique to Mahāyāna sūtras is the idea that the term bodhisattva is applicable to any person from the moment they intend to become a Buddha (i.e. the arising of bodhicitta) and without the requirement of a living Buddha. They also claim that any person who accepts and uses Mahāyāna sūtras either had already received or will soon receive such a prediction from a Buddha, establishing their position as an irreversible bodhisattva. Some Mahāyāna sūtras promote it as a universal path for everyone, while others like the Ugraparipṛcchā see it as something for a small elite of hardcore ascetics.

While some Mahāyāna sūtras like the Vimalakirti sūtra and the White Lotus sūtra criticize arhats and sravakas (referring to non-Mahāyānists) as lacking wisdom, and reject their path as a lower vehicle, i.e. 'hīnayāna' (the 'inferior way'), earlier Mahāyāna sūtras do not do this. As noted by David Drewes "early Mahāyāna sūtras often present their teachings as useful not only to people who wish to become Buddhas, but to those who wish to attain arhatship or pratyekabuddhahood as well. The old idea that the Mahāyāna began with the rejection of the arhat ideal in favor of that of the bodhisattva is thus clearly incorrect." Paul Williams also writes that earlier Mahāyāna sūtras like the Ugraparipṛcchā Sūtra and the Ajitasena sutra do not present any antagonism towards the hearers or the ideal of arhatship like later sutras.

According to David Drewes, Mahāyāna sūtras contain several elements besides the promotion of the bodhisattva ideal, including "expanded cosmologies and mythical histories, ideas of purelands and great, 'celestial' Buddhas and bodhisattvas, descriptions of powerful new religious practices, new ideas on the nature of the Buddha, and a range of new philosophical perspectives."

Several Mahāyāna sūtras depict Buddhas or Bodhisattvas not found in earlier texts, such as the Buddhas Amitabha, Akshobhya and Vairocana, and the bodhisattvas Maitreya, Mañjusri, Ksitigarbha, and Avalokiteshvara. An important feature of Mahāyāna is the way that it understands the nature of Buddhahood. Mahāyāna texts see Buddhas (and to a lesser extent, certain bodhisattvas as well) as transcendental or supramundane (lokuttara) beings, who live for eons constantly helping others through their activity.

According to Paul Williams, in Mahāyāna, a Buddha is often seen as "a spiritual king, relating to and caring for the world", rather than simply a teacher who after his death "has completely 'gone beyond' the world and its cares". Buddha Sakyamuni's life and death on earth is then usually understood docetically, as a "mere appearance", his death was an unreal show (which was done in order to teach others), while in reality he continues to live in a transcendent realm in order to help all beings.

=== Spiritual Practices ===
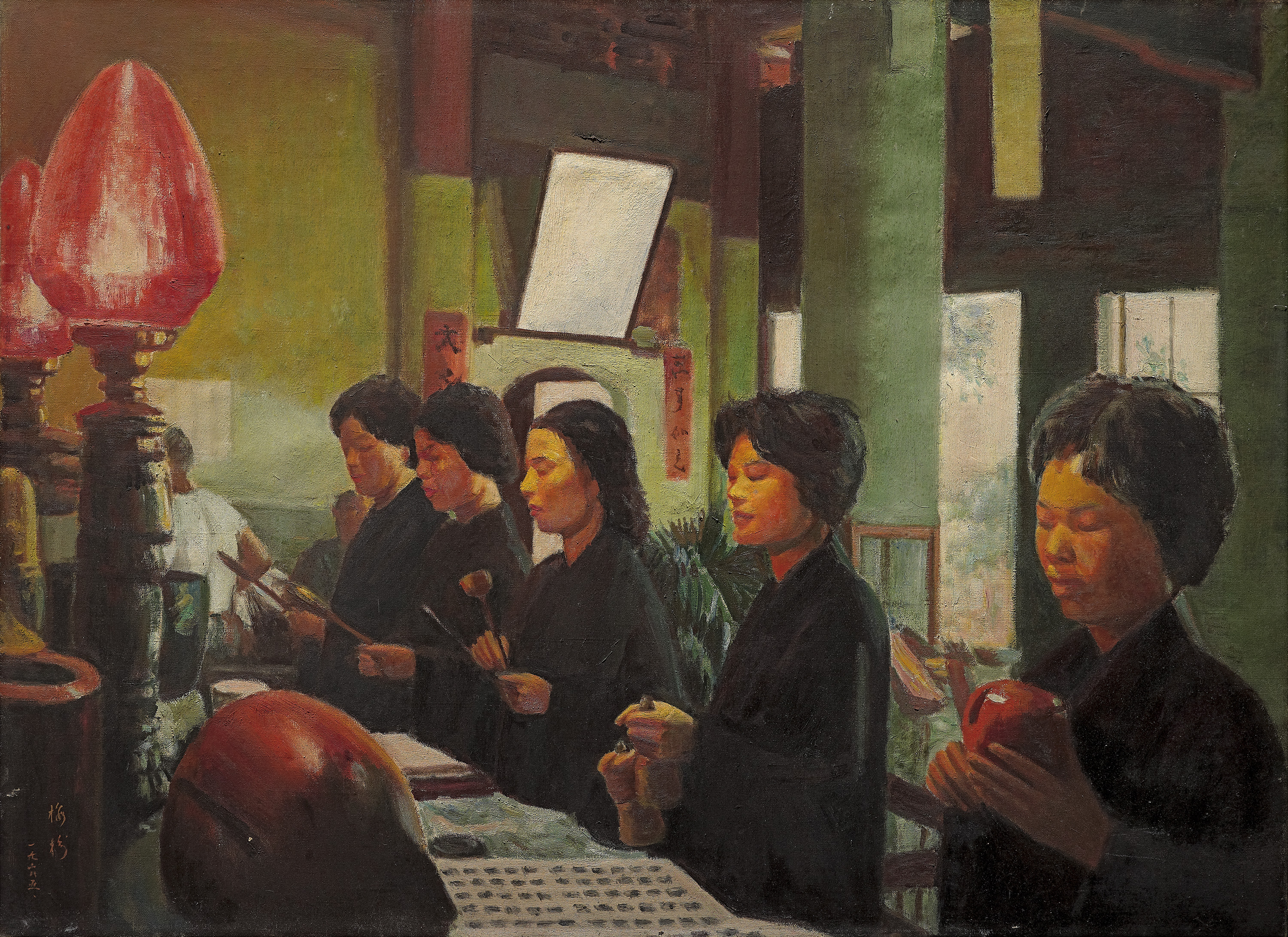
Chanting the Buddhist Scriptures, by Taiwanese painter Li Mei-shu

Mahāyāna sūtras, especially those of the Prajñāpāramitā genre, teach the importance of the practice of the six perfections (pāramitā) as part of the path to Buddhahood, and special attention is given to the perfection of wisdom (prajñāpāramitā) which is seen as primary. The importance of developing bodhicitta, which refers to a mind that is aimed at full awakening (i.e. Buddhahood) is also stressed.

Another central practice advocated by the Mahāyāna sūtras is focused around "the acquisition of merit, the universal currency of the Buddhist world, a vast quantity of which was believed to be necessary for the attainment of Buddhahood".

According to David Drewes, Mahāyāna sūtras teach simple religious practices that are supposed to make Buddhahood easy to achieve. Some of the most widely taught practices taught in Mahāyāna sūtras include:

- hearing the names of certain Buddhas or bodhisattvas, or reciting their name
- maintaining Buddhist precepts, including new bodhisattva precepts
- listening to, memorizing, reciting, preaching, worshiping and copying Mahāyāna sūtras,
- rejoicing (anumodana) in the collected meritorious actions of all previous Buddhas and other beings.

Another innovative "shortcut" to Buddhahood in Mahāyāna sutras are what are often called Pure Land practices. These involve the invocation of Buddhas such as Amitabha and Aksobhya, who are said to have created "Buddha fields" or "pure lands" especially so that those beings who wish to be reborn there can easily and quickly become Buddhas. Reciting certain sūtras, along with meditating on and reciting the names of these Buddhas can allow one to be reborn in these pure buddha-fields. Once there, one can hear the Dharma directly from a Buddha and train in the bodhisattva path in a pure place without disturbances.

The study of Mahāyāna sūtras is central to East Asian Buddhism, where they are widely read. In Tibetan Buddhism meanwhile, there is a greater emphasis on the study of Mahāyāna śāstras (philosophical treatises), which are seen as more systematic ways of studying the content found in the sūtras.

=== Textual practices ===
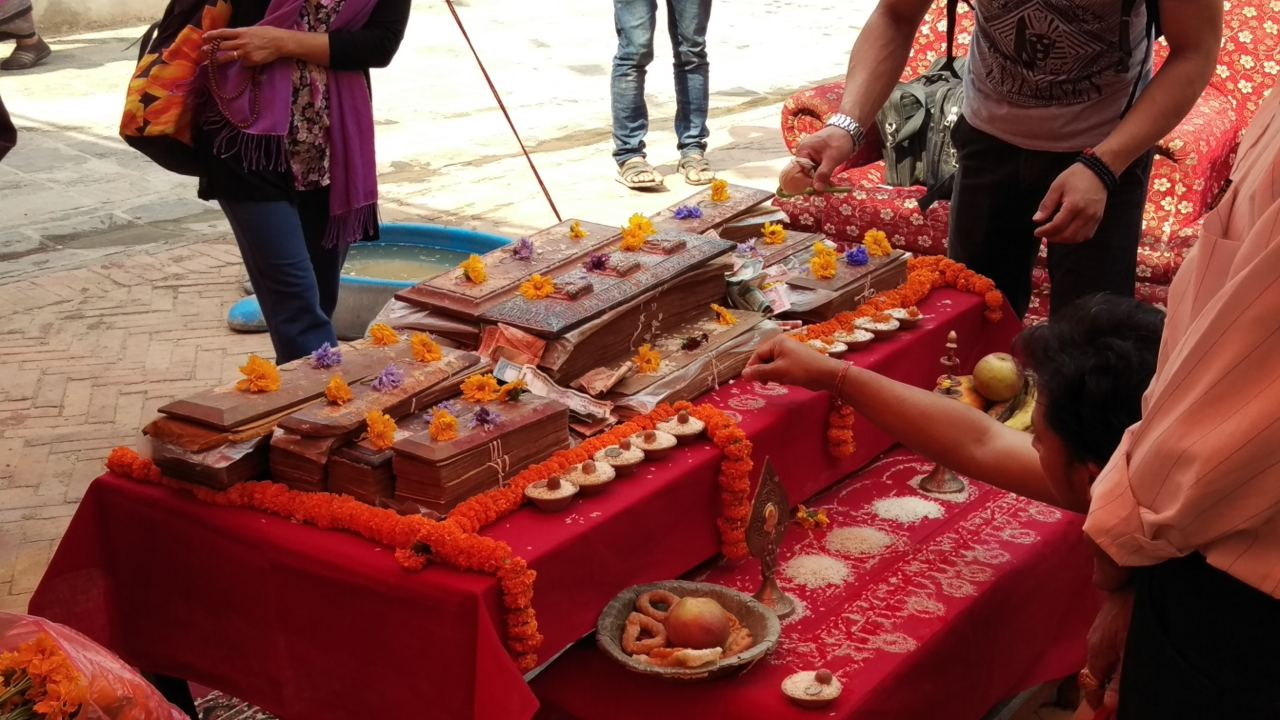
Nepalese Buddhist pūjā worshiping the Navagrantha (the nine most sacred texts in Newar Buddhism).

Numerous Mahayana sutras teach the veneration and recitation of the sutras themselves as a religious icon and as an embodiment of the Dharma and the Buddha. In Indian Mahayana Buddhism, the worship of sutras, like the Prajñāpāramitā sutra books (pustaka) and manuscripts became an important part of Mahayana practice which was considered to bring wisdom, merit and apotropaic protection from harm. This practice is promoted in some of the sutras themselves.

The Prajñāpāramitā sutras promote the copying, reading, recitation, contemplation, and distribution of the sutra, and they also teach its worship and veneration. The Aṣṭasāhasrikā Prajñāpāramitā Sūtra states:

Here, the sons or daughters of good family are enjoined to put up a copy of the Prajñāpāramitā on an altar, and to pay respect to it, to revere, worship and adore it, pay regard and reverence to it with flowers, incense, powders, umbrellas, banners, bells, and rows of burning lamps.

Ritual chanting of the Heart Sutra in Sōji-ji Temple in Yokohama, Japan

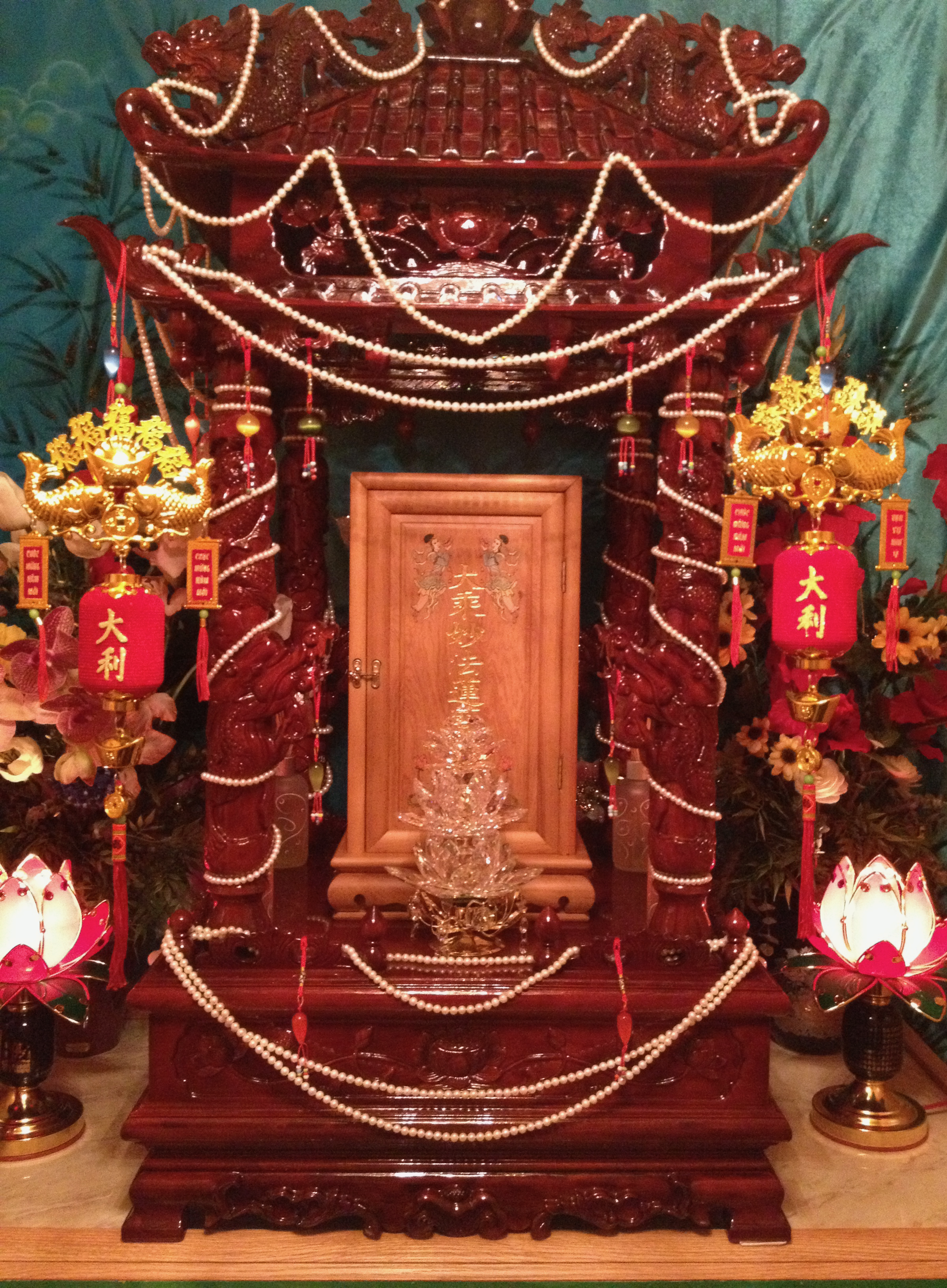
The Lotus Sutra enshrined in a Vietnamese Buddhist temple, Ksitigarbha (Dia Tang) Temple in Lynnwood, Washington

The Prajñāpāramitā sutras also reference themselves as the highest object of study and worship, claiming that studying, reciting, and worshiping them is superior to worshiping stupas, Buddha relics, and other objects. The Aṣṭasāhasrikā Prajñāpāramitā claims that this is because "the relics of the Tathāgata have come forth from this perfection of wisdom". Since the very concept of Prajñāpāramitā (transcendent knowledge, perfection of wisdom) is linked with the texts themselves, the texts were considered to have a mystic power within, which is the source of all the merit in the other religious objects, like Buddha relics.

Furthermore, Mahayana sutras like the Aṣṭasāhasrikā often claim that the Buddha is present in the text. For example the Aṣṭasāhasrikā says that "when a pūja is done to the Prajñāpāramitā, it is a pūja to the venerable past, present, and future Buddhas." This sutra also states that wherever the sutra itself is placed or recited, it makes the ground a caitya (a sacred space, shrine, sanctuary). According to Jacob Kinnard, Prajñāpāramitā sutras even present their physical form (as books, manuscripts, etc) as being akin to the Buddha's rūpakāya (physical form to be worshiped, like his relics) as well as being his dharmakāya (which contains the Dharma, the Buddha's teachings).

The Aṣṭasāhasrikā Prajñāpāramitā further states:

One might hear this deep perfection of wisdom being spoken, being taught, being explained, being pointed out, and having heard it here he might bring forth the designation 'Teacher' with regard to this perfection of wisdom—he thinks, 'The Teacher is face to face with me, the Teacher is seen by me.'

Since the sutras teach and lead one to perfect wisdom, and perfect wisdom was considered to be the mother of all Buddhas, then to honor and to know the text was to honor and to know the Buddha. As such, the Aṣṭasāhasrikā states:

In the same way in which you, Ānanda, honor me, who is now the Tathāgata...so also, Ānanda, this perfection of wisdom is to be [always] spread, praised, worshipped, venerated, respected, honored, protected, copied, recited, explained, taught, pointed out, advanced, studied, spoken, and elevated, with the same solicitude, affection, respect, and in the same virtuous spirit....But, in short, in the same way in which I am your teacher, so is the perfection of wisdom.

The worship of Mahayana sutra books and even in anthropomorphic form (through deities like Prajñāpāramitā Devi) remains important in many Mahayana Buddhist traditions, including Newar Buddhism, Tibetan Buddhism and East Asian Buddhism. This is often done in rituals in which the sutras (or a deity representing the sutra) are presented various types of offerings. The sutra may then be chanted (partially or completely), though sometimes, a mantra representing the sutra or just the title of the sutra is recited. For example, the practice of chanting the title of the Lotus Sutra (called the Daimoku) is the central practice in Nichiren Buddhism, a form of Mahayana which focuses on the veneration of this sutra. In the Huayan tradition meanwhile, a central practice is the recitation and copying of the Avatamsaka Sutra (which is often done in a group setting or on solitary retreat).

== Key Mahāyāna Sūtras ==
=== Proto-Mahayana sutras ===
The Ajitasena Sūtra has been called "Proto-Mahāyāna" by Paul Williams. While it promotes Buddhahood for all, the text lacks the usual antagonism towards the śravakas and arhats, as is typical of later Mahāyāna texts like the Vimalakīrti-nirdeśa Sūtra. It also lacks any self-awareness of itself as being part of "Mahāyāna." It promotes giving to monks like any non-Mahāyāna text, but also includes the depiction of a prince who has visions of many Buddhafields (including Sukhavati and Abhirati) on becoming an arhat.

The Salistamba Sūtra (rice stalk or rice sapling sūtra) has been considered one of the first Mahayana sutras. According to N. Ross Reat, this sutra has many parallels with the material in the Pali suttas (especially the Mahatanha-sahkhaya sutta, M1:256-71), and could date as far back as 200 BCE. It is possible that this sutra represents a period of Buddhist literature before Mahāyāna doctrine had diverged significantly from the doctrines of the early Buddhist texts.

=== Prajñāpāramitā Sūtras ===
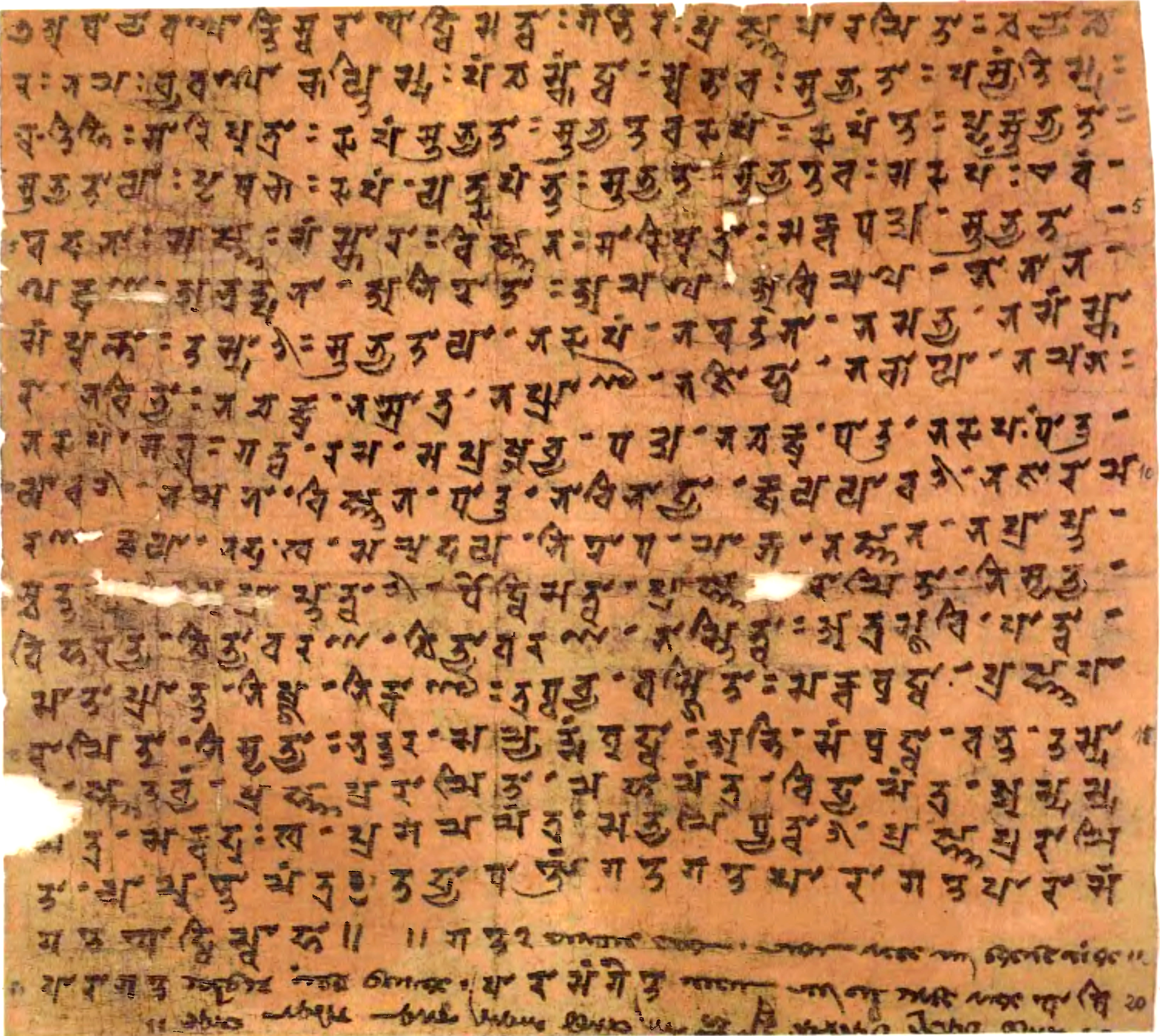
Sanskrit manuscript of the Heart Sūtra in the Siddhaṃ script. Bibliothèque nationale de France.

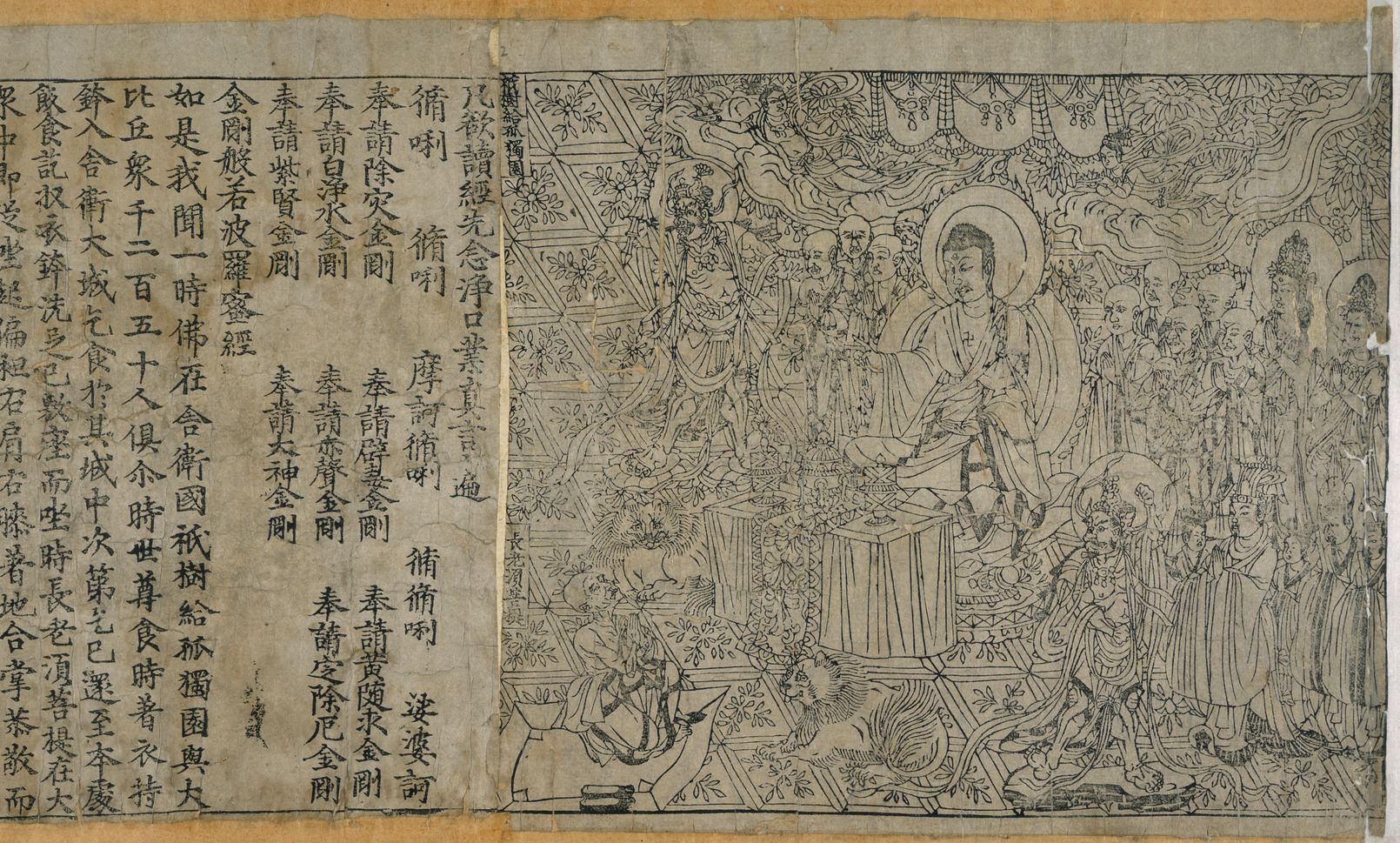
The world's earliest printed book is a Chinese translation of the Vajracchedikā Prajñāpāramitā Sūtra from Dunhuang (circa 868 CE).

Some of the Prajñāpāramitā Sūtras are considered to be some of the earliest Mahāyāna Sūtras. Various Western scholars generally hold that the Aṣṭasāhasrikā Prajñāpāramitā Sūtra is one of the earliest of these texts (c. 1st century BCE). The Vajracchedikā Prajñāpāramitā Sūtra is also seen by scholars like Schopen and numerous Japanese scholars as being very early.

Paul Williams also notes that in Lewis Lancaster's analysis of the earliest Chinese versions of the Aṣṭasāhasrikā Prajñāpāramitā Sūtra "a number of key Mahayana concepts are missing from the earliest versions although present in later versions. The world of the earliest Aṣṭasāhasrika is reasonably close to that of the pre-Mahayana traditions."

The main topics of these Sūtras are the path of the bodhisattva, the six transcendent virtues and, in particular, transcendent wisdom (prajñāpāramitā) the most important of these. The bodhisattva "mahasattva" (great being) is a being who is training towards full Buddhahood for the benefit of all. "Transcendent Wisdom" (also: the "Perfection of Wisdom") meanwhile, means the ability to see reality as it truly is, a deep and liberating spiritual knowledge that is the source of all virtues. Prajñāpāramitā is thus "a state of consciousness which understands emptiness (shunyata), the absence of 'self' or intrinsic nature even in dharmas." Since all phenomena (even Nirvana) lack any essence, unchanging core or independence, they are merely conceptual constructs and as such, they are like magical illusions (maya).

Many of these sutras are known by the number of lines, or ślokas, that they contain, such as the Pañcaviṃśatisāhasrikā (25,000 line) PP Sūtra, the Aṣṭadaśasāhasrikā (18,000 lines), and the Śatasāhasrikā (100,000 lines) etc.

=== The White Lotus Sūtra ===
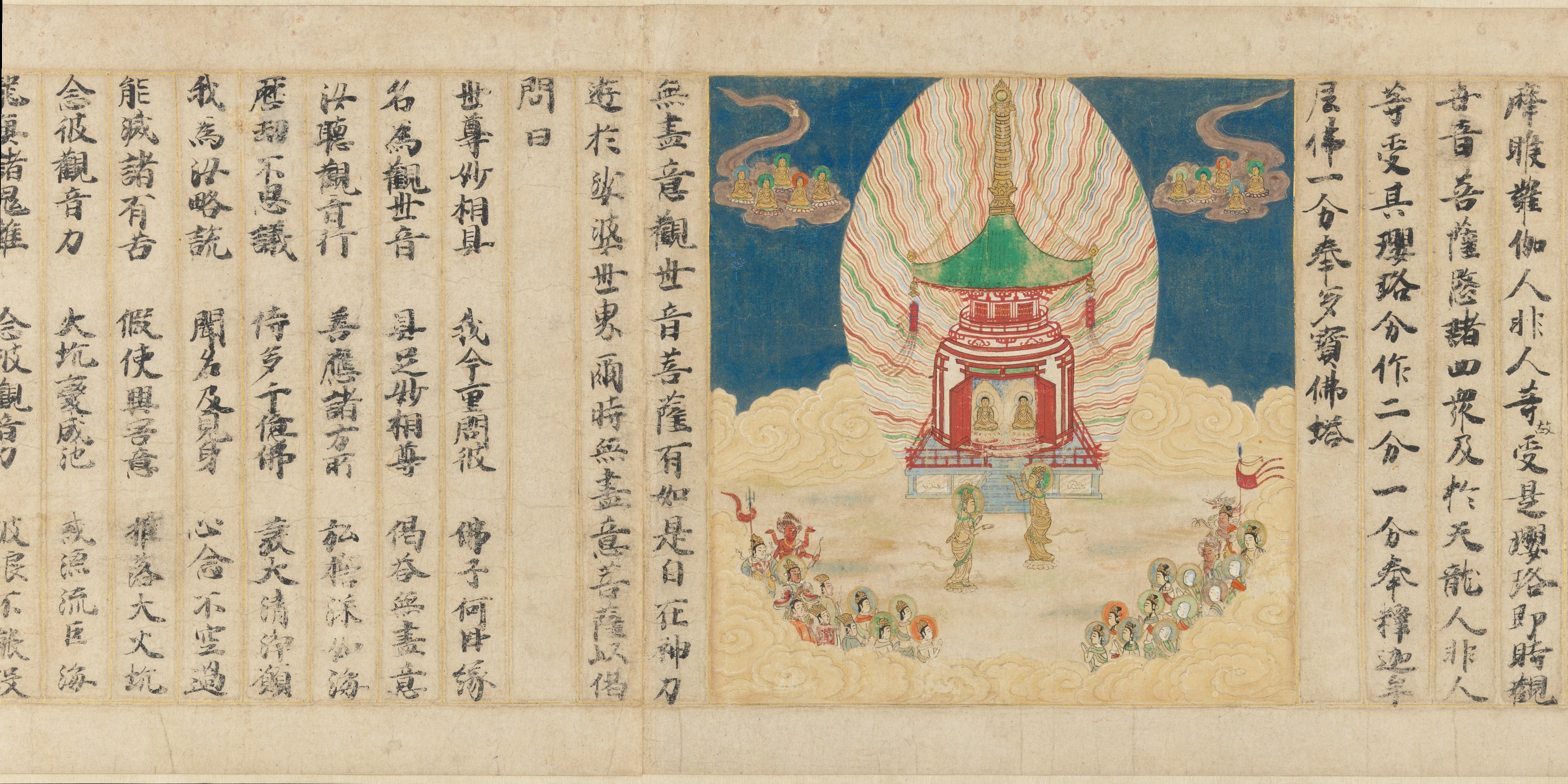
The floating jeweled stupa; illustrated Lotus Sutra, Japan 1257

The Saddharma-pundarīka-sūtra (True Dharma White Lotus Sūtra) is a very influential Sūtra, especially in East Asian Buddhism, where it is considered the supreme Sūtra by many East Asian Buddhists (especially in the Tiantai and Nichiren schools).

Probably written down between 100 BCE –150 CE, the Lotus Sūtra states that the three yānas (śrāvakayāna, pratyekabuddhayāna and bodhisattvayāna) are not real paths leading to different goals, there is in fact only one path (ekayāna), with one goal - Buddhahood. The sutra predicts that all those who hear the Dharma will eventually achieve this goal. The earlier teachings are said to be skilful means to teach beings according to their capacities.

The sutra is notable for the idea that a Buddha is not inaccessible after his parinirvāṇa since a Buddha's life-span is incalculably long. Instead of passing into a totally transcendent state, a Buddha remains to help all sentient beings in countless ways, like a great spiritual father that has been around for eons and will continue to teach for many more eons to come.

In some East Asian traditions, the Lotus Sūtra has been compiled together with two other sutras which serve as a prologue and epilogue, respectively the Innumerable Meanings Sutra and the Samantabhadra Meditation Sutra. This composite sutra is often called the Threefold Lotus Sūtra or Three-Part Dharma Flower Sutra.

=== Buddhafield Sūtras ===
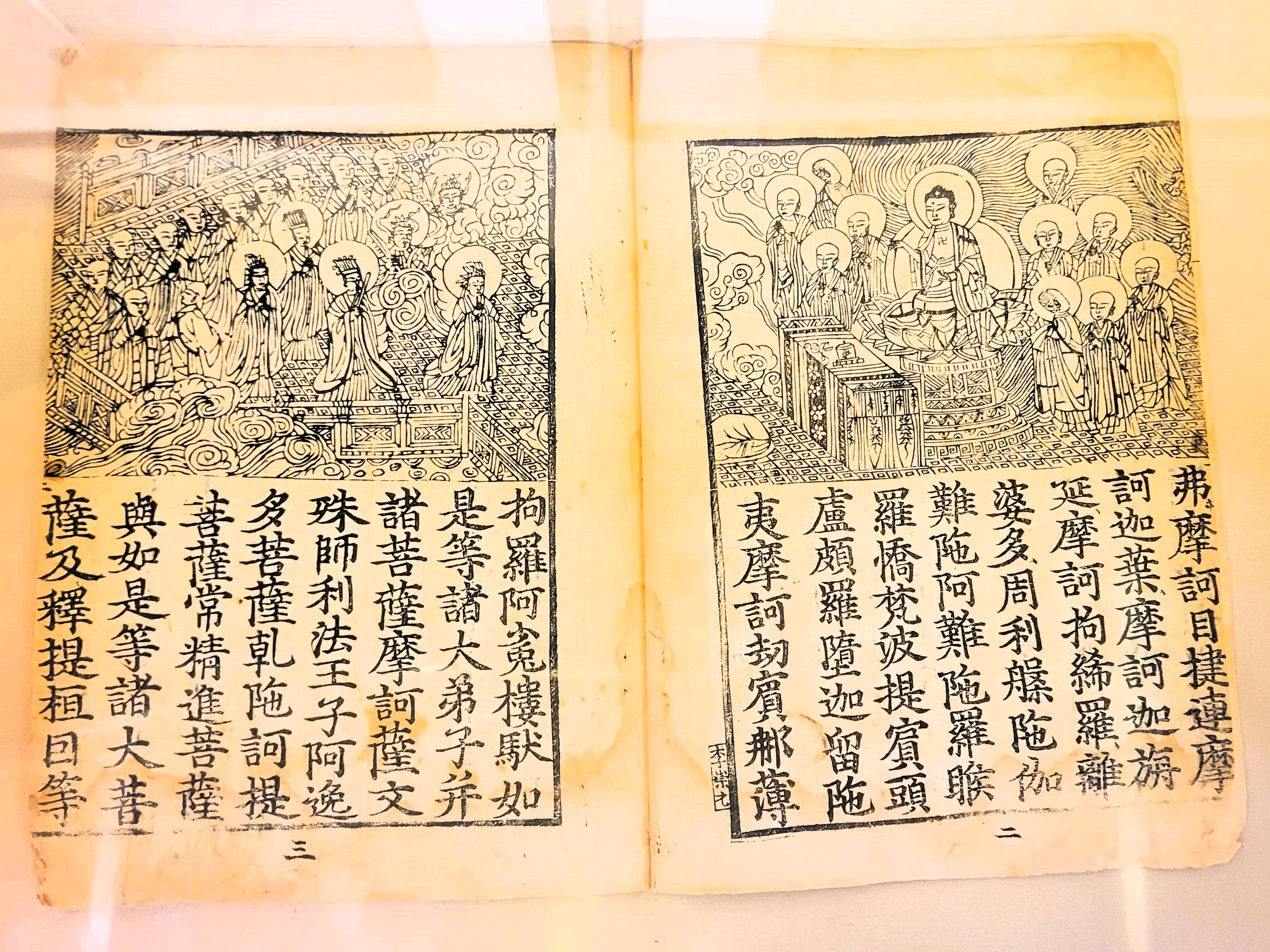
Illustrated Amitabha Sutra, Korea, Deokjusa Temple

Several sutras focus on the pure buddhafields (viśuddhabuddhakṣetra) or a Buddha's "pure lands" (as they are known in Chinese translation). The most popular of these are three sutras that deal with the pure land of Amitābha Buddha, called Sukhāvatī (the Blissful). These texts are very influential in East Asia, particularly in Pure Land Buddhism, which focuses on the salvific power of faith in Amitābha's salvific vow-power (pūrva-praṇidhāna-vaśa, the power of his past vows) to effortlessly transport all beings who think of him to his pure land.

The three main "Pure land sutras" in East Asian Pure Land Buddhism are:

- Long Sukhāvatīvyūha (also known as the Sutra of Immeasurable Life)
- Short Sukhāvatīvyūha (also known as the Sutra of Immeasurable Light)
- Amitāyus Contemplation Sūtra

Furthermore, there are also other sutras which teach about other Buddhas and their pure lands, though they are not as influential as the Amitabha sutras. They include the Bhaiṣajyaguru-vaiḍūryaprabhārāja Sūtra, which focuses on Bhaiṣajyaguru, a healing Buddha also known as the "Medicine Buddha"; as well as the Akṣobhyatathāgata-syavyūha Sūtra, which focuses on the Buddha Akṣobhya and his pure land of Abhirati (which is one of the oldest "Pure land" texts).

=== Samādhi Sūtras ===
Amongst the earliest Mahāyāna texts, the "Samādhi Sūtras" are a group of sutras that focus on the attainment of profound states of consciousness reached in meditation (samādhi, "meditative absorption, concentration"), perhaps suggesting that meditation played an important role in the development of early Mahāyāna. However, in these texts, the term "samādhi" general signifies a more complex and diverse idea which includes numerous practices that are not purely contemplative.

"Samādhi Sūtras" include:

- Pratyutpannabuddha Saṃmukhāvasthita Samādhi Sūtra (Samādhi for Directly Encountering the Buddhas of the Present Sūtra)
- Samādhirāja-sūtra (King of Samādhis Sūtra)
- Śūraṅgama-samādhi-sūtra (Samādhi of the Heroic Progression Sūtra)
- Sarvapuṇyasamuccayasamādhi (The Absorption that Encapsulates All Merit)
- The Absorption of the Miraculous Ascertainment of Peace (Praśāntaviniścayaprātihāryasamādhi)

=== Visualization and Meditation Sūtras ===
There is also another genre of Mahāyāna meditation texts called Visualization Sutras (Chinese: 觀經, guan jing). A key feature of these sutras is their promotion of meditation practices which focus on mentally visualizing or maintaining a mental image. Perhaps the most popular of these is the Sutra on the Contemplation of the Buddha of Immeasurable Life. Others include the Sutra on the Sea of Samādhi Attained through Contemplation of the Buddha (Guan Fo Sanmei Hai Jing), and the Sutra on the Contemplation of the Cultivation Methods of the Bodhisattva Samantabhadra (Guan Puxian Pusa Xingfa Jing), commonly known as Samantabhadra Contemplation Sutra.

There are also some meditation focused texts called Dhyāna Sūtras (禪経) translated into Chinese by figures like Kumarajiva. Some of these Sūtras contain Mahāyāna meditation teachings.

=== Buddhāvataṃsaka Sūtra ===
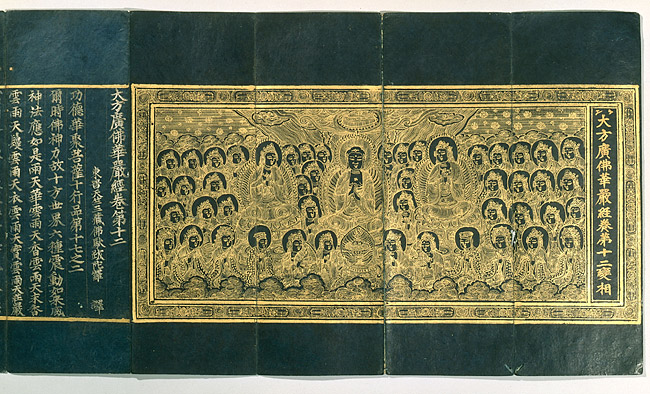
Goryeo Buddhāvataṃsaka manuscript, 14th century

There are also various composite "sūtras," which are actually large collections of other sūtras. One quite influential composite sūtra is the Buddhāvataṃsaka Sūtra (The Buddha Wreath Sūtra), a large text contraining numerous chapters on varying topics, some of which circulated separately as independent sūtras before being joined into the mature Buddhāvataṃsaka. The largest and most influential of these include the Daśabhūmika Sūtra and the Gaṇḍavyūha Sūtra. The Buddhāvataṃsaka probably reached its current form by about the 4th century CE, and this compilation may have happened in Central Asia.

Williams notes that the Buddhāvataṃsaka sutra includes both the Yogacara mind-only teaching and the emptiness doctrine, but does so mainly from the perspective of highly advanced beings who have spiritually realized these teachings through deep meditative absorption, and thus have all sorts of magical powers which they use to help others. The Buddhāvataṃsaka is therefore a text that depicts various mystical visionary scenes, with countless world systems and countless Buddhas and bodhisattvas who travel freely throughout this multiverse helping all beings out of compassion. One of the most important Buddhas in this text is Mahāvairocana ("Great Illuminator"), who fills the entire cosmos with his light, his omniscient awareness and his magical emanations (one of which was Shakyamuni Buddha). In China, the Buddhāvataṃsaka became the central text for the Huayen (Jp. Kegon) school of Buddhism, which later went on to influence Chinese Chan Buddhism and Pure Land Buddhism.

=== Mahāratnakūṭa and Mahāsamnipāta Sūtras ===
Two other important Mahāyāna "sūtras" which are also collections of smaller independent sūtras are the Mahāratnakūṭa Sūtra (The Heap of Jewels Sūtra) which contains 49 individual sūtras, and the Mahāsamnipāta Sūtra (Sūtra of the Great Assembly) which is a collection of 17 sūtras.

Important sutras in the Mahāratnakūṭa include the Bodhisattvapiṭaka, the Śrīmālādevī Siṃhanāda Sūtra, the Longer Sukhāvatī-vyūha Sutra, the Akṣobhya-vyūha, Ugraparipṛcchā Sūtra (The inquiry of Ugra), the Saptaśatikā (700 Line) Prajñāpāramitā Sūtra, and the Tathāgataguhya Sūtra (The Secrets of the Tathāgata). Important sutras in the Mahāsamnipāta include larger works like the Akṣayamati-nirdeśa, and the Gaganagañja-paripṛcchā, which themselves also circulated as independent sutras.

=== Hagiographical sutras about the Buddha ===
Some Mahayana sutras focus on the hagiography of the Buddha, other Buddhas, or even tell stories of numerous Buddhas. The Lalitavistara Sūtra is one of the most important of the hagiographical sutras. It focuses on the story of Shakyamuni Buddha's final birth.

The Karuṇāpuṇḍarīka Sūtra (White Lotus of Compassion Sutra) is another hagiographical sutra which tells a story about a key event in the past life of Shakyamuni Buddha.

The Bhadrakalpika Sūtra give a list of over one thousand Buddhas which will arise in this "fortunate aeon".

=== Sūtras on specific bodhisattvas ===
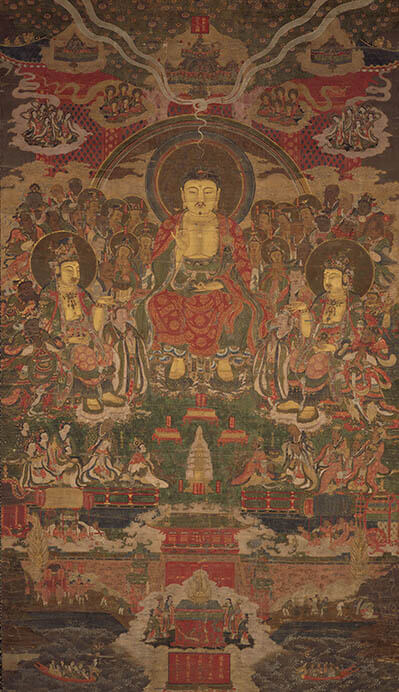
A Goryeo (918–1392) illustration of the Descent of Maitreya Sutra, Myomanji, Kyoto, Japan

A large number of Sūtras focus on the nature, teachings and virtues of a particular bodhisattva. They include:

- Sūtras which focus on the bodhisattva Mañjuśrī and his teachings, such as the Mañjuśrī-buddhakṣetra-guṇavyūha (Array of Mañjushri's Buddhaland).
- Sutras which focus on Avalokitesvara, like the Sūtra of the Prophecy Bestowed upon Avalokiteśvara Bodhisattva
- The Amoghapāśa sūtras (a special form of Avalokitesvara)
- The Kṣitigarbhasūtra, which focuses on the bodhisattva Kṣitigarbha.
- Sūtras which focus on the bodhisattva Ākāśagarbha.
- Sūtras which focus on Maitreya, such as the Maitreyavyakarana (Maitreya Prophecy) and The Sutra That Expounds the Descent of Maitreya Buddha (Taisho 454).
- The Samantabhadra Meditation Sūtra

=== Yogācāra Sūtras ===
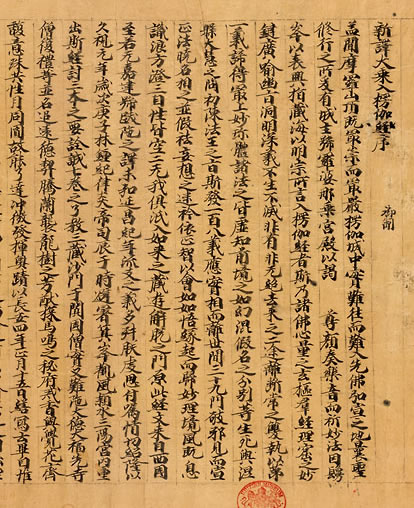
Copy of the Laṅkāvatāra Sūtra from Dunhuang in the British Library

These sutras primarily teach doctrines associated with the Yogācāra school, such as the doctrine of vijñapti-mātra (ideas-only, impressions-only etc.), which states that there can only ever be awareness of mental images or impressions which manifest themselves as external objects, but are not actually external to the mind.

The Ārya-saṃdhi-nirmocana-Sūtra (Noble sūtra of the Explanation of the Profound Secrets, c. 2nd century CE) is the earliest surviving sutra in this class, and its the main text. It divides the teachings of the Buddha into three types, which it calls the "three turnings of the wheel of Dharma." To the first turning, it ascribes the Āgamas of the śravakas, to the second turning the lower Mahāyāna sutras including the Prajñāpāramitā sutras, and finally sutras like itself are deemed to comprise the third turning. Moreover, the first two turnings are considered to be provisional (neyārtha) in this system of classification, while the third group is said to present the final truth without a need for further explication (nītārtha).

Another Indian Yogācāra sutra is the Buddhabhūmi Sūtra (Sutra on the Buddha Land). This sutra was important enough in India to have at least two Indian Yogācāra commentaries written on it, Śīlabhadra's Buddhabhūmi-vyākhyāna and Bandhuprabha's Buddhabhūmyupadeśa. This text is also an important source of Indian Pure Land Buddhist ideas.

The Laṅkāvatāra Sūtra (c. 4th century CE) and the Ghanavyūha Sūtra, are also seen as sūtras associated with the Yogācāra tradition. However both are somewhat syncretic in nature, combining Yogācāra doctrines with those of the buddha-nature texts. In particular, both sutras associate the tathāgatagarbha (i.e. buddha-nature) with the Yogācāra doctrine of the storehouse consciousness (alayavijñāna). The Laṅkāvatāra Sūtra was particularly influential for Chan Buddhism.

=== The Vimalakirtinirdeśa ===
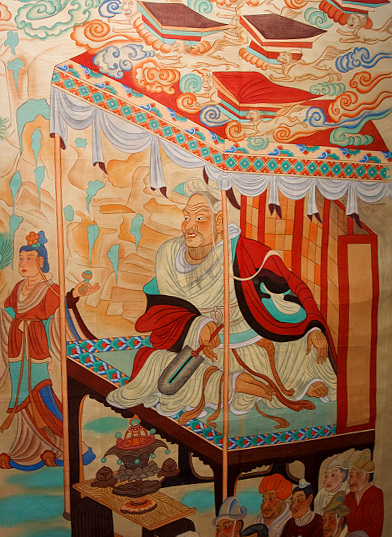
The layman Vimalakīrti debates Manjusri, Dunhuang Mogao Caves

In the Vimalakirtinirdeśa, composed some time between the first and second century CE, the bodhisattva Vimalakīrti appears as a layman to teach the Dharma. This is seen by some as a strong assertion of the value of lay practice. The sutra teaches, among other subjects, the meaning of non-dualism, the doctrine of the true body of the Buddha, the characteristically Mahāyāna claim that the appearances of the world are mere illusions, and the superiority of the Mahāyāna over other paths. It places in the mouth of the lay practitioner Vimalakīrti a teaching addressed to both arhats and bodhisattvas, regarding the doctrine of śūnyatā. In most versions, the discourse of the text culminates with a wordless teaching of silence. This sutra has been very popular in China and Japan.

=== Buddha-nature Sūtras ===
The class of texts called "Tathāgatagarbha sūtras" teach the important Mahāyāna doctrine of Tathāgatagarbha, (Tathāgata-embryo, Tathāgata-womb, Inner Tathāgata, also known as Sugatagarbha) and Buddha-dhatu (Buddha nature, Buddha source, Buddha element). According to Williams, this doctrine states that all beings "have a Tathāgata [i.e. a Buddha] within them, in seed or embryo, that sentient beings are the wombs or matrices of the Tathāgata, or that they have a Tathāgata as their essence, core, or essential inner nature."

The earliest of these texts have been seen by modern scholars as including the Mahāyāna Mahāparinirvāṇa Sūtra (not to be confused with the Pāli Mahaparinibbana Sutta and its parallels) and the Tathāgatagarbha Sūtra (however, the dating of these texts is far from settled).

Other important sutras in this genre include the Śrīmālā Sūtra, the Aṅgulimālīya Sūtra, the Anūnatvāpurnatvanirdeśa (The Teaching on the Absence of Increase and Decrease), the Mahābherī Sūtra (Great Drum), and the Mahāmegha Sūtra (Great Cloud Sutra) .

=== Ethical Discipline Sūtras ===
These focus on principles that guide the ethical behaviour (Śīla) of bodhisattvas and the bodhisattva precepts, and include the Kāshyapa-parivarta, the Bodhisattva-prātimokṣa Sutra, the Upāliparipṛcchā (also known in Chinese as The Buddha Speaks of Decisive Vinaya Sutra) and the Brahmajāla Sutra (or Brahmajāla Bodhisattva Śīla Sūtra). For East Asian Zen monastics, the Bequeathed Teachings Sutra is a widely chanted and studied text on ethical discipline. Yet there is also the Noble Mahāyāna Sūtra, Purification of Karmic Obscurations (Karmāvaraṇaviśuddhi) describing “the monk Stainless Light, who had been seduced by a prostitute and feels strong remorse for having violated his vows” after which “the Buddha explains the lack of inherent nature of all phenomena and the luminous nature of mind.”

=== Confession Sūtras ===
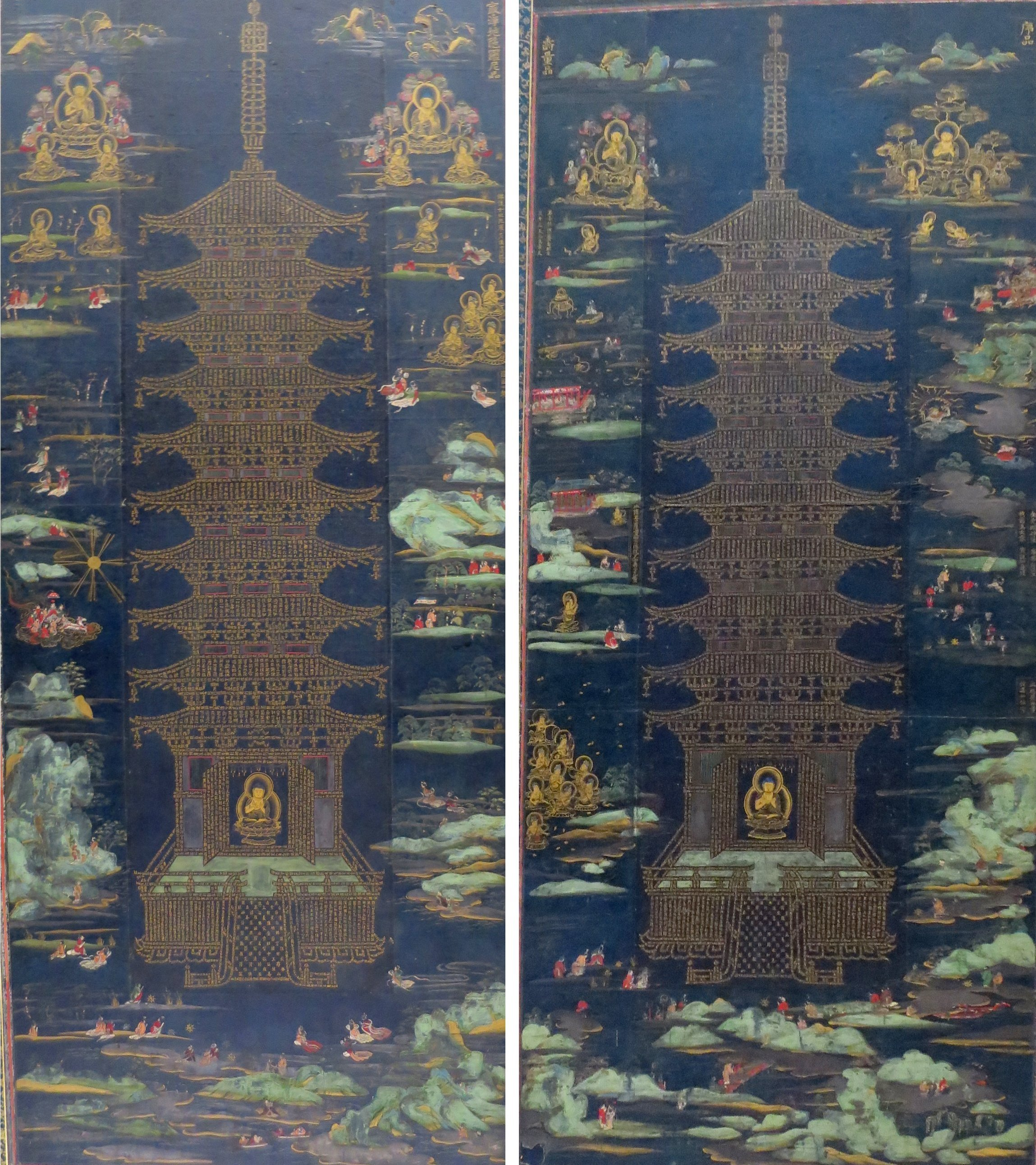
Jeweled pagoda mandala from a copy of the Golden Light Sutra. Japan, Heian period, 12th century.

The Sutra of the Three Heaps (Sanskrit: Triskandhadharmasutra) and the Golden Light Sutra (Suvarṇaprabhāsa-sūtra) focus on the practice of confession of faults. The Golden Light Sutra became especially influential in East Asian Buddhism, particularly because of its teaching on how the Four Heavenly Kings protect the ruler who governs his country in the proper manner and upholds the sutra.

The Sutra of the Three Heaps meanwhile remains an important confession focused sutra in Tibetan Buddhism.

=== Dhāraṇī sutras ===
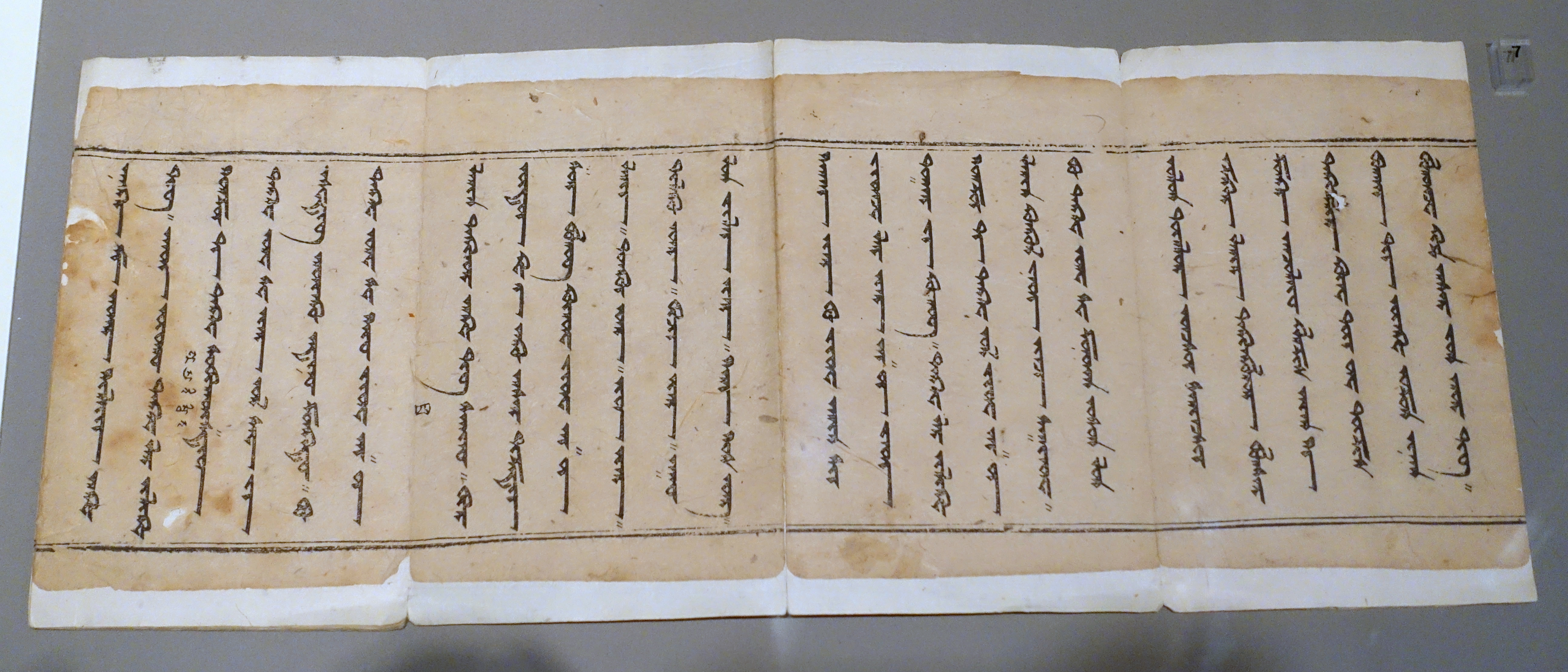
Uṣṇīṣa Vijaya Dhāraṇī, Old Turkic in Uighur script with comments in Brahmi, Murtuk, 13th-14th century

Dhāraṇī sutras are Mahayana sutras that focus on specific dhāraṇīs (recitations, chants, incantations, spells), which are mostly in some form of Buddhist Hybrid Sanskrit. Dhāraṇīs are understood as having various magical powers, including protection against evil, purification, promotion of good rebirth, generation of merit, and even enlightenment. The word dhāraṇī derives from a Sanskrit root √dhṛ meaning "to hold or maintain".

The Dhāraṇī sutra genre is ancient, and similar works can be found in even non-Mahayana Buddhist canons, one example being the Atanatiya Sutra. Several early Buddhist schools had also maintained a collection of scriptures focused on dhāraṇī and magical practices, sometimes called Dhāraṇī Piṭaka or called the Vidyādhara Piṭaka (Wizardry Collection) which included various types of rituals and spells (vidyā). For example, the Dharmaguptaka school's Tripiṭaka is said to have contained a Dhāraṇī Piṭaka. The Mahayana Dhāraṇī sutras developed out of this ancient Buddhist magical tradition. While many classic Mahayana sutras (like the Lotus and Golden Light) contain dhāraṇī, Dhāraṇī sutras are focused specifically on dhāraṇī practice and associated rites.

Mahayana dhāraṇī literature became popular in East Asia in the first millennium CE, with Chinese records suggesting their profusion by the early centuries of the common era. These migrated from China to Korea and Japan. The demand for printed dhāraṇī led to innovations in block printing. Today, the recitation of dhāraṇī remains a major part of Mahayana Buddhist practice, and they are also used as amulets and protective charms.

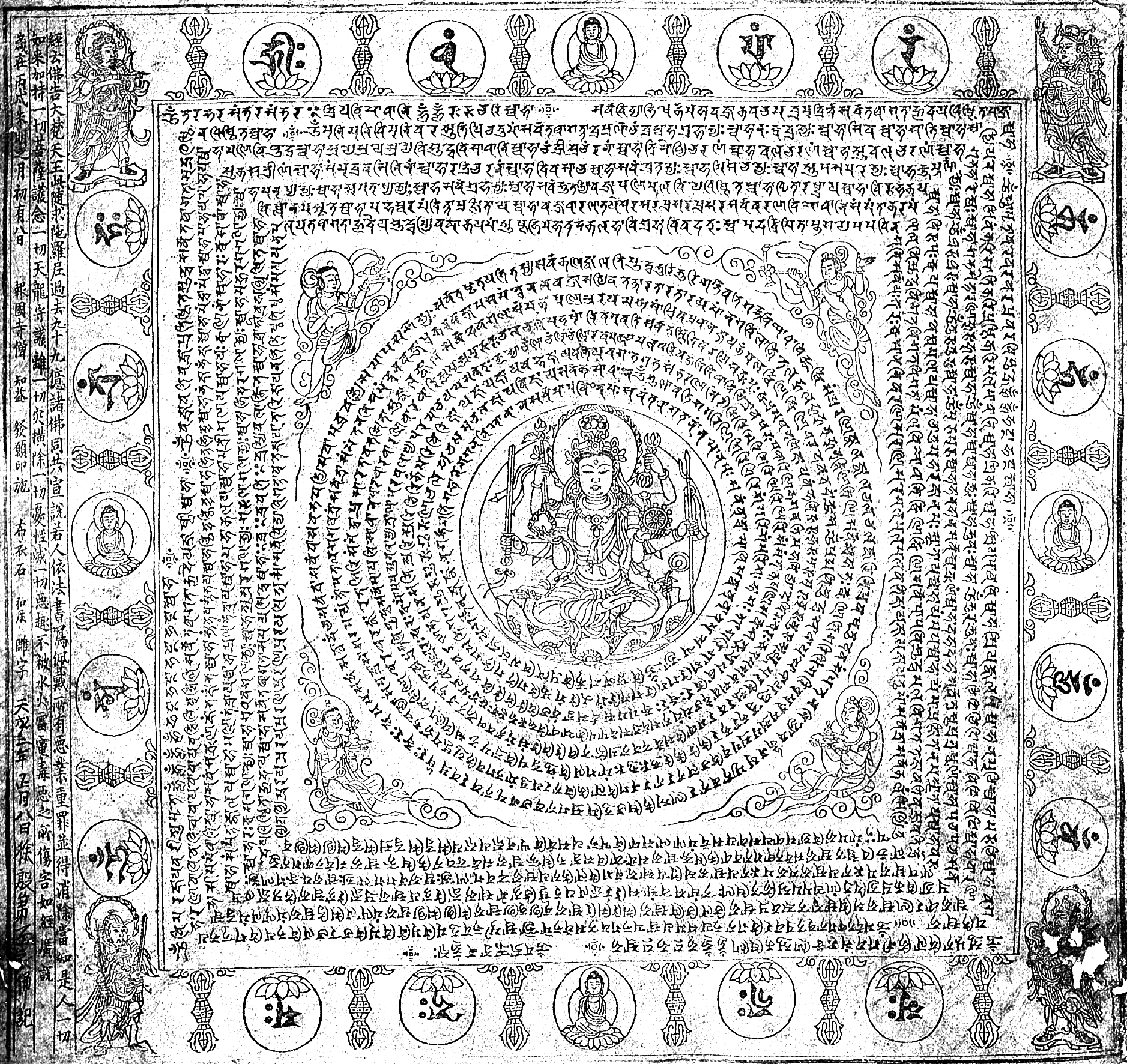
A Chinese illustration of the apotropaic Mahāpratisarādhāraṇī, in Sanskrit and Siddhaṃ script, Later Tang, 927 CE

Some important dhāraṇī texts include:

- Uṣṇīṣa Vijaya Dhāraṇī Sūtra (Dhāraṇī of Victorious Uṣṇīṣa)
- Nīlakaṇṭha Dhāraṇī (Dhāraṇī of the Blue Necked One)
- Cundī Dhāraṇī Sūtra
- Eleven-Faced Avalokitesvara Heart Dharani Sūtra (Avalokiteśvara-ekadaśamukha Dhāraṇī Sūtra)
- Amoghapāśa Dhāraṇī Sūtra (不空罥索咒經, Taishō no. 1093), first translated in 587 by Jñānagupta (ca. 522–600).
- Pañcarakṣā, five dhāraṇīs of the "Five Protectresses"
- Pure Land Rebirth Dhāraṇī
- Aparimitāyur-jñāna-suviniścita-tejo-rājāya dhāraṇī (an Amitayus dhāraṇī)
- The Great Dharani Sutra of Immaculate and Pure Light (Korean: 무구정광대다라니경; Hanja: 無垢淨光大陀羅尼經; RR: Mugu jeonggwang dae darani-gyeong) is currently the oldest surviving woodblock print in the world.
- The Cintāmaṇicakra Dhāraṇī Sūtra (Ruyilun tuoluoni jing 如意輪陀羅尼經, T. 1080) translated by Bodhiruci
- Sūtra of the Whole-Body Relic Treasure Chest Seal Dhāraṇī.

Dhāraṇī texts were often collected together into Dhāraṇī collections, such as the Dhāraṇī Saṃgraha and the Collected Dhāraṇī Sūtras (Tuoluoni jijing 陀羅尼集), Taisho Tripitaka no. 901, translated by Atikūṭa in 654.

=== Esoteric Sūtras ===
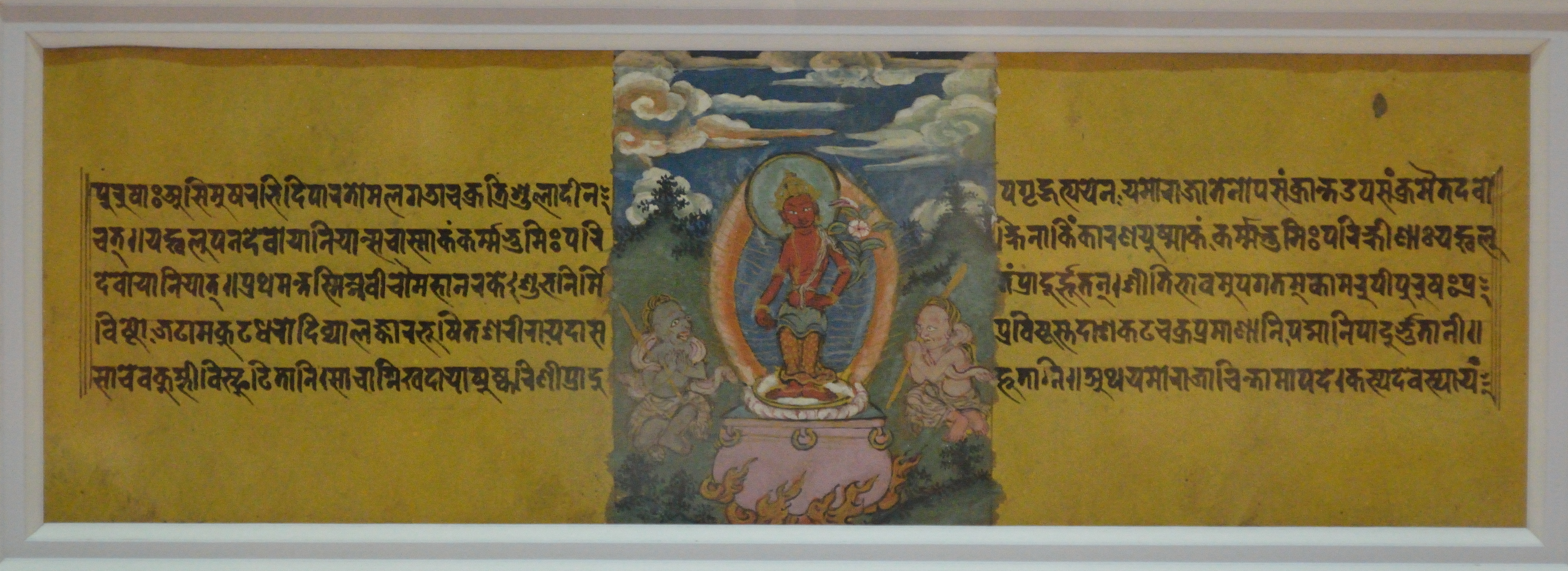
Folio from a Kāraṇḍavyūha Sūtra Manuscript, ca 14th Century CE

Esoteric Sūtras (Guhyamantra, i.e. "Secret mantra" sutras, known as 密教 Mìjiao in Chinese and Mikkyō in Japanese) comprise an important category of works that are related to mantric and esoteric Buddhist practices. Most of these differ from simpler Dhāraṇī sutras in that they contain much more elaborate ritual technology and schemas (such as the use of images, altars, fire offerings, abhiṣeka, mandalas or visualization meditations). While earlier Dhāraṇī sutras focus on the simple recitation mantric formulas, later esoteric sūtras contain descriptions of mandalas, mudras, complex rituals involving elements like bathing, setting up a ritual perimeter, and so forth. These more complex esoteric sutras developed gradually out of simpler Dhāraṇī recitation sutras.

According to Koichi Shinohara, the early "esoteric" sutras were not initially considered a separate category of "tantric" or "esoteric" sutras, and they were not seen as separate from mainstream Mahayana. By the 7th century, the complexity of the rituals had reached a new stage of mature Indian Mantric Buddhism, as seen in the Vairocanābhisaṃbodhi Sūtra.

Over time, these esoteric sutras became seen as part of a separate category of texts and even of a separate "vehicle" to liberation - the Mantrayana or Vajrayana. While the texts listed below call themselves sutras, later Buddhist traditions often reclassified these as "tantras" due to their Mantrayana content. Some important esoteric Mahayana texts include:

- The Golden Light Sutra (Suvarṇaprabhāsa-sūtra) contains perhaps the first mandala with five Buddhas, a key feature of later tantric texts. It also includes dhāraṇī and other ritual practices.
- The Śūraṅgama Sūtra, which teaches the "Sitātapatra Uṣṇīṣa Dhāraṇī" (Ch. 大白傘蓋陀羅尼) and is included in the Taisho Tripitaka's Esoteric Sutra category.
- The Kāraṇḍavyūha Sūtra, known for teaching the famous mantra of Avalokiteśvara, "Om mani padme hum" and the Cundi dhāraṇī.
- Amoghapāśa sūtras, a group of texts which include numerous rituals associated with the Lotus Buddha family and contain the important Mantra of Light.
- Vairocanābhisaṃbodhi Sūtra, one of the first mature Mantrayana sutras, a key text for Chinese Esoteric Buddhism and Shingon.
- Sarvatathāgatatattvasaṃgraha Sūtra, and the Vajraśekhara Sūtra.

Some late Prajñaparamita texts (dated to c. 8th century up to 11th century CE) also include mantric and dhāraṇī elements, and are thus known as esoteric Prajñaparamita sutras. These later esoteric Prajñāpāramitā sutras are generally short texts which contain mantras and/or dhāraṇīs and also reference esoteric Buddhist (Mantrayana) ideas. They often promote simple practices based on recitation which lead to the accumulation of merit and help one reach awakening.

Esoteric Prajñāpāramitā sutras include: Adhyardhaśatikā Prajñāpāramitā Sūtra (150 lines), the famous Heart Sutra (Prajñāpāramitāhṛdaya), the Ekaślokikā prajñāpāramitā, Svalpākṣarā Prajñāpāramitā, Kauśikā Prajñāpāramitā, Saptaślokikā Prajñāpāramitā, the *Prajñāpāramitānāmāṣṭaśataka and the Candragarbha Prajñāpāramitā.

=== Non-Indic sūtras ===
There are various sūtras that were traditionally considered to be translations from Indian sources (and which are written to mimic Indic works) but that modern scholars have now shown were most likely composed in East Asia or Central Asia. These texts may also contain colophons which claim to be translations of an Indian original. These sutras are sometimes called "apocryphal" sūtras (a term borrowed from biblical studies) by modern scholars. In Buddhist studies, the term does not necessarily carry the pejorative connotations that it may have in other contexts (and these works are certainly not considered "heretical").

According to Charles Muller, "while certain texts are fit to be classified with the 'spurious' connotations of the term apocrypha, a significant portion of them were extremely well written works, whose contents accorded with the most profound of the Buddhist doctrines." East Asian Buddhists were aware of the phenomenon of writing original works and attributing them to Indian sources. These texts were sometimes classified either as i-ching (疑經 "scriptures of doubtful authenticity") or as wei-ching (僞教 "spurious scriptures"). Chinese Buddhists like Seng-yu (僧祐; 445–518) noted these spurious works in their Buddhist text catalogues.

Some Mahayana sutras in the Chinese canon which have been influential in East Asian Buddhism and were likely composed outside of India (in whole or in part) include:

- Amitāyus Contemplation Sūtra (佛說觀無量壽佛經, Guan-wuliangshou-jing, Sutra on the Visualization of [the Buddha] Immeasurable Life), an important sutra in Pure Land Buddhism, now considered by most scholars to be a Chinese (or possibly Central Asian) composition.
- Brahma's Net Sutra (梵網經; Fànwǎng jīng), which according to Muller is now considered apocryphal by most scholars.
- Blood Bowl Sutra (血盆經; Xuèpénjīng), of Chinese origin.
- Vajrasamadhi Sūtra (金剛三昧經, Kŭmgang sammaegyŏng), traditionally seen as an Indian text, scholars have recently found that it was produced in Korea in about 685 CE.
- Innumerable Meanings Sutra (無量義經; pinyin: Wúliáng yì jīng).
- Sutra of Perfect Enlightenment (圓覺經; pinyin: Yuánjué jīng).
- Humane King Sutra (仁王經; rén wáng jīng).
- Śūraṅgama Sūtra (楞严經) - the status of this sutra is still a subject of debate. Some scholars, like Kogen Mizuno and Bernard Faure, consider it apocryphal, while others like Ronald Epstein disagree.

Since there are many apocryphal sutras in the Chinese Canon, modern scholars have developed various taxonomies of the different types of Apocryphal Sūtras. For example, according to Mochizuki Shinkō's Bukkyō kyōten seiritsushi ron, there are three main types of apocryphal Chinese "sutras". Makita Tairyō outlines five types of apocryphal sutras.

== Mahāyāna sutra commentaries ==
There are many commentaries to the Mahāyāna sutras. Some Indian commentaries survive, mostly in translation. Other commentaries were written in Chinese and Tibetan.

Important Mahāyāna sutra commentaries include:

- Commentaries on the Diamond Sutra by Asanga and Vasubandhu.
- Vasubandhu's commentaries on the Amitabha sutra (Amitayus sutropadeśa) and on the Lotus Sutra.
- Śatasāhasrikā-pañcaviṃśatisāhasrikāṣṭādaśasāhasrikā-prajñāpāramitā-bṛhaṭṭīkā, often attributed to Vasubandhu (4th century).
- The Dazhidulun (大智度論, T no. 1509), the large commentary on the Pañcaviṃśatisāhasrikā Prajñāpāramitā translated by the Kuchan monk Kumārajīva (344–413 CE).
- Two commentaries on the Daśabhūmika sutra, the Daśabhūmikavibhāṣā attributed to Nagarjuna and the Dasabhūmikabhāsya of Vasubandhu.
- Two sutra commentaries by Sthiramati, Commentary on the Kāśyapa Chapter (*Kāśyapaparivartaṭīkā), and Commentary on the Exposition of Akṣayamati (*Akṣayamatinirdeśaṭīkā).
- Dignāga's Samantabhadracaryāpraṇidhānārtha-saṃgraha (A Summary for the Purpose of The Prayer for Completely Good Conduct, Tibetan translation at Toh 4012) a commentary on the last section of the Gaṇḍavyūha Sutra, the Samantabhadracaryāpraṇidhāna (which also circulated as an independent sutra).
- Zhu Weimojie jing (注維摩詰經), collected commentaries to the Vimalakirti sutra which are attributed to Kumārajīva and his translation team.
- Three Indian commentaries to the Śālistamba sutra, the Śālistambakakārikā, the Śālistambakamahāyanasūtraṭīkā, and the Śālistamba[ka]ṭīkā (Kamalashila).
- The commentaries on the Abhisamayālaṅkāra by Arya Vimuktisena and by Haribhadra (late 8th century) are simultaneously also commentaries on the Prajñāpāramitā sutras.
- The Da Ban Niepan Jing Ji Jie (大般涅槃經集解), the earliest available commentary on the Mahāparinirvāṇa Sūtra, attributed to Bao Liang and other Chinese scholars of the Liang dynasty.
- There are two commentaries on Saṃdhinirmocanasutra attributed to Asaṅga, the Compendium of Ascertainments (Viniscaya-samgrahani) and the Āryasaṃdhinirmocana-bhasya. Their attribution to Asanga is questioned by modern scholars.
- Āryasaṃdhinirmocana-sutre-arya-maitreya-kevala-parivarta-bhasya, Jñānagarbha's (8th-century) commentary to the eighth chapter of the Saṃdhinirmocanasutra.
- The Kīrtimala (Tibetan: grags pa'i phreng ba), a commentary the Samādhirāja Sūtra by Mañjuśrīkīrti, survives in Tibetan translation.
- Ratnākaraśānti's (late-10th century to mid-11th century) Prajñāpāramitopadeśa.
- Two Indian commentaries on the Laṅkāvatāra Sūtra by Jñānaśrībhadra (11th century) and Jñānavajra (12th century) survive in Tibetan translation.
- Commentaries by the Sogdian Sanskrit scholar and translator Fazang, including a commentary to the Ghanavyūha sūtra titled Dasheng miyan jing shu (大乘密嚴經疏, no. X368), a commentary to the Ghanavyūha sūtra, a Commentary on the Brahmajala sutra (Fanwang jing pusa jieben shu, Taisho 40, no. 1813) and a Commentary to the Lankavatara sutra.
- Zhiyi's commentaries to the Lotus Sutra: Words and Phrases of the Lotus Sutra (法華文句, Fahua Wenju), and Profound Meaning of the Lotus Sutra (法華玄義, Fahua Xuanyi)

== Mahāyāna Sūtra Collections ==
Some Buddhist Schools in India had collections of Mahāyāna Sūtras which were part of their scriptural canon, sometimes in their own textual collection referred to as Bodhisattva Piṭaka. Jan Nattier notes that the Ugraparipṛcchā Sūtra mentions a Bodhisattva Piṭaka (as part of a four part canon that also includes the Sutra Piṭaka, the Vinaya Piṭaka, and the Abhidharma Piṭaka). According to Nattier, schools which maintained a Bodhisattva Piṭaka include the Dharmaguptaka and perhaps the Bahuśrutīya (or whoever authored the Tattvasiddhi-Śāstra). Some sutras translated by Lokaksema (c. 147-189 CE) also mention a "Bodhisattva Piṭaka".

In the 4th century Mahāyāna abhidharma work Abhidharmasamuccaya, Asaṅga refers to the collection which contains the āgamas as the Śrāvakapiṭaka, and associates it with the śrāvakas and pratyekabuddhas. Asaṅga classifies the Mahāyāna Sūtras as belonging to the Bodhisattvapiṭaka, which is designated as the collection of teachings for bodhisattvas.

The Mahāyāna Sūtras survive predominantly in "Buddhist Chinese" (fójiào hànyǔ 佛教漢語, a variety of written ancient Chinese) and Classical Tibetan translations. The source texts were probably in Buddhist Hybrid Sanskrit or various Prakrit languages such as Gandhari. The main collections are found in the Tibetan Kangyur and the Chinese Tripiṭaka. There are also numerous Sanskrit manuscripts of individual texts from various finds like Dunhuang, and Sanskrit collections from Nepal. Many parallel translations of certain Sūtras exist. A handful of them, such as the Prajñāpāramitā sutras like the Heart Sutra and the Diamond Sutra, are considered fundamental by most modern Mahāyāna traditions.

=== The earliest group of Mahāyāna Sūtras translated into Chinese ===
Some scholars have traditionally considered the earliest Mahāyāna Sūtras to include the very first versions of the Prajñāpāramitā series, along with texts concerning Akshobhya, which were probably composed in the 1st century BCE in the south of India. According to A.K. Warder, some scholars think that the earliest Mahāyāna Sūtras were mainly composed in the south of India, and later the activity of writing additional scriptures was continued in the north.

Some of the earliest Mahāyāna Sūtras were translated by the Kushan monk Lokakṣema, who came to China from the kingdom of Gandhāra. His first translations to Chinese were made in the Eastern Han capital of Luoyang between 178 and 189 CE. The editors of the Taishō Tripiṭaka attribute twelve texts to Lokakṣema. These attributions have been studied in detail by Erik Zürcher, Paul Harrison and Jan Nattier, and some have been called into question. Zürcher considers it reasonably certain that Lokakṣema translated the following:

- T224. Aṣṭasāhasrikā Prajñāpāramitā Sūtra ("The Perfection of Wisdom in Eight Thousand Lines"; 道行般若經)
- T280. The Scripture on the Tusita Heaven (佛說兜沙經.), part of the proto-Avatamsaka Sutra
- T313. Akṣobhya-vyūha (阿閦佛國經)
- T350. Kaśyapa-parivarta ("The Kāśyapa Chapter"; 說遺日摩尼寶經)
- T418. Pratyutpanna Samādhi Sūtra (般舟三昧經)
- T458. Mañjuśrī's Inquiry Concerning the Bodhisattva Career (文殊師利問菩薩署經)
- T626. Ajātaśatru Kaukṛtya Vinodana Sūtra (阿闍世王經)
- T807. The Hundred Jewels of the Inner Treasury (佛說內藏百寶經)

Harrison is doubtful about T626, and considers that T418 is the product of revision and does not date from Lokakṣema's time. Conversely, Harrison considers that T624 Druma-kinnara-rāja-paripṛcchā-sūtra (伅真陀羅所問如來三昧經) ought to be considered genuine.

=== Kumārajīva translations ===
Another set of Mahayana sutras, which gives an indication of which Mahayana sources were widespread in Central Asia, are those translated by the Indian-Kuchan translator Kumārajīva (344–413 CE) and his team (probably from Kuchan target sources) in Chang'an. The main sutras they translated are:

- Vajracchedikā Prajñāpāramitā Sūtra (Diamond Sutra)
- Smaller Sukhāvatī-vyūha (T 366)
- Saddharma Puṇḍarīka Sūtra (Lotus Sutra) (T 263—62)
- Vimalakirti Nirdesa Sutra (T 475)
- Aṣṭasāhasrikā Prajñāpāramitā Sūtra, (T 227, 408 CE)
- Pañcaviṃśatisāhasrikā Prajñāpāramitā Sūtra (T 223, 403-404 CE)
- Śūraṅgama Samādhi Sūtra (T 642)
- Daśabhūmikā Sūtra (T 286) in collaboration with Buddhayaśas.
- Acintyaprabhāsa-nirdeśa-sūtra (T 484)
- Viśeṣacintā-brahma-paripṛcchā (T 585—86)
- Bhadrakalpa (T 425)
- Vasudhara-sūtra (T 481—82)
- Pūrṇa-paripṛcchā ( T 310, 17)
- Ratnajāli-paripṛcchā (T 433)
- Vidhi-hṛdaya-vyūha (T 307)
- Sarva-puṇya-samuccaya-samādhi-sūtra (T 381—82)

=== The Sūtrasamuccaya ===
The Sūtrasamuccaya is a compendium of sūtra quotations which survives in Tibetan and Chinese translation. It is sometimes attributed to Nagarjuna, but is likely to be from a later period (possibly 4th century CE or later). This anthology gives us an idea of some of the important Mahāyāna Sūtras that were being studied and quoted in Indian Mahāyāna Buddhism at this time. The Sūtrasamuccaya quotes from some early Buddhist texts, but mainly focuses on Mahāyāna Sūtras.

The following Mahāyāna Sūtras are quoted in the Sūtrasamuccaya:

- Saddharmapundarika-sutra (Lotus Sutra)
- Nirnaya-raja-sutra
- Bodhisattva-pitaka
- Bhagavajjnana-vaipulya-sutra
- Candra-garbha-parivarta
- Gandavyuha-sutra
- Bhadrakalpika-sutra
- Tathagata-guhya-sutra
- Vimatisamudghata-sutra
- Sraddha-bala-dhana-sutra
- Sagara-naga-raja-pariprccha
- Tathagataguna-jñanacintyavis-ayavatara-nirdesa-sutra
- Astasahasrika Prajñaparamita
- Astadasasahasrika Prajñaparamita
- Pancavimsatisahasrika Prajñaparamita
- Simhasutejo'vadana
- Prasenajit-pariprccha
- Prasanta-viniscaya-pratiharya-sutra
- Ajatasatru-parivarta
- Ratnarasi-sutra
- Kasyapaparivarta
- Pitaputrasamagamana-sutra
- Dharmasamgiti-sutra
- Aksayamati-nirdesa-sutra
- Upayakausalya-sutra
- Viradattagrhapati-pariprcchda
- Ratnamegha-sutra
- Dharani-svararaja-pariprccha
- Maitreya-simhanada-sutra
- Mañjusri-vikridita-sutra
- Candrapradipa (=Samadhiraja, Candraprabhaparivarta) sutra
- Niyataniyatavataramudrasutra
- Mañjusri-vikurvana-parivarta
- Sagaramati-pariprccha-sutra
- Ugra-pariprccha-sutra
- Pravrajyantaraya-sutra
- Udayanavatsaraja-pariprccha
- Saddharma-smrtyupasthana-sutra
- Vimalakirti-nirdesa
- Satyaka-parivarta
- Vicikitsasudhvamsa-sutra (possibly identical to Vimatisamudghata-sutra)
- Suryagarbha-parivarta
- Akasagarbha-parivarta
- Ksitigarbha-sutra
- Adhyasayasamcodana-sutra
- Brahma-pariprccha
- Puspakuta-sutra
- Mahakaruna-(pundarika)-sutra
- Tathagata-bimba-parivarta
- Anupurva-samudgata-sutra
- Tathagatotpattisambhava-sutra
- Lokottara-parivarta
- Lankavatara-sutra
- Mahasamnipata-parivarta
- Avaivartacakra-sutra
- Srimalasimhanada-sutra
- Bhadramayakara-sutra
- Buddhavatamsaka-sutra
- Brahma-visesacinti-pariprccha
- Saptasatika Prajñaparamita
- Ratnasamnicaya-nirdesa-sutra
- Trisatika Prajñaparamita
- Ratnadattamanava-sutra
- Tathagata-kosa-sutra
- Maradamana-parivarta
- Dasabhumika-sutra

=== Madhyamaka school ===
According to David Seyfort Ruegg, the main sutra sources of the madhyamaka tradition are the Prajñāpāramitā, Ratnakūṭa and Avataṃsaka sutras. Other sutras which were widely cited by Indian madhamika philosophers are: Vimalakīrtinirdeṣa, the Śuraṃgamasamādhi, the Saddharmapuṇḍarīka, the Daśabhūmika, the Akṣayamatinirdeśa, the Tathāgataguhyaka, and the Kāśyapaparivarta.

Ruegg also notes that the later madhyamaka Candrakīrti (c. 600 – c. 650) cites the Prajñāpāramitā sutras as well as:

the Akṣayamatinirdeśa, Anavataptahradāpasaṃkramaṇa, Upāliparipṛcchā, Kāśyapaparivarta, Gaganagañja, Tathāgataguhya, Daśabhūmika, Dṛḍhādhyāśaya, Dhāraṇīśvararāja, Pitāputrasamāgama, Mañjuśrīparipṛcchā, Ratnakūṭa, Ratnacūḍaparipṛcchā, Ratnamegha, Ratnākara, Laṅkāvatāra, Lalitavistara, Vimalakirtinirdesa, Śālistamba, Satyadvayāvatāra, Saddharmapuṇḍarīka, Samādhirāja (Candrapradīpa), and Hastikakṣya.

The Compendium of Training (Śikṣāsamuccaya) by the eighth-century madhyamaka scholar Śāntideva, cites a total of ninety-seven Mahāyāna sūtras, some of which are now lost. According to Donald Lopez:

Śāntideva cites three passages from the Lotus Sūtra, compared, for example, with two from the Aṣṭasāhasrikāprajñāpāramitā and two from the Laṅkāvatārasūtra. Among the most cited sūtras are the Akṣayamatinirdeśa (eighteen citations), the Ugraparipṛcchā (twenty citations), the Dharmasaṃgīti (eighteen citations), and the Ratnamegha (twenty-four citations).

=== In the Chinese canon ===
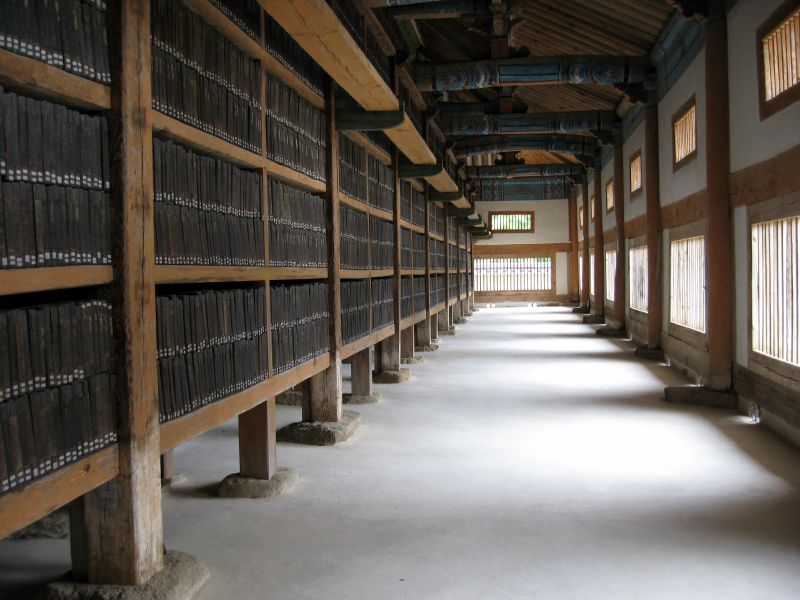
The Tripiṭaka Koreana, an early edition of the Chinese Buddhist canon

Though there are various editions of the Chinese Buddhist canon (大藏經; pinyin: Dàzàngjīng), one of the most widespread modern editions is the Japanese Taisho Tripitaka, redacted during the 1920s. It consists of eighty-five volumes.

The Mahāyāna Sūtras are contained in various sections of the canon:

- Prajñapāramitā Section
- Saddharma Puṇḍarīka Section
- Avataṃsaka Section
- Ratnakūṭa Section
- Mahāparinirvāṇa Section
- Mahāsannipāta Section
- Sutra Collection Section

=== In the Tibetan Canon ===
In the Tibetan Buddhist Canon, Mahāyāna Sūtra translations are found in the Kangyur (Wylie: bka'-'gyur). They are traditionally divided into four divisions:

- Prajñāpāramitā (sher phyin), 23 Sūtras.
- Buddhāvataṃsaka (phal chen), a single long text which is actually a composite work.
- Ratnakūta (dkon brtsegs), 49 Sūtras.
- General Sūtra collection (mdo sde), 266 sūtras, varied in length, subject, interlocutors and origins. Most are Mahāyāna works, but a few are non-Mahāyāna texts.

=== Newar Buddhism ===
Newar Buddhism has a group of nine Sanskrit Mahayana sutras that are considered the key texts of the tradition. They are:

1. Aṣṭasāhasrikā Prajñāpāramitā Sūtra
2. Saddharma Puṇḍarīka Sūtra
3. Suvarṇaprabhāsa Sūtra
4. Samādhirāja Sūtra
5. Gandavyūha Sūtra
6. Laṅkāvatāra Sūtra
7. Daśabhūmika Sūtra
8. Lalitavistara Sūtra
9. Tathāgataguhya Sūtra (actually replaced by the Guhyasamaja since the tradition lost the Tathāgataguhya)

== See also ==
- Buddhist texts
- Sutra
- Buddhist Tantras
- Tripitaka
- List of suttas
- Pali Canon
- Sanskrit Buddhist literature

== Notes ==
=== Bibliography ===
- Dutt, Nalinaksha (1978). Buddhist Sects in India, Motilal Banararsidass, Delhi, 2nd Edition
- Hirakawa, Akira (1990), Groner, Paul (ed.), A History of Indian Buddhism, Honolulu: University of Hawaii Press, hdl:10125/23030, ISBN 0-8248-1203-4
- Kanno, Hiroshi (2003). Chinese Sutra Commentaries from the Early Period, Annual Report of The International Research Institute for Advanced Buddhology at Soka University, IRIAB, vol VI, 301-320
- Macmillan Encyclopedia of Buddhism, Macmillan, 2004.
- McMahan, David (1998). "Orality, writing and authority in South Asian Buddhism: visionary literature and the struggle for legitimacy in the Mahayana". History of Religions. 37 (3): 249–274. doi:10.1086/463504. S2CID 170355105.
- Nakamura, Hajime (1980). Indian Buddhism: A Survey with Bibliographical Notes. 1st edition: Japan, 1980. 1st Indian Edition: Delhi, 1987. ISBN 81-208-0272-1
- Nattier, Jan (January 2003). A Few Good Men: The Bodhisattva Path According to the Inquiry of Ugra (Ugraparipṛcchā) : a Study and Translation. University of Hawaii Press. ISBN 978-0-8248-2607-9.
- Pettit, John W. (8 February 2013). Mipham's Beacon of Certainty: Illuminating the View of Dzogchen, the Great Perfection. Wisdom Publications. ISBN 978-0-86171-719-4.
- Skilton, Andrew T (1999). "Dating the Samādhirāja Sūtra". Journal of Indian Philosophy. 27 (6): 635. doi:10.1023/A:1004633623956. S2CID 169281191.
- Thích, Nhất Hạnh (1987). The Sutra on the Eight Realizations of the Great Beings. Parallax Press. ISBN 978-0-938077-07-7.
- Pfand, Peter (1986). Māhāyana Texts Translated into Western Languages – A Bibliographical Guide. E.J. Brill, Köln, ISBN 3-923956-13-4
- Reeves, Gene (2002). A Buddhist kaleidoscope: essays on the lotus sutra. Kosei Pub. Co. ISBN 978-4-333-01918-2.
- Skilton, Andrew (1997). A Concise History of Buddhism. Windhorse. ISBN 978-0-904766-92-9.
- Walser, Joseph. Genealogies of Mahāyāna Buddhism: Emptiness, Power and the question of Origin. Routledge.
- Walser, Joseph (2012), Nagarjuna in Context Mahayana Buddhism and Early Indian Culture. Columbia University Press.
- Warder, A. K. (1999). Indian Buddhism. Motilal Banarsidass, Delhi. 3rd revised edition
- Williams, Paul (2008). Mahayana Buddhism: The Doctrinal Foundations. Taylor & Francis
