= Ugraparipṛcchā Sūtra =

Early Indian Buddhist text

The Ugraparipṛcchā Sūtra (The inquiry of Ugra) is an early Indian sutra which is particularly important for understanding the beginnings of Mahāyāna Buddhism. It contains positive references to both the path of the bodhisattva and the path of the arhat, the latter of which was denigrated as a lesser spiritual path in later Mahāyāna sutras. It also emphasises solitary spiritual practices instead of community-based ones, much like the very early Rhinoceros Sutra.

== History of the sutra ==
While no version in an Indo-Aryan language survives, extant versions of the Ugraparipṛcchā Sūtra include three Chinese translations (Taishō Tripiṭaka 322, 12.15a-23a; T 323 12.23a-30c; T 310[10], 11.472b-480b), a Tibetan translation, and a Mongolian translation based on the Tibetan version.

The Ugraparipṛcchā Sūtra was one of the first Buddhist texts to be brought to China and it was apparently very popular as it was translated into Chinese six times between the second and fifth centuries, appearing first as Dharma Mirror Sutra (Chinese: 法鏡經; pinyin: Fǎjìng jīng) translated by An Xuan and Yan Fotiao during the Later Han and then by Dharmarakṣa during the Jin Dynasty. In the Chinese canon it is part of the Ratnakuta collection. It was also widely known in India, being one of the most quoted texts in both the Daśabhūmikā Vibhāṣā (Commentary on the Ten Stages Sutra attributed to Nāgārjuna) and Śāntideva's Śikṣāsamuccaya (8th century).

Jan Nattier has suggested that it is likely the text circulated in Dharmaguptaka circles early in its history.

== Content of the sutra ==
The central themes of the Ugraparipṛcchā Sūtra are the practices of the householder (gṛhin) and those of the bhikṣu (pravrajita) and bhikṣuṇī (pravrajitā), stressing the importance and superiority of the latter group. The sutra promotes the bodhisattva ideal as a difficult, strictly monastic path, taking thousands of lifetimes to complete and suited only for the few. It also does not mention any other central Mahayana doctrines or place its teachings in opposition to what would later be classified as "Śrāvakayāna" teachings. Because of this, scholars such as Jan Nattier believe it dates to an early period in the development of Mahāyãna Buddhism.

The position of householder is seen as highly disadvantageous to religious practice in comparison to the life of a pravrajita and householders are urged to ordain as soon as they are able. In the Ugraparipṛcchā Sūtra, the practice of living as a forest (āraṇyaka) bodhisattva is seen as preferable to being a village monk:

The Ugraparipṛcchā Sūtra, for example, tells us that the life of forest renunciation represents the normative Buddhist way of life for bodhisattvas: "The bodhisattva who has left the world must reflect that dwelling in the forest [araṇyavāsa] was ordained by the Buddha, and therefore he must live in the forest; for thus there is fulfillment of the dharma."

Even when the bodhisattva enters the towns and cities to preach he must "keep a cave-and-forest mind, as when he dwells in his hermitage."

== Contents ==
Practices of the Lay Bodhisattva

1. Opening Salutation
2. The Setting
3. Ugra's Inquiry
4. Going for Refuge
5. The Refuges, Repeated
6. Good Deeds
7. The Bodhisattva's Perspective
8. The Eleven Precepts
9. The Bodhisattva in Society
10. The Faults of the Household Life
11. The Benefits of Giving
12. Thoughts When Encountering Beggars
13. Detachment from People and Things
14. Cultivating Aversion for One's Wife
15. Cultivating Detachment from One's Son
16. How to Interact with Beggars
17. The Triskandhaka Ritual
18. When Monks Violate the Precepts
19. When Visiting a Monastery
20. Contrasts between Household and Renunciant Life
21. When Visiting a Monastery, Cont'd
22. The Ordination of Ugra and His Friends (version 1)

Practices of the Monastic Bodhisattva

1. The Renunciant Bodhisattva's Practices
2. The Four Noble Traditions
3. The Noble Traditions and Other Ascetic Practices
4. The Virtues of Wilderness-Dwelling
5. Interacting with Other Monks and Teachers
6. The Pure Morality of the Renunciant Bodhisattva
7. The Pure Meditation of the Renunciant Bodhisattva
8. The Pure Insight of the Renunciant Bodhisattva
9. The Ordination of Ugra and His Friends (version 2)
10. How the Householder Can Live as a Renunciant
11. Dialogue with Ananda
12. The Title of the Text
13. The Final Reaction of the Audience

== See also ==
- Mahāyāna sutras
