= Ajitasena Sutra =

The Ajitasena-vyakarana-nirdesa sutra ("Explanation of prophecy [for king] Ajitasena") is a 'proto-Mahayana' sutra, found near Gilgit in 1931. The manuscript itself dates to about the sixth or seventh centuries CE.

== Outline ==
This sutra shows elements of Mahayana sutras such as the belief that an Arahant can see all the Buddha fields and a practice which allows one to see with the eyes of the Buddha and receive teachings from him. Yet there is no clear differentiation made between Mahayana and Sravaka teachings, which are seen as inferior in later Mahayana texts. The word Mahayana does not appear in it. Therefore this sutra is seen as dating from a period before the Buddhists that held "Mahayanist" views began to see themselves as distinct from mainstream Buddhism.

One of the central themes of the sutra is the importance of practicing Dāna (giving to the community of monks) by the laity. In the sutra a beggar woman attempts suicide because she has nothing to give and is presented with gifts from a god which she gives to the monks; the sutra predicts that she will attain Buddhahood because of her almsgiving and gain a good rebirth. This story presents the idea that all people have access to Buddhahood.

One of the main characters in the sutra is Nandimitra, who is sent by the Buddha as an adviser to king Ajitasena (whose son is the reborn woman above) to teach the king about the importance of almsgiving. The prince decides to ordain as a monk and becomes an Arhat. As an enlightened Arhat he is able to see the Buddha fields (Skt. buddha-kṣetra) where Buddhas live and teach. According to Paul Williams, the development of early Mahayana may have been influenced by the desire to access Buddha fields in visions and dreams.

The sutra also teaches that recitation of the name of the Buddha can save one from suffering and hell. The sutra ends in a fashion similar to later Mahayana sutras by stating that those who teach the sutra will attain good rebirths and Buddhahood and those who listen to even one verse it will become Bodhisattvas, while those who condemn the sutra will go to hell. Hence this sutra shows only an opposition to those who deny the teachings presented in the sutra, not to mainstream practitioners working towards Arhatship.

== See also ==
- Mahayana sutras
