= Tathāgataguhya Sūtra =

Popular Sutra in Mahāyāna Buddhism

Statue of Vajrapani, Kashmir, 8th century

The Tathāgataguhya Sūtra (Secrets of the Tathāgata) or Tathāgatācintyaguhyanirdeśasūtra (The Sūtra that Teaches the Inconceivable Mystery of the Tathāgata) is an important Mahayana Buddhist sutra, which is also part of the Mahāratnakūṭa compilation.

Péter-Dániel Szántó lists some alternative names for this sutra: Āryatathāgataguhyasūtra, Guhyakādhipatinirdeśa, *Vajrapāṇiparivarta, *Tathāgataguhyanirdeśaparivarta, *Acintyabuddhadharmanirdeśa, and *Apramāṇapuṇyodaya. This Mahāyāna sutra is not to be confused with the Guhyasamāja-tantra, which also goes by the name Tathāgataguhyaka.

== Overview ==
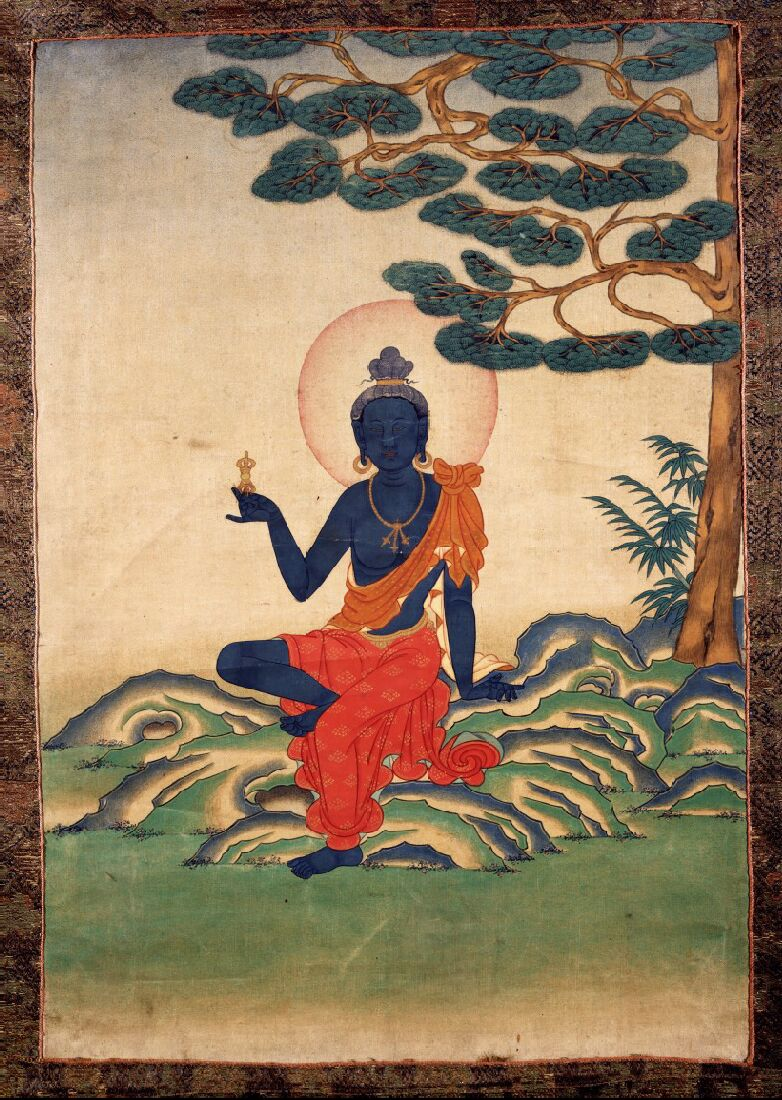
Tibetan painting of Vajrapani, 19th-century

=== Content ===
The sutra centers around a dialogue between the Buddha and the bodhisattva Vajrapāṇi. It discusses the three secrets of a Buddha's body, speech and mind, the Mahayana view of non-duality, the nature of the mind and how it relates to the Buddha.

According to Tetsutaka Hamano's study, the sutra can be divided into three sections:

1. Chapters 1 to 10 focus on "the three secrets of the bodhisattvas and the three secrets of the Tathāgata."
2. Chapters 11 to 14 focus on "the life of the Buddha from the perspective of Vajrapāṇi."
3. Chapters 15 to 25, "on bodhisattva conduct and the deeds of Vajrapāṇi."

==== The nature of Buddhahood ====
The main teaching of the Tathāgataguhya is the Buddhas and bodhisattvas manifest in infinite ways (through their magical body, speech and mind). This Buddha activity is completely automatic, unintentional and non-conceptual. These manifestations also arise due to the karma and mental inclinations of sentient beings and they match the needs of sentient beings.

According to a translator of the sutra, Shaku Shingan, the Tathāgataguhya sees the nature of the Buddha as being like space (Skt. ākāsa) and so it is all-pervasive and spans the cosmos. Thus the Buddha is seen as being within all beings. This means that any perception of the Buddha is just a reflection of our own minds and any knowledge of the Dharma that one can attain is only due to the Buddha wisdom which dwells in the bodies of all sentient beings. The sutra states:

the superior wisdom possessed by all Tathāgatas dwells in the bodies of all sentient beings ... It would not be possible otherwise for all sentient beings abiding anywhere to accord with the secrets that the Tathāgata teaches if they did not contain the Tathāgata’s power of assistance and accord with the Tathāgata’s Dharma nature. Furthermore, if one hears, if one speaks, and if one has an understanding about the profound Dharma of the secrets taught by the Tathāgata, then that is all by virtue of the power of the Tathāgata’s assistance.

Thus, according to this sutra, sentient beings do not gain knowledge of the Dharma due to their own efforts, but through the power of the Buddha. The bodhisattva path therefore is cultivated by giving rise to bodhicitta and by understanding the true nature of a Buddha's Dharma body (which is empty, all pervasive and unlimited). This activates the entirety of the purity of the Buddha's body, speech and mind that is already within all beings and this gives rise to the Buddha. Therefore, the result (Buddhahood) is not attained by creating it through causes, rather the result is merely accessed since it is already present in the aspirant. This means that the bodhisattva who has given rise to bodhicitta practices the path of the paramitas with the Buddha's power aiding them.

The Tathāgataguhya also equates the Buddha's body, which is said to span all three times (past, present, future), with suchness. The Buddha's bodily appearance to sentient beings (as the figure of Śākyamuni Buddha) is just one manifestation of this cosmic body or Dharma body (Dharmakāya) for the good of sentient beings. It always appears in accord with their needs and nature. The sutra compares this automatic Buddha activity to a mirror, which reflects whatever is in front of it effortlessly and without intending to.

Regarding the Buddha's speech, the sutra states the Buddha never really spoke a word:

from the day and night that he attained the fruit of anuttara-samyak-saṃbodhi to the day and night that he will enter Mahāparinirvāṇa, within that period, the Tathāgata has never once uttered a single word, he has not expressed any meaning. Why? Because the Buddha Tathāgata permanently abides in samāhita [i.e., meditative equipoise].

While the Buddha is said not to actually say anything, through the power of the Buddha's secret of speech, living beings hear various teachings in words that conform to their linguistic and regional needs. This is compared to a magical instrument without a player.

The secret of the Buddha's mind is the fact that it is always in a transcendent state of samādhi, it does not think, intend or fluctuate. However, it can still manifest in endless ways to help sentient beings according to their needs.

==== Other teachings ====
The later versions of this sutra also contain various vidyās, which in this case refers to mantras. The sutra also teaches a dhāraṇī called “Dhāraṇī Door of the Entry into the Characteristics of Dharmas,” which is just the Sanskrit letter A. This letter precedes all letters in the Sanskrit syllabary and is also a negating prefix, thus it symbolizes non-duality, ineffability and emptiness. The letter is important in other Mahāyāna texts, being the main teaching of the Perfection of Wisdom in One Letter (Ekākṣarī-prajñāpāramitā).

=== Influence ===
The Tathāgataguhya is widely cited by Indian Buddhist authors, especially by Madhyamaka school authors like Candrakīrti, Shantideva and Kamalaśīla. According to Etienne Lamotte, the Tathāgataguhya is also cited by the Vimalakirti Sutra twice. The Tathāgataguhyaka sutra is also referenced in the Laṅkāvatārasūtra. The sutra is also cited three times in the Dà zhìdù lùn translated by Kumārajīva (4th century). According to Tetsutaka Hamano, this sutra was also an important source for the ideas of the Buddha found in the Mahāyānasūtrālaṅkāra of Sthiramati.

Hamano, also considers the Tathāgataguhya to be related or similar to the tathāgatagarbha sūtras, since its doctrine about the omnipresence of the Buddha and the presence of the Buddha's knowledge within sentient beings seems to prefigure the Buddha-nature ideas found in tathāgatagarbha texts (which are not mentioned in the Tathāgataguhya), including the Ratnagotravibhāga.

The Tathāgataguhya was also influential on Nepalese Newar Buddhism, where it was originally part of the Navagrantha or Navasūtra, a core set of nine Mahāyāna sutras in this tradition.

=== Translations ===
While the Sanskrit text of the Tathāgataguhya exists only in fragmentary form, there is a full Tibetan translation (by Jinamitra, Dānaśila, Munivarman, and Yeshe de) and two Chinese translations, one (Taisho 310, 大寶積經) by Dharmarakṣa of Dunhuang (230–316 CE) and one (Taisho 312, 如來不思議秘密大乘經) by another Dharmarakṣa who was active during the later Song dynasty who died in 1058. According to Shaku Shingan, the earlier Chinese translation contains various terms that are influenced by Daoist terminology.

According to Japanese scholar Hiromitsu Ikuma, the surviving Sanskrit manuscript has numerous issues and is a later version of the text, similar to the Song dynasty version (and the Tibetan).

The sutra has been little studied by Western scholars, and most of the work done by modern scholars on it is in Japanese. An English translation from the Chinese (Taisho number 312) has been published by Shaku Shingan.
