= Bequeathed Teachings Sutra =

Sutra in Mahāyāna Buddhism

The Bequeathed Teachings Sutra, or the Sutra on the Buddha's Bequeathed Teaching and Bequeathed Sutra (Ch. 佛垂般涅槃略說敎誡經, T.389) is a brief Mahayana sutra containing instructions left by the Gautama Buddha before His said final nirvana. It is reportedly translated by Kumārajīva into Chinese around 400 C.E.

== Overview ==
The sutra presents itself as the final teachings of Gautama Buddha, delivered to the disciples assembled around his resting place between two sal trees. In this last sermon, the Buddha urged his disciples to strive for enlightenment through thorough monastic discipline. According to Cleary, "the Buddha teaches here from the perspective of cause and effect: pure discipline is a basic necessity because it allows good qualities to develop." The Buddha warns against seeking material wealth, influence, and discourages monks from earning a living through fortune telling or the performance of healing. The Buddha concludes by declaring the sutra his last teaching.

The sutra "is used as a liturgical text in both Taiwan and Japan, where it seems to be particularly associated with the Soto Zen sect." It was frequently cited or the subject of commentary during the Tang, Song, and Ming dynasties. It was a perennial source of reference and instruction for Chinese Chan communities.

== See also ==
- Buddhist apocrypha – Texts outside historical Buddhist canon
- Buddhist texts – Historic literature and religious texts of Buddhism
- Chinese Buddhist canon – Canon of Chinese Buddhism, and much of the Sinosphere
