= Jan Nattier =

American scholar of Buddhist studies

Jan Nattier is an American scholar of Mahāyāna Buddhism.

== Early life and education ==
Janice J. Nattier earned her PhD in Inner Asian and Altaic Studies from Harvard University (1988), and subsequently taught at the University of Hawaii (1988–1990), Stanford University (1990–1992), and Indiana University (1992–2005). She then worked as a research professor at the International Research Institute for Advanced Buddhology, Soka University (2006–2010) before retiring from her position there and beginning a series of visiting professorships at various universities in the U.S.

== Career ==
Nattier is one of a group of scholars who have substantially revised views of the early development of Mahāyana Buddhism in the last 20 years. They have in common their attention to and re-evaluation of early Chinese translations of texts.

Her first notable contribution was a book based on her PhD thesis which looked at the Chinese Doctrine of the Three Ages with a focus on the third i.e. Mofa (Chinese: 末法; pinyin: Mò Fǎ) or Age of Dharma Decline. She showed that the latter was a Chinese development with no India parallel. The translation and study of the Ugraparipṛcca published as A Few Good Men: The Bodhisattva Path according to The Inquiry of Ugra (Ugraparipṛcchā) in 2003 also contained an extended essay on working with ancient Buddhist texts, particularly in Chinese.

Nattier's notable articles include a study of the Akṣobhyavūhya Pure Land texts, which asserts the early importance of this strand of Mahāyāna ideology; an evaluation of early Chinese Translations of Buddhist texts and the issue of attribution (which summarises several earlier articles on the subject); and a detailed re-examination of the origins of the Heart Sutra (1992), which demonstrates that the text was likely compiled in China.

== Private life ==
Nattier was married to John R. McRae (1947–2011), a professor and researcher who specialized in the study of Chinese Chan Buddhism and was the author of The Northern School and the Formation of Early Chan Buddhism (University of Hawai`i Press, 1986) and Seeing through Zen: Encounter, Transformation, and Genealogy in Chinese Chan Buddhism (University of California Press, 2003).

== Select bibliography ==
Works in addition to those mentioned below in the "Sources" section.

- Nattier, Jan (1990), Once Upon a Future Time: Studies in a Buddhist Prophecy of Decline, Asian Humanities Press, ISBN 978-0895819260
- Nattier, Jan (2006), A Greater Awakening, Tricycle: The Buddhist Review
- Nattier, Jan (2008), "A Guide to the Earliest Chinese Buddhist Translations: Texts from the Eastern Han and Three Kingdoms Periods" (PDF), vol. X, Bibliotheca Philologica et Philosophica, IRIAB, pp. 73–88, ISBN 978-4-904234-00-6, archived from the original (PDF) on 2013-10-23
- Nattier, Jan (2014), Now You Hear It, Now You Don't: The Phrase 'Thus Have I Heard' in Early Chinese Buddhist Translations (Chapter 3, in Buddhism Across Asia: Networks of Material, Intellectual and Cultural Exchange. Edited by Tansen Sen. Volume 1), ISEAS–Yusof Ishak Institute, Singapore, pp. 39–64, ISBN 9789814519328

== Sources ==
- Drewes, David (2010), "Early Indian Mahāyāna Buddhism I: Recent Scholarship", Religion Compass, 4 (2): 55–65, doi:10.1111/j.1749-8171.2009.00195.x, JSTOR j.1749-8171.2009.00195.x
- Lion's Roar Staff (October 26, 2011), John R. McRae, Buddhist scholar, dies at 64
- Kapstein, Matthew (July 2005), "Jan Nattier, A Few Good Men: The Bodhisattva Path according to the Inquiry of Ugra (Ugraparipṛcchā)", The Journal of Religion, 85 (3): 528–530, doi:10.1086/447737
- Nattier, Jan (1992), "The Heart Sūtra: a Chinese apocryphal text?", Journal of the International Association of Buddhist Studies, 15 (2): 153–223
- Nattier, Jan (2000), "The Realm of Akṣobhya: A Missing Piece in the History of Pure Land Buddhism", Journal of the International Association of Buddhist Studies, 23 (1): 71–102
- Nattier, Jan (2003), A Few Good Men : The Bodhisattva Path According to the Inquiry of Ugra (Ugraparipṛcchā), University of Hawai'i Press, ISBN 978-0824830038
- Nattier, Jan (2006), A Greater Awakening, Tricycle: The Buddhist Review
- Richter, Antje (2017), Professor Emerita Jan Nattier Explores Narratives of Gender and Transformation in Her April 27 Talk, University of Colorado Boulder
