= Ekayāna =

Term in Buddhism and Hinduism

Ekayāna (Sanskrit: एकयान, traditional Chinese: 一乘; pinyin: Yīchéng; Japanese: いちじょう; Korean: 일승) is a Sanskrit word that means "one path" or "one vehicle". It is used in the Upanishads and the Mahāyāna sūtras.

== Upanishads ==
In the Brihadaranyaka Upanishad, "ekayāna" took on special significance as a metaphor for a spiritual journey. The phrase vedānāṃ vāk ekayānam translates approximately to "the one destination of the Vedas is the spirit of the word".

== Mahayana Buddhism ==
Ekayāna sutras of primary influence are the Lotus Sutra, the Śrīmālādevī Siṃhanāda Sūtra, the Ratnagotravibhāga, and the Tathāgatagarbha sūtras, which also include the Tathāgatagarbha Sūtra, the Mahāyāna Mahāparinirvāṇa Sūtra, and the Aṅgulimālīya Sūtra. Sutras with similar teachings include the Laṅkāvatāra Sūtra and the Avatamsaka Sutra. The Lotus Sutra declares that "the three vehicles of the Śrāvaka (disciple), Pratyekabuddha (Solitary Buddha), and Bodhisattva are actually just three expedient devices (upayakausalya) for attracting beings to the one buddha vehicle, via which they all become buddhas."

=== Chinese Buddhism ===
While the "One Vehicle" Buddhism declined in India along with the rest of Buddhism, it became a key aspect of the Chinese acculturation and acceptance of Buddhism. The Chinese assimilation of Buddhism met in the vast diversity of Buddhist texts the problem of sorting through them for the core of Buddhist teaching.

This problem was solved by Chinese Buddhist teachers by taking up one or more of the Ekayana Sutras as central to the understanding of the diversity of Buddhism. The doctrines and practices of Tiantai (Japanese Tendai) and Huayen (Japanese Kegon) Buddhist sects were able to present a synthesis of the diversity of Buddhism that was understandable and palatable by the Chinese worldview.

==== Chan Buddhism ====
Chan Buddhism affected this synthesis in a unique way by focusing on the practice of meditation as taught in the Laṅkāvatāra Sūtra as the core method of personally realizing the Ekayana teachings while at the same time acknowledging the transcendental and devotional aspects represented by the Avatamsaka Sutra and the Lotus Sutra, respectively. The Indian Buddhist monk Bodhidharma (c. 5th to 6th century), who is considered the founder of Chan Buddhism, was said to have brought the "Ekayāna school of Southern India" to China and passed it down along with the Laṅkāvatāra Sūtra to his primary disciple, Dazu Huike (487-593), known as the Second Founding Ancestor of the Chan lineage.^{,}

Guifeng Zongmi (780 - 841) was an accredited master of both the Chan and Huayan lineages. In his treatise, The Original Person Debate (Chinese: 原人論), he explicitly identifies the Ekayāna teachings as the most profound type of spiritual realization and equates it with the direct realization of one's own nature:

Buddha's teaching itself goes from shallow to profound. In outline there are five classes: 1. The teachings of human and heavenly beings. 2. The Small Vehicle's (Hinayana) teaching. 3. The Great Vehicle's (Mahayana) teaching of Dharma characteristics (dharmalaksana). 4. The Great Vehicle's teaching of destroying characteristics. 5. The One Vehicle's (Ekayana) teaching of manifesting Nature."

Thus, according to Zongmi who was a lineage master of both Huayan and Chan, he clearly distinguished the Ekayana from the Mahayana, and the Mahayana teachings of Yogacara (his Mahayana class 3) and Madhyamaka (his Mahayana class 4) were eclipsed by the more profound Ekayana teaching of "manifesting nature."

== See also ==
- Mahāyāna sūtras
- Yana

== Bibliography ==
- Apple, James B. (2015), "The Single Vehicle (ekayāna) in the Avaivartikacakra sūtra and Lotus sūtra" (PDF), Bulletin of the Institute of Oriental Philosophy, 30: 13-43
- Kotatsu, Fujita; Hurvitz, Leon, trans. (1975). "One Vehicle or Three". Journal of Indian Philosophy. 3 (1/2): 79–166. doi:10.1007/bf00157332. JSTOR 23438660. S2CID 170267103.
- Nattier, Jan (2007). One Vehicle in the Chinese Agamas, Annual Report of The International Research Institute for Advanced Buddhology at Soka University 10, 181-200
- Pye, Michael (2003). Skilful Means - A concept in Mahayana Buddhism. Routledge. ISBN 0203503791.
- Teiser, Stephen F.; Stone, Jacqueline Ilyse, eds. (2009). Readings of the Lotus Sutra, New York: Columbia University Press
- Gethin, Rupert M.L. (2001). The Buddhist Path to Awakening, Oxford: Oneworld Publications, pp. 59–66. ISBN 1-85168-285-6
