= Nirvana School =

School of Mahayana Buddhism established and practiced in China

The Nirvāṇa School (Chinese: 涅槃宗; Niepan-zong) was a doctrinal tradition within East Asian Mahāyāna Buddhism that centered on the interpretation and propagation of the Mahāparinirvāṇa-sūtra (Chinese: 大般涅槃經). It is characterized by a positive understanding of Nirvāṇa, and by its assertion that all sentient beings inherently possess Buddha-nature (佛性, fo xing) and so all beings can attain Buddhahood. In this tradition, Nirvāṇa represents the actualization and manifestation of this innate Buddha-nature, which is perpetually present within each being as an eternal and unchanging reality. The Nirvana school also promoted the controversial idea of "the enlightenability of the icchantika" (beings traditionally thought to be devoid of the seed of enlightenment). While the school eventually faded, its central message regarding the universality of Buddha-nature became a credal doctrine for Sinitic Mahayana Buddhism.

== Chinese Nirvana School ==
=== Early period ===
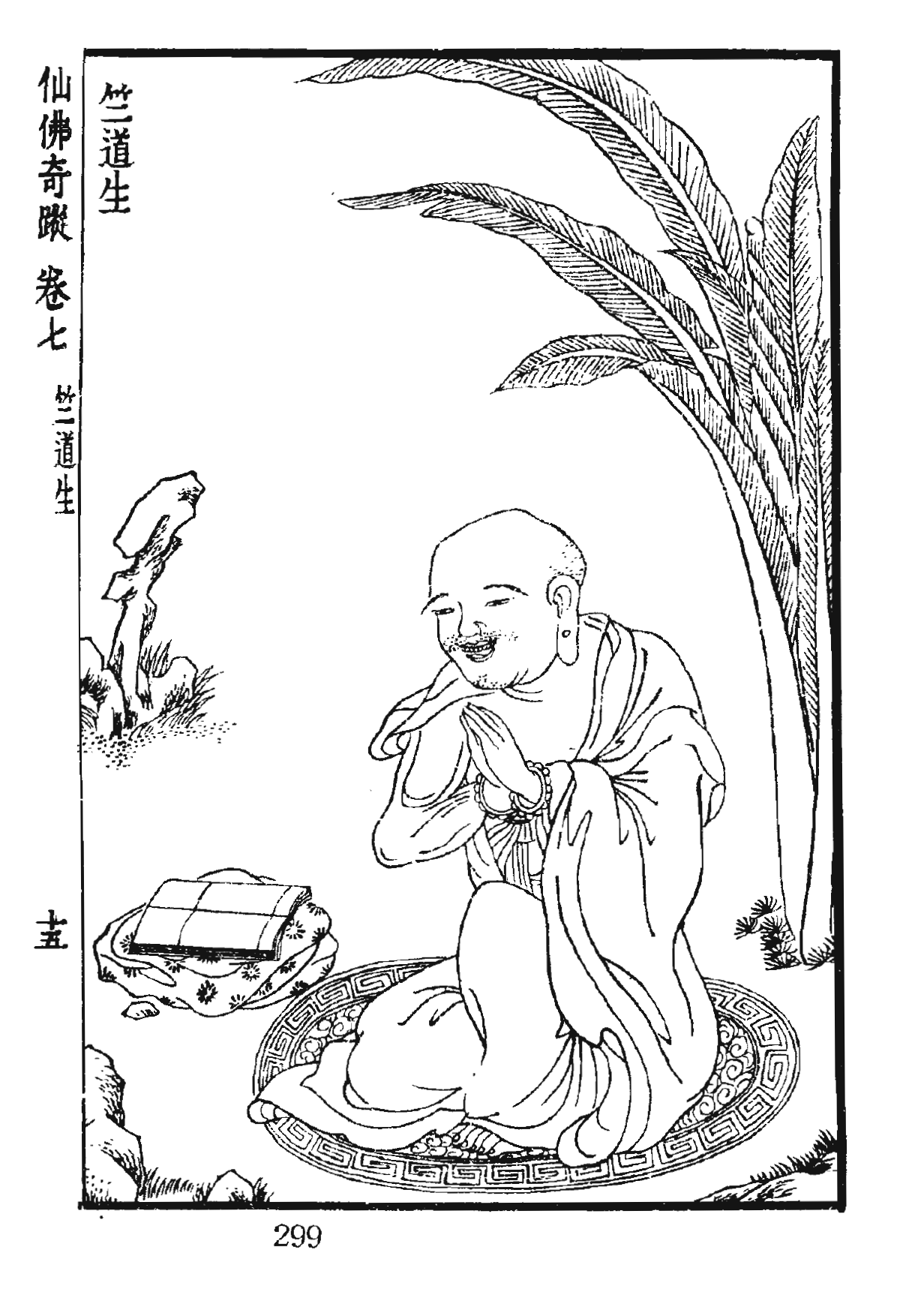
Daosheng

The Nirvāṇa School emerged in China during the early fifth century CE, catalyzed by the translation activities surrounding the Mahāparinirvāṇa-sūtra. An early precursor to the tradition can be traced to the scholar-monk Daosheng (道生, d. 434) of the Later Qin, who studied the six-scroll edition of the Mahāparinirvāṇa-sūtra, translated by Faxian (法顯) in 417–418. Daosheng advanced the controversial doctrine that even icchantikas (beings of incorrigible moral depravity and total lack of faith) could attain Buddhahood. This view laid a doctrinal foundation for the subsequent development of the school. The initial, shorter translation of the Nirvana Sutra by Faxian stated that icchantikas were destitute of Buddha-nature, leading to Daosheng's temporary banishment from the Buddhist community for openly opposing this canonical position (circa 428-429 CE). His vindication came in 430 CE with the arrival of the longer version of the sutra from the north, which readmitted the icchantika into the possibility of enlightenment.

A major turning point occurred with the work of Dharmakṣema (曇無讖, 385–433) of Northern Liang, who between 414 and 421 translated the more expansive forty-scroll version of the Mahāparinirvāṇa-sūtra, known as the Northern Edition (北本涅槃經). This translation quickly became a focal point of exegetical activity and inspired the formation of the Nirvāṇa School as a distinct exegetical tradition.

Daosheng is also well known for his stance on "sudden enlightenment", which he developed based on Sarvastivada Abhidharma thought, Madhyamaka philosophy and the Lotus Sutra. A unique aspect of Daosheng's doctrine of sudden enlightenment was that it was also influenced by Neo-Taoism thought. Daosheng argued that enlightenment, mirroring absolute emptiness, must be total and not gradual or piecemeal. However, unlike Indian Madhyamika or Buddha-nature traditions which were inclined towards gradualism, Daosheng's logic also relies on Neo-Taoist concepts, such as ziran (nature, spontaneity, as-is-ness).

In the southern regions of China, a revised edition of the sūtra was also produced by Huiyan (慧嚴), Huiguan (慧觀), and the literatus Xie Lingyun (謝靈運). They compiled a thirty-six-scroll recension known as the Southern Edition (南本涅槃經), integrating the earlier six-scroll version with the Northern Edition. This Southern Edition became the most widely circulated and studied version in subsequent centuries.

Monks such as Huiguan and Daosheng, who were disciples of the eminent translator Kumārajīva (344–413), regarded the Mahāparinirvāṇa-sūtra as the consummation of the Buddha's teaching. Doctrinal positions derived from the text, such as "the dharmakāya is eternal" (法身常住) and "all sentient beings possess buddha-nature" (一切衆生悉有佛性), played a formative role in the evolution of Chinese Buddhist philosophy.

The Nirvāṇa School also produced significant contributions to doctrinal taxonomy. Huiguan's "Five Periods Teaching of the Nirvāṇa School" (涅槃宗五時教) became a foundational scheme for subsequent systems of doctrinal classification (教判).

=== Later Period ===
The Nirvana School's later development saw a surprising re-alignment with scholarship focusing on the Chengshilun (Tattvasiddhi-Śāstra, "The Treatise that Accomplishes Reality") by Harivarman. This alignment was initially seen as problematic due to the Chengshilun's Hinayanist structure, which theoretically would not support universal Buddhahood.

However, this doctrinal turn had specific reasons. The first was a reaction to critiques from purist Madhyamika scholars like Seng-kao, who initially rejected the Nirvana Sutra due to its reintroduction of an atman-like (self) concept, which they viewed as contrary to the Buddha's denial of a substantial self and Nagarjuna's emptiness philosophy. Meanwhile, the Chinese perceived the Chengshilun as endorsing a "real Principle" (shi-i, or a "Tattva") that went beyond mere destructive dialectics and transcended the emptiness-focused negative philosophy associated with Madhyamaka. This "Real Principle" in the Chengshilun was associated with the third Noble Truth, nirodha (cessation/Nirvana), which Harivarman called the "real truth" or "One Truth". The Chinese Nirvana School further interpreted this to mean that Harivarman endorsed a "permanent Nirvana" and a "substantive wisdom nature," thus going beyond mere emptiness.

Baoliang (寶亮, d. 509), a Nirvana school master during the Liang dynasty, was instrumental in successfully wedding the Nirvana Sutra's doctrines with the Chengshilun. He intricately associated Buddha-nature with the unity of the Two Truths (mundane and highest truth), which he interpreted as the "middle path" and the "One Way," where samsara and nirvana coincide. Baoliang dynamically conceived Buddha-nature through four aspects: basic-cause, conditioned-cause, result, and result-of-result. He located Buddha-nature in the mind, calling it the "mysterious essence of divine illumination" (shen-ming miao-t'i), an innately pure mind.

Baoliang's concept of a "positive middle [way]" in the unity of the Two Truths was significantly indebted to a native Chinese understanding of life (sheng), mind (hsin), and nature (hsing), as well as to the more positive Confucian metaphysics found in the doctrine of the Mean.

Baoliang is also known for compiling many earlier Nirvana Sutra commentaries into a massive commentarial collection named Compendium of Commentaries on the Mahāparinirvāṇa-sūtra (Dabanniepanjing ji jie 大般涅槃經集解, T.1763, c. 509), which is a major source for Chinese interpretations of the Nirvana Sutra.

=== Eclipse and Enduring Legacy ===
The synthesis achieved by the Nirvana and Chengshilun scholarship faced criticism in the Sui dynasty, particularly from the more purist Madhyamika perspective championed by Jizang (549–623) of the San-lun (Three Treatise) school. Jizang argued that the Nirvana School's interpretation of Buddha-nature was too positive and realistic, thereby missing the negative dialectics and emptiness central to true wisdom. He criticized Baoliang's view that Buddha-nature was "in but not of the skandhas" explanation as rationalizing a "Both/And" logic rather than a critical "Neither/Nor" negation of all concepts and possibilities regarding existence. Thus, he deemed their understanding of the Two Truths as dangerously ontological, a position rejected in Madhayama which instead prefers to describe ultimate truth solely via negation.

Jizang therefore employed the Madhyamaka technique of destructive dialectics to dismantle any definition of Buddha-nature, arguing that it is ultimately inconceivable and beyond thought or predication. He asserted that Buddha-nature is not something one "knows", but rather the knowledge that penetrates the emptiness of all things.

Despite Jizang's critique, the mode of thinking found in the Nirvana School persisted, as his stringent dialectics did not fully resonate with the Chinese. Even as the school itself was superseded by movements like the Tiantai school (which incorporated many of its ideas), the universality of Buddha-nature, the core message of the Nirvana School, became a fundamental and accepted doctrine for Chinese Mahayana Buddhism. During the Sui dynasty (隋朝, 581–618), the Tiantai patriarch Zhiyi (智顗, 538–597) articulated the view that the Lotus Sūtra and Mahāparinirvāṇa-sūtra shared the same singular, sublime flavor. This doctrinal integration led to the absorption of Nirvāṇa School ideas into the Tiantai School.

== Development in Korean Buddhism ==
The Nirvāṇa School was also transmitted to the Korean Peninsula. During the Baekje kingdom, under the reign of King Uija (r. 641–660), the monk Bodeok (普德, fl. c. 650) established the Nirvāṇa School in Jeonju. Following the fall of Baekje, the school continued to flourish during the reign of King Muyeol (武烈王, r. 654–661) of the Silla kingdom. In Korea, it was also referred to as the Siheung School (始興宗).

Bodeok originated from Ryonggang-hyeon (龍崗縣) in Goguryeo and was initially affiliated with Banryongsa (盤龍寺). He opposed the growing influence of Taoism at the court of King Bojang (寶藏王) and warned of its detrimental effects on the state. When his counsel was ignored, he relocated to Mount Godal (孤達山) in Wansanju, Baekje. This migration was later commemorated with the phrase "Flying to the Dharma-Hall" (飛來方丈). There, he founded Gyeongboksa (景福寺), which became the principal monastery of the Nirvāṇa School in Korea.

== Nirvana schools in Japan ==
=== Nehan-shū ===
A Nirvana School later also arose in Japan, though it has no direct connection to the Chinese Nirvana lineage. This was the Nehan-shū (涅槃宗), a short-lived Japanese Buddhist sect that emerged in the late Azuchi-Momoyama (1568 to 1600) period and persisted into the early Edo period. It was founded by Kūgen (空源), a monk who claimed to have attained awakening independently, without the guidance of a teacher. The sect based its doctrine primarily on the Mahāparinirvāṇa Sūtra, and the Lotus Sūtra.

Established in 1592 when Kūgen began teaching in Seimei-chō, Kyoto, Nehan-shū grew quickly. In 1602, Emperor Go-Yōzei conferred upon Kūgen the honorific title Oyō Shōnin (及意上人), and he founded Nehan-ji (涅槃寺) in Kyoto as the sect's head temple. Kūgen and his disciples, such as Kūzen (空禅), were known to maintain clerical marriage, a feature shared with the contemporary Ikkō-shū. Over the next decade, Nehan-shū established several branch temples across western Japan, including in Osaka, Sakai, Settsu, and Ōmi.

However, following the death of Emperor Go-Yōzei in 1617, Nehan-shū faced increasing hostility from rival sects. In late 1617, the sect was formally denounced as heretical to the Kyoto military governor, Itakura Katsushige. Nehan-ji was destroyed, and Kūgen along with other senior figures were arrested and transported to Edo. Kūgen died in custody in 1619. Though the remaining followers were eventually released, the sect never recovered its independence.

In the years that followed, Nehan-shū was absorbed into the Tendai school. The influential Tendai monk Tenkai oversaw its integration into the Sanmyō-in lineage, with Daikaku-ji in Sakamoto, Ōmi, serving as the new head temple from 1627 onward. Nehan-shū continued thereafter as a subordinate line within Tendai. While many former adherents outwardly affiliated with other sects, some, such as Sumitomo Masatomo, maintained private faith in the teachings of Nehan-shū.

=== Shinnyo-en ===
Shinnyo-en (真如苑), a modern Japanese Buddhist movement founded in 1936 by Shinjō Itō and his wife Tomoji, derives its core doctrinal orientation from the Mahāyāna Mahāparinirvāṇa Sūtra. This scripture serves as a central pillar of its teachings, emphasizing the innate Buddha-nature present in all sentient beings and the immanence of nirvana characterized by permanence, bliss, self, and purity. The Nirvana Sūtra's affirmation that all beings have the potential for enlightenment forms the foundation of Shinnyo-en's practical and spiritual path, particularly through its practice of sesshin, wherein practitioners seek spiritual insight and karmic transformation under the guidance of trained religious leaders. The presence of the reclining Buddha, symbolizing the Buddha's final nirvana, is a hallmark of Shinnyo-en temples, further reinforcing the sect's veneration of the Nirvana Sūtra both visually and ritually.

Shinnyo-en's founder, Shinjō Itō, was ordained within the Daigoji lineage of Shingon Buddhism, but he positioned the Nirvana teachings as a means of integrating esoteric doctrine with universal lay accessibility. The community, after facing legal challenges in the 1950s, adopted the name "Shinnyo-en" (literally, "Garden of True Thusness") and built its identity around realizing the teachings of the Nirvana Sūtra within contemporary society. This orientation is seen not only in doctrinal study but also in public rituals such as the Fire and Water Ceremonies, which aim to manifest the Nirvana Sūtra's vision of transcendent, compassionate action in the world. By treating the Nirvana Sūtra as a living teaching rather than a historical document, Shinnyo-en seeks to make its message of universal Buddhahood dynamically relevant to both individual transformation and collective ethical action.

== See also ==
- Chinese Buddhism
- Tiantai
