= Icchantika =

Incorrigible unbeliever in Mahayana Buddhism

In some schools of Mahayana Buddhism, the icchantika (一闡提) is an incorrigible unbeliever who lacks faith in Buddhism and has no prospect of attaining enlightenment.

== Description ==
According to some Mahayana Buddhist scriptures, the icchantika is the most base and spiritually deluded of all types of being. The term implies being given over to total hedonism and greed.

In the Tathagatagarbha sutras, some of which pay particular attention to the icchantikas, the term is frequently used of those persons who do not believe in the Buddha, his eternal Selfhood and his Dharma (Truth) or in karma; who seriously transgress against the Buddhist moral codes and vinaya; and who speak disparagingly and dismissively of the reality of the immortal Buddha-nature (Buddha-dhatu) or Tathagatagarbha present within all beings. (Note: Including icchantikas themselves, though it is more hidden from their consciousness than in other individuals due to the massive accretions of sinfulness and delusion which conceal it from their sight.)

The two shortest versions of the Mahāyāna Mahāparinirvāṇa Sūtra (Faxian's translation and the middle-length Tibetan version) indicate that the icchantika has so totally severed all his/her roots of goodness that he/she can never attain liberation and nirvana or enlightenment (Buddhahood). The full-length Dharmakshema version of the Mahayana Mahaparinirvana Sutra, in contrast, insists that even the icchantika can eventually find release into nirvana, since no phenomenon is fixed (including this type of allegedly deluded person) and that change for the better and best is always a possibility.

Other scriptures (such as the Lankavatara Sutra) indicate that the icchantikas will be saved through the liberational power of the Buddha - who, it is claimed, will never abandon any being.

Buswell notes: "With the prominent exception of the Faxian-School [...], East Asian Buddhists rejected the icchantica-doctrine in favor of the notion that all beings, even the denizens of hell, retained the capacity to attain enlightenment."

== See also ==
- Heresy in Buddhism
- Anantarika-karma, five unforgivable sins in Buddhism that may cause the offender to end up in the lowest hell
- Tao Sheng
- Abomination (Bible)
- Damnation
