= Mahāyāna Mahāparinirvāṇa Sūtra =

Sutra in Mahāyāna Buddhism

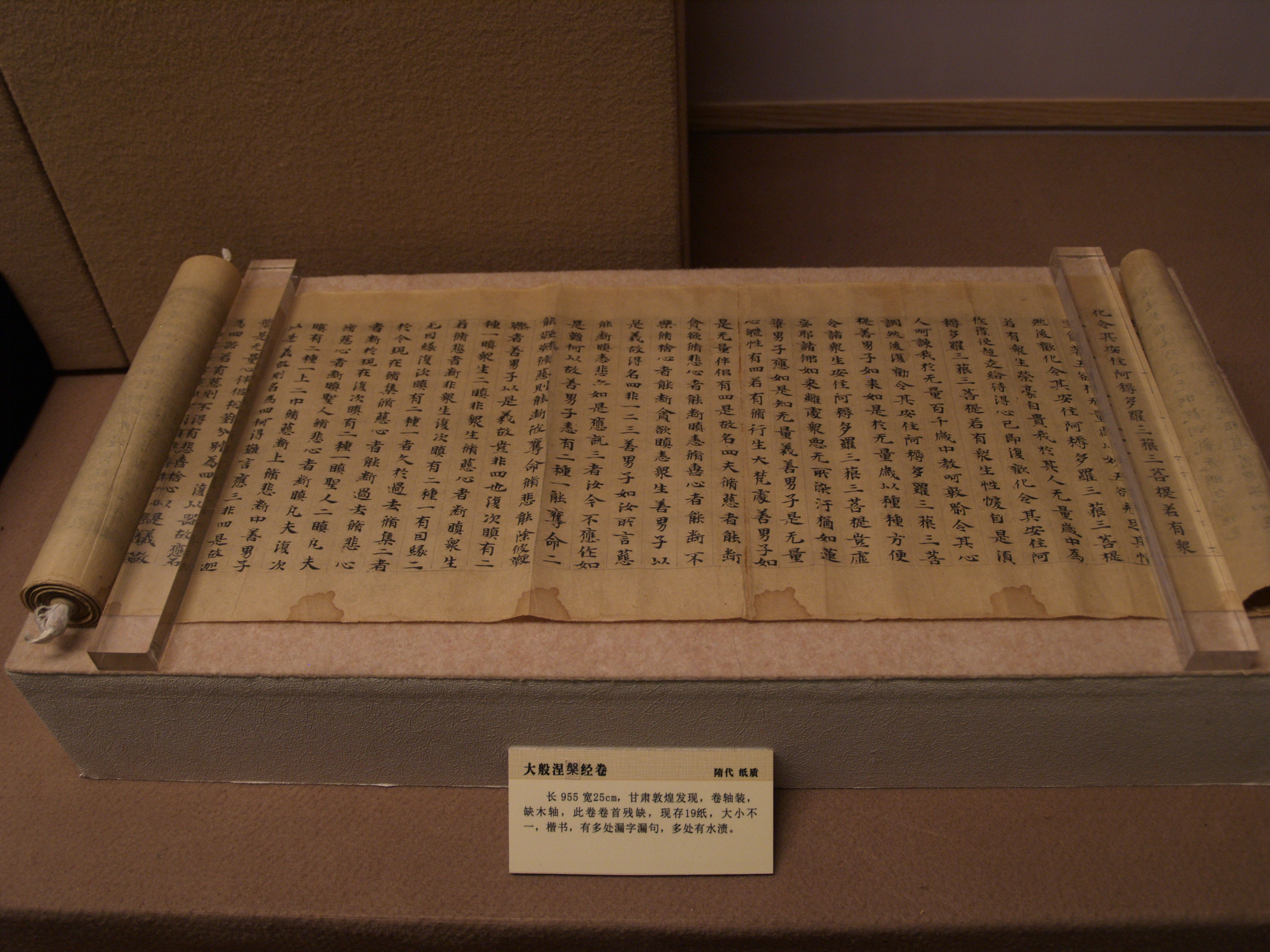
A Sui dynasty manuscript of the Nirvāṇa Sūtra

The Mahāyāna Mahāparinirvāṇa Sūtra (Sanskrit; traditional Chinese: 大般涅槃經; pinyin: Dàbānièpán-jīng; Japanese: Daihatsunehan-gyō, Tibetan: མྱ ངནལས་དསཀྱི མྡོ; Vietnamese: Kinh Đại Bát Niết Bàn) or Nirvana Sutra for short, is an influential Mahāyāna Buddhist scripture of the Buddha-nature class. (Note: It shares its title with another well-known Buddhist scripture, the Mahaparinibbana Sutta of the Pāli Canon, but is quite different in form and content. It is therefore generally referred to by its full Sanskrit title, Mahāyāna Mahāparinirvāṇa Sūtra, or more commonly simply the Nirvāṇa Sūtra.) The original title of the sutra was Mahāparinirvāṇamahāsūtra (Great Scripture of the Great Perfect Nirvāṇa) and the earliest version of the text was associated with the Mahāsāṃghika-Lokottaravāda school. The sutra was particularly important for the development of East Asian Buddhism and was even the basis for a Chinese Buddhist school, the Nirvana School.

The Nirvana sutra uses the backdrop of the Buddha's final nirvana to discuss the nature of the Buddha, who is described in this sutra as undying and eternal, without beginning or end. The text also discusses the associated doctrine of buddha-nature (tathāgatagarbha) which is said to be a "hidden treasury" within all living beings that is eternal (nitya), blissful, Self (atman), and pure (shudda). Due to this buddha nature, all beings have the capacity to reach Buddhahood. Some scholars like Michael Radich and Shimoda Masahiro think that the Nirvana sutra might be the earliest source for the idea of buddha-nature.

The Nirvana sutra also discusses the teachings of not-self and emptiness, and how they are incomplete unless they are complemented by the teaching of "non-emptiness" and the true self, which is buddha-nature. Furthermore, the Nirvana sutra discusses the idea of the icchantikas, a class of sentient beings who "have little or no chance of liberation." The icchantika idea is discussed in various ways throughout the different versions of the sutra, and the issue is complex, though as Blum writes the Nirvana sutra seems "ambivalent on whether or not icchantikas can attain buddhahood".

The Nirvana sutra's precise date of origin is uncertain, but its early form may have developed in or by the second century CE. The original Sanskrit text is not extant except for a small number of fragments, but it survives in Chinese and Tibetan translation. The Nirvana sutra was translated into Chinese various times. The most important editions are the 416 CE "six fascicle text" and the 421 CE translation of Dharmakṣema, which is about four times longer than the earlier one. This sutra should not be confused with the early Buddhist Mahāparinibbāna Sutta which is not a Mahayana sutra.

== History ==
=== Origins ===
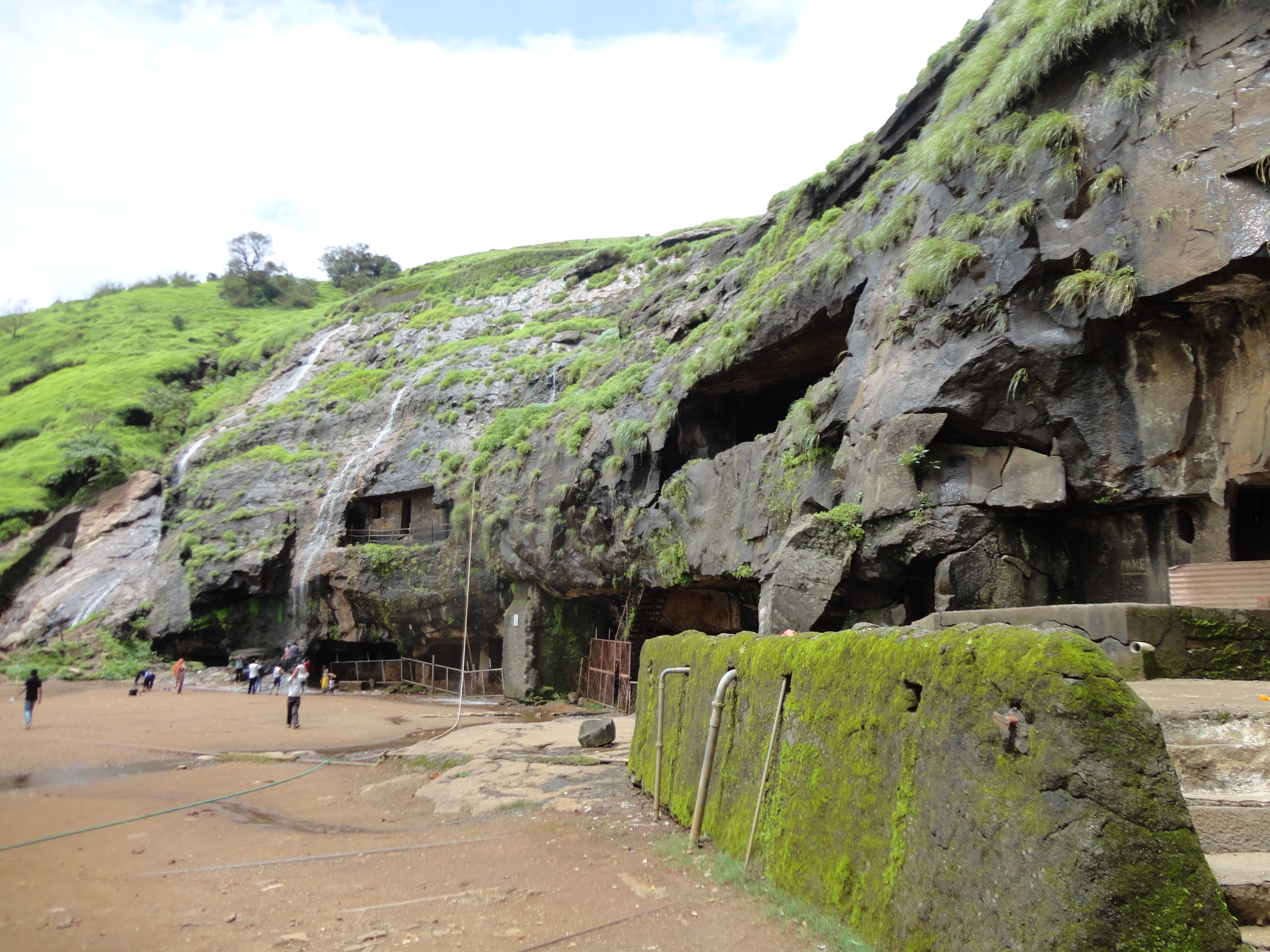
Cave complex associated with the Mahāsāṃghika sect. Karla Caves, Mahārāṣtra, India

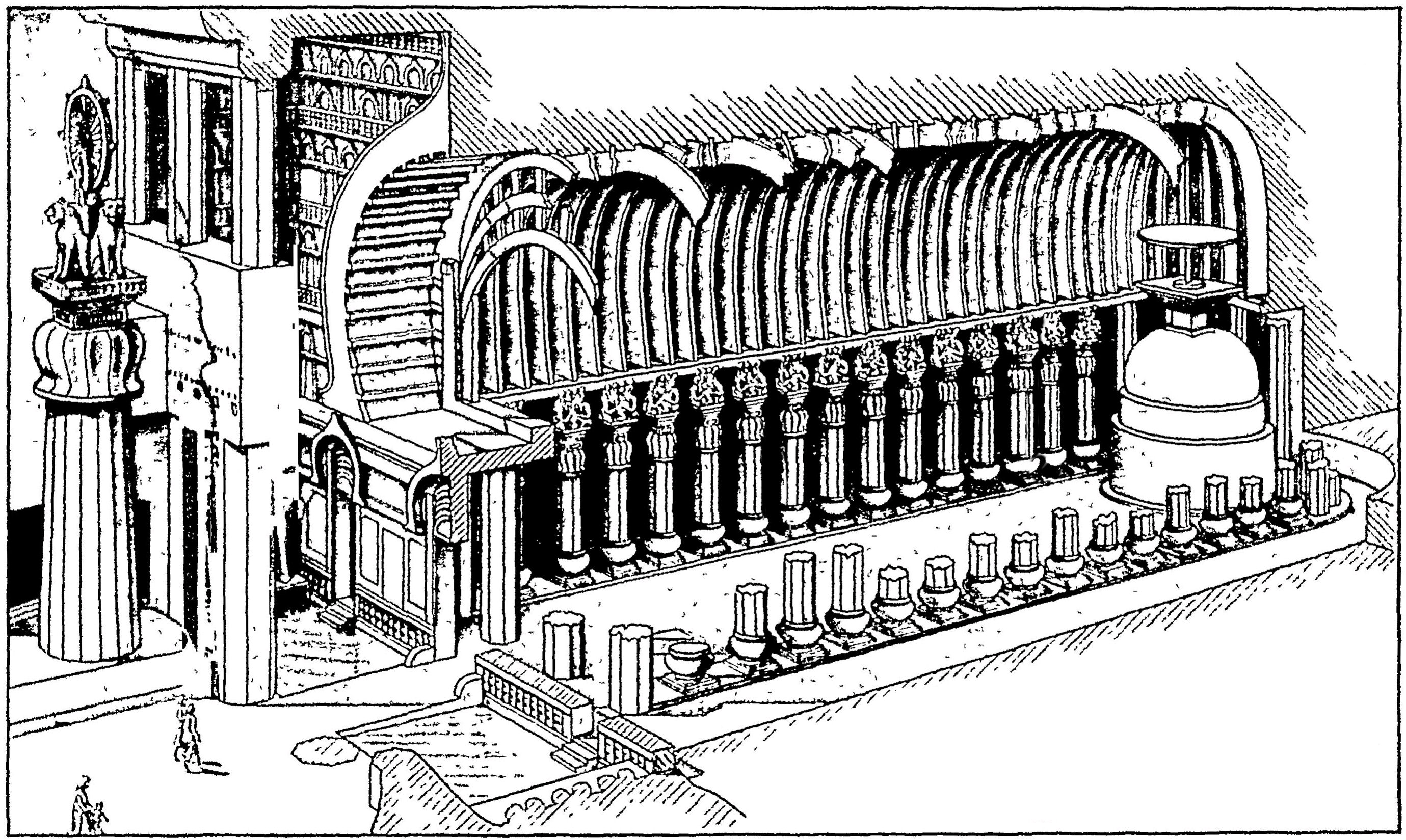
Illustration of a chaitya cave temple, Karla Caves

The history of the text is extremely complex, but the consensus view is that the core portion of this sutra (Note: Corresponding to the shorter Tibetan translation, the six fascicle (juan) Chinese translation attributed to Faxian, and the first ten fascicles of the Dharmakṣema Chinese translation.) was compiled in South India (dakṣiṇāpatha), possibly in Andhra or some part of the Deccan.

The language used in the sūtra and related texts seems to indicate a region in southern India during the time of the Śātavāhana dynasty, likely the 2nd century CE. The Śātavāhana rulers gave rich patronage to Buddhism, and were involved with the development of the cave temples at Karla and Ajaṇṭā, and also with the Great Amarāvati Stupa. During this time, the Śātavāhana dynasty also maintained extensive links with the Kuṣāṇa Empire. Hodge argues that it is likely that the text was composed "in a Mahāsāṃghika environment" like Karli or Amaravatī-Dhanyakaṭaka. Hiromi Habata likewise associated the sutra with the Mahāsāṃghika-Lokottaravāda school.

According to Stephen Hodge, internal textual evidence in the Aṅgulimālīya Sūtra, Mahābheri Sūtra, and the Nirvāṇa indicates that these texts initially circulated in South India, but then gradually began to be propagated in the northwest (especially in Kashmir). Hodge notes that the Nirvana sutra contains prophesies of its own emergence during a period of Dharma decline (which can be calculated to be in around 220 CE) along with prophesies that the text will be taken to Kashmir (罽賓). Hodge also discusses an important person named Sarvasattvapriyadarśana who appears in a group of texts related to the Nirvana sutra like the Aṅgulimāla and the Lotus sutra (he is also called Sarvalokapriyadarśana in the Mahāmegha and Mahābherīhāraka). This figure is connected with the teaching of the eternity of the Buddha and is said to have been born during the a Śātavāhana king (a prophesy placed in the mouth of the Buddha himself in some sources). According to Hodge, Sarvasattvapriyadarśana may have been a historical figure connected to the Nirvana sutra lineage (even its founder) in south India. After the situation in the south became unfavorable for this tradition, it was taken to Kashmir, where later parts of the text were written, reflecting the decline narrative of some parts of the text.

Shimoda Masahiro proposes that the earliest part of the Nirvana sutra is related to the views and practices of itinerant dharma preachers called dharmakathikas or dharmabhāṇakas (說法者 or 法師). These figures frequently went on pilgrimage to stūpa sites in the company of laypeople who were allowed to protect them with swords and staves. They may have also believed in the eternal nature of the Buddha and his vajra body. According to Shimoda, the authors of the Nirvana sutra, as advocates of stupa worship, would have known how the term buddhadhātu originally referred to śarīra or physical relics of the Buddha. According to Shimoda's theory, these figures used the teachings of the Tathāgatagarbha Sūtra to reshape the worship of the śarīra into worship of the inner Buddha as a principle of salvation: the Buddha-nature. Sasaki states that a key premise of Shimoda's work is that the origins of Mahayana and the Mahāparinirvāṇa are entwined.

Scholars like Shimoda as well as Michael Radich argue that the Nirvana sutra might be the earliest source for the tathāgatagarbha doctrine.

=== Dating ===
Scholars believe that the compilation of the core portion (corresponding to the six fascicle Chinese translation and the shorter Tibetan translation) must have occurred at an early date, during or prior to the 2nd century CE, based internal evidence and on Chinese canonical catalogs.

Using textual evidence in the Mahāyāna Mahāparinirvāṇa Sūtra and related texts, Stephen Hodge estimates a compilation period between 100 CE and 220 CE for the core sutra.

The Indian version of the Mahāparinirvāṇa Sūtra underwent a number of stages in its composition. Masahiro Shimoda discerns several main stages:

1. a short proto-Nirvāṇa Sūtra, which was, he argues, probably not distinctively Mahāyāna, but quasi-Mahāsāṃghika in origin and would date to 100 CE, if not even earlier;
2. an expanded version of this core text was then developed and would have comprised chapters 1, 2, 3, 4, 6 and 7 of the six fascicle text and shorter Tibetan versions, though it is believed that in their present state there is a degree of editorial addition in them from the later phases of development.
3. Chapter 8 of the six fascicle text.
4. Ch. 5, and Ch. 9 onwards of the six fascicle text.

=== In East Asia ===
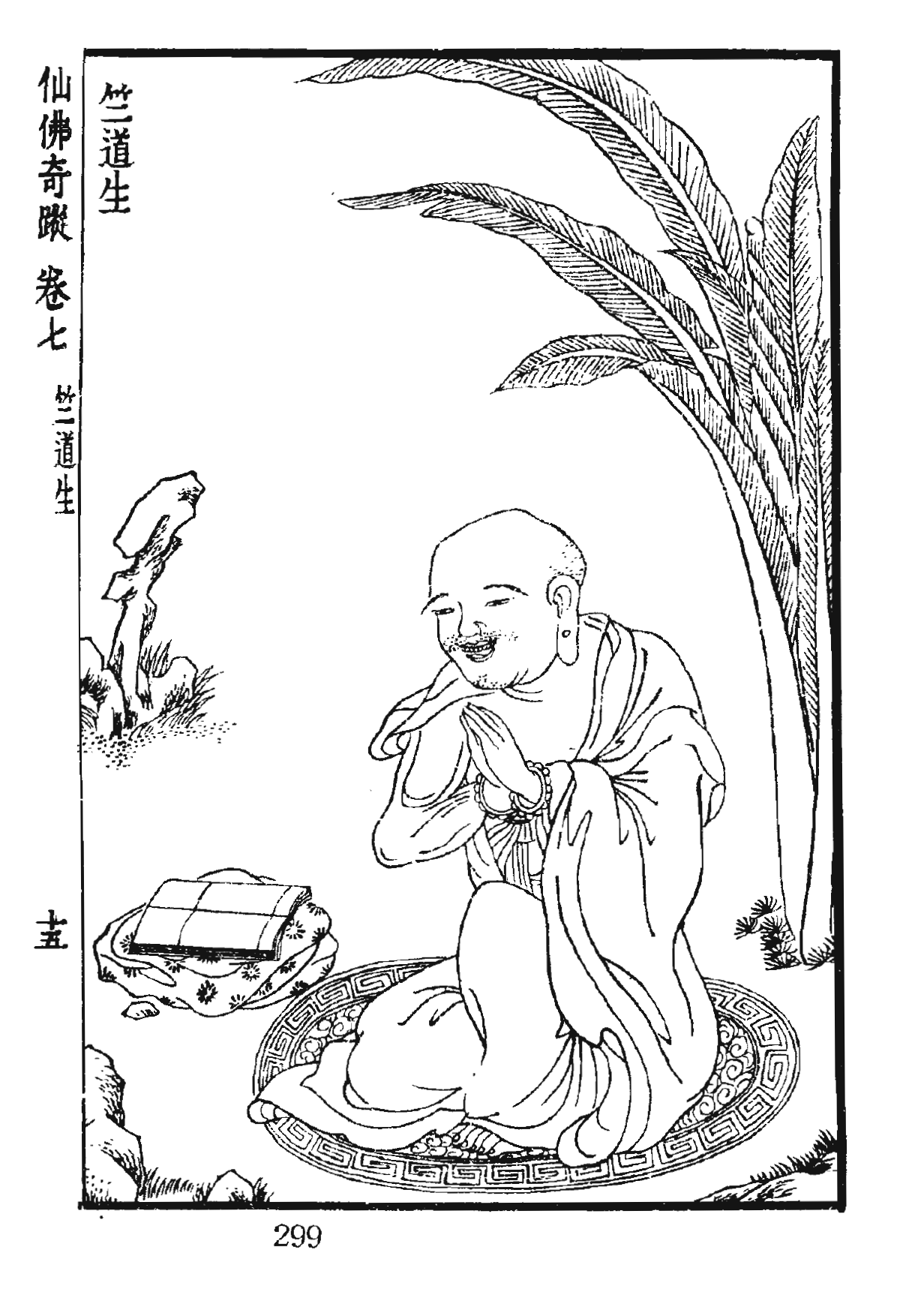
Daosheng, a great Chinese commentator and scholar of the Nirvana sutra. His work promoted the "northern" translation by Dharmakṣema and the universality of buddha-nature and Buddhahood, even for icchantikas, the most dogmatic of persons.

The Nirvana sutra is an extremely influential work for East-Asian Buddhism. It was translated various times and two major Chinese translations are extant. The translation by Dharmakṣema (c. 385–433) is significantly longer and this has led some scholars to argue that the latter portions of this edition were composed in China. This longer edition was also the most important and popular one in China, Japan and Korea, since it promoted the universality of Buddha nature and Buddhahood. The six fascicle version on the other hand was mostly ignored according to Blum.

Dharmakṣema's Nirvana sutra inspired numerous sutra commentaries and is cited widely by numerous East Asian Buddhist authors. The sutra was a key scriptural source for the idea that all sentient beings have buddha-nature, which was seen as an active force in the world. It was also influential due to its teachings promoting vegetarianism and its teachings on the eternal nature of the Buddha. All these doctrines became central teachings of Chinese Buddhism.

In the Southern Dynasties (420-589) period, there was a Chinese Buddhist school devoted to the Dharmakṣema Nirvana sutra, which was simply called the "Nirvana School" (nièpán-zong) and was also influenced by the works of Daosheng. This school taught the universality of Buddha nature and the capacity for even icchantikas to attain Buddhahood. The school thrived in the Liang dynasty (502-557) and many of its teachings were incorporated into the Tiantai school. During the Liang, the school's teachings were supplemented by the teachings of the Tattvasiddhi-Śāstra by scholars like Pao-liang (d. 509).

The Nirvana sutra was also seen as a key sutra for both the Tiantai and the Huayan schools, the main doctrinal schools of Chinese Buddhism. The key Tiantai exegete Zhiyi even saw the sutra as a final teaching of the Buddha and as being of equal status to the Lotus Sutra.

Due to its status in these doctrinal traditions, it also became important for numerous Japanese Buddhist schools like Zen, Nichiren and Shin Buddhism. The work is cited by key Japanese Buddhist figures like Dōgen, Nichiren and Shinran. The Nirvana Sutra is among the most important sources and influences on Shinran's magnum opus, Kyogyoshinsho. Shinran relies on crucial passages from the Nirvana Sutra for the more theoretical elaboration of the meaning of shinjin. Similarly, the Nirvana is a key source for Dōgen's view of buddha-nature.

== Teachings ==
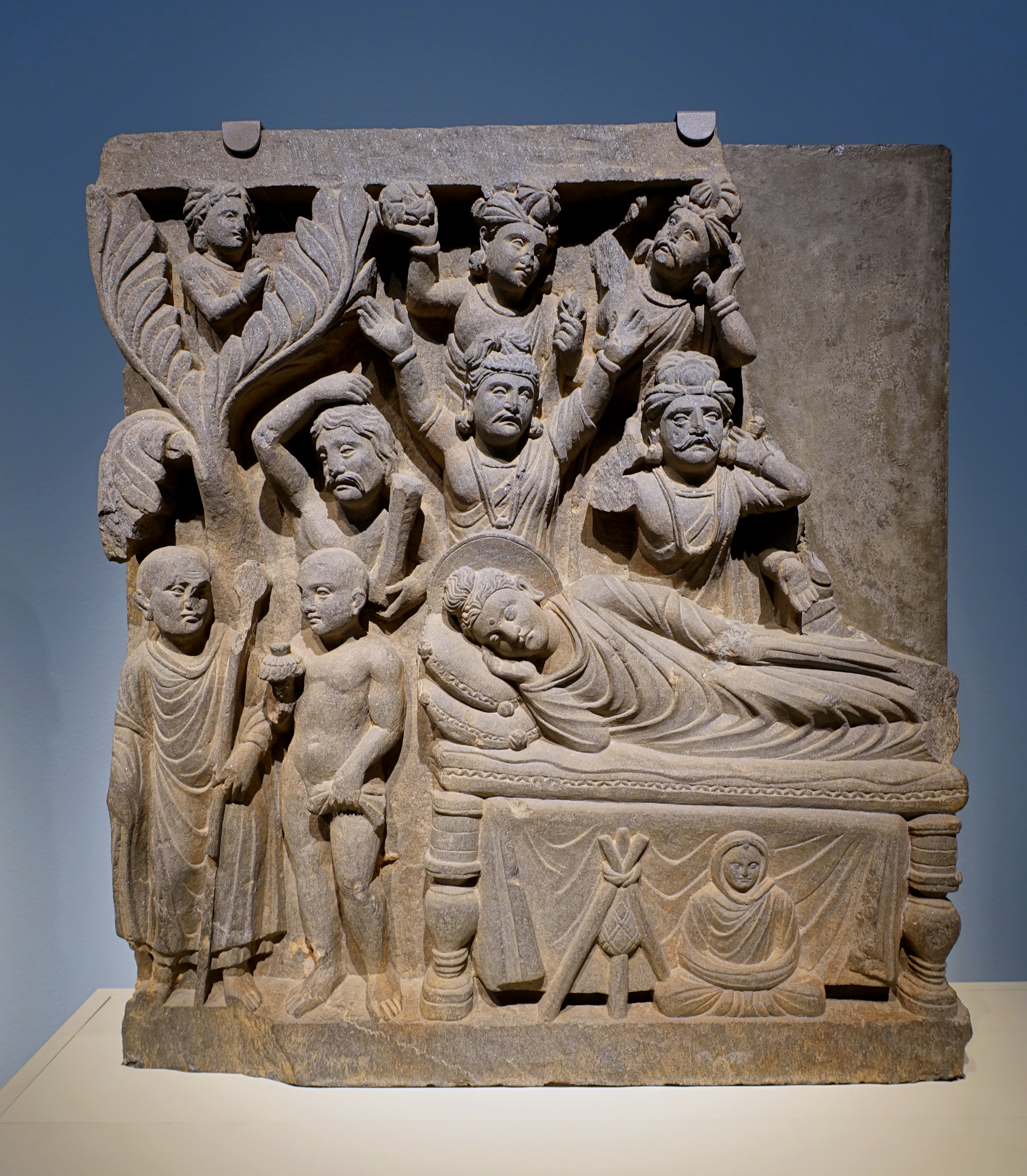
Parinirvana scene in schist, Kushan dynasty, late 2nd to early 3rd century CE, Gandhara.

Chinese illustration of the Nirvana sutra

The Nirvana sutra's setting is the final hours of the Buddha's life. Unlike the early Buddhist Mahaparanibbana sutta, Ananda, the Buddha's attendant, is mostly absent from the Nirvana sutra (instead, the main interlocutor is Mañjuśrī). The Nirvana sutra also ends with the Buddha lying down, but it does not depict his actual parinirvāṇa, nor does it depict the cremation, and other episodes after his death, like the division of relics and Mahakasyapa paying respect to his body etc.

According to Sallie B. King, the Nirvana sutra is somewhat unsystematic and this made it a fruitful sutra for later commentators who drew on it for various doctrinal and exegetical purposes. King notes that the most important innovation of the Nirvana is the linking of the term buddhadhātu (buddha-nature) with tathagatagarbha (tathagata womb/chamber). The buddha-dhātu (buddha-nature, buddha-element) is presented as a timeless, eternal (nitya) and pure "Self" (ātman). This notion of a buddhist theory of a true self (i.e. a Buddhist ātma-vada) is a radical one which caused much controversy and was interpreted in many different ways.

Other important doctrinal themes in the Nirvana sutra include re-interpretations of not-self (anātman) and emptiness (Śūnyatā) as a skillful means that paves the way for the ultimate buddha-nature teachings, the doctrine of the icchantika, the eternal and docetic (lokottara) nature of Shakyamuni Buddha and his adamantine body (vajra-kaya), the promotion of vegetarianism, and a teaching on the decline of the Buddha's Dharma.

=== The Eternal Buddha ===
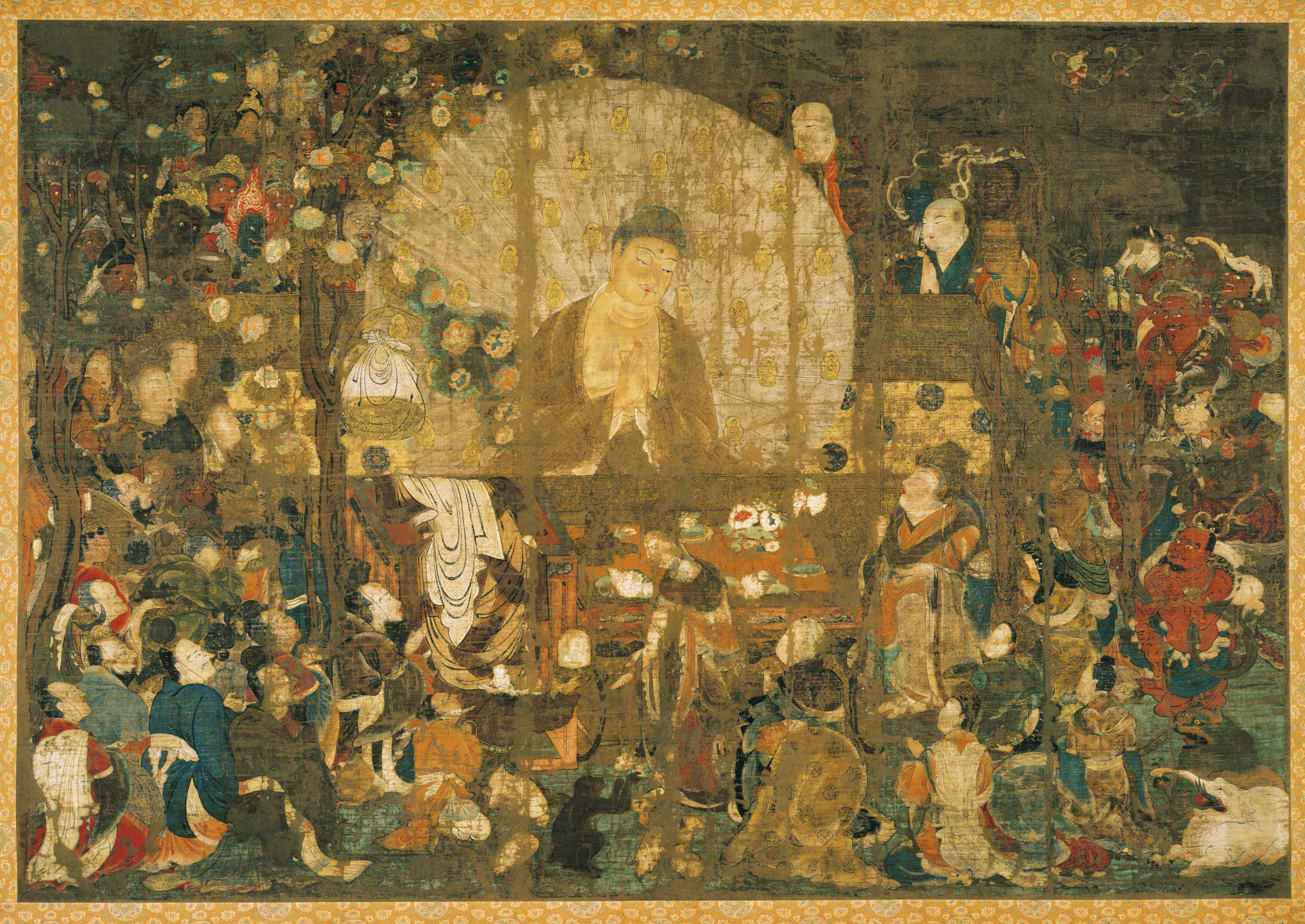
Shakyamuni Buddha's transcendent body arising from his golden tomb (絹本著色釈迦金棺出現図), 11th century Heian period Hanging scroll, Kyoto National Museum.

A key teaching found in the Nirvana sutra is the eternal nature of the Buddha. Blum notes that the sutra makes it clear that the Buddha is not subject to the processes of birth and death, but abides forever in an undying state. While the Buddha will appear to die (and manifest parinirvāṇa, his final nirvana, the apparent death of his body), he is in fact eternal and immortal, since he was never born, and had no beginning or end. The sutra states:

The body of the Tathāgata is an eternal body (*nityakāya), an indestructible body (*abhedakāya), an adamant body (*vajrakāya); it is not a body sustained by various kinds of food. That is to say, it is the Dharma Body (*dharmakāya). Do not say now that the body of the Tathāgata is soft, can easily be broken, and is the same as that of common mortals. O good man! Know now that for countless billions of kalpas, the body of the Tathāgata has been strong, firm, and indestructible.

The Nirvana sutra thus presents the Buddha as an eternal and transcendent being (lokottara) who is beyond being and non-being and is Thusness (tathata), the ultimate reality, the eternal Dharmakāya or "dharma body" (which is equivalent to the buddha-body). The sutra also states that the Buddha's body (buddhakaya) is an eternal, unchanging, unimpeded, and indivisible adamantine body (abhedavajrakāya). As such, while he appears to die, his "transcendent, indestructible mode of being" is something that never truly dies, being uncompounded (asaṃskṛta). The Nirvana sutra further equates the Dharmakāya with the buddha-nature and states that it has four perfections (pāramitās): permanence, bliss, purity, and selfhood.

According to Shimoda and Radich, this theme is the central theme of what is perhaps the earliest textual layer of the Nirvana sutra. Radich also notes that the Nirvana sutra refers to itself by alternative titles, including Tathāgataśāśvata-sūtra/Tathāgatanityatva-sūtra, which indicate the eternity of the Tathāgata.

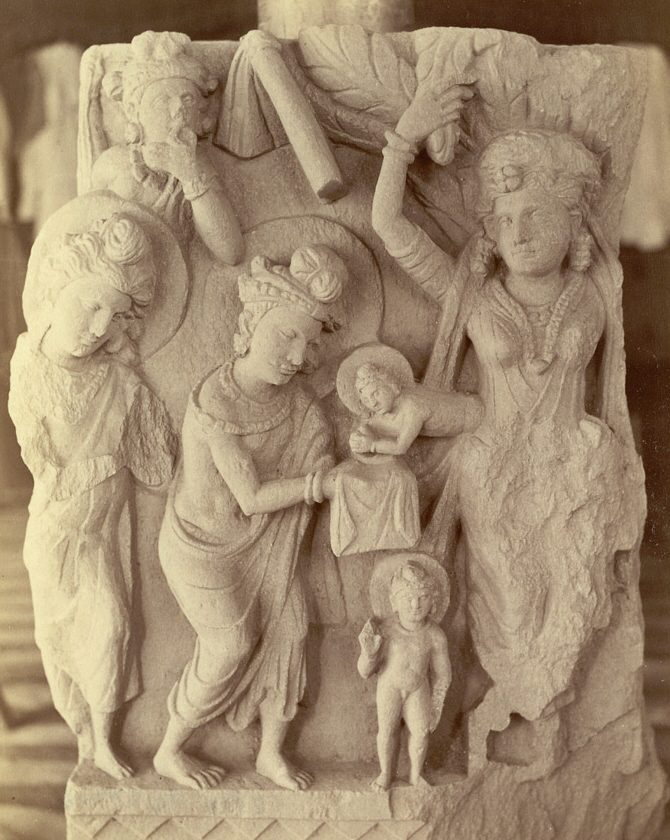
Gandharan depiction of the Miraculous birth of the Buddha (from Lorian Tangai). Some scholar like Radich have argued that the doctrines of the Nirvana sutra developed out of earlier miraculous accounts of the Buddha's gestation and birth.

A key element of the doctrine of the eternal buddha-body is a kind of Mahayana docetism, the idea that the Buddha's physical birth and death on earth was a mere appearance, a conventional show for the sake of helping sentient beings (a doctrine which was already found in the Mahāsāṃghika school). According to the Nirvana sutra, the Buddha entered nirvāṇa aeons ago (and yet remains actively benefiting beings). As such, the Buddha merely appears to be born, practice the path, achieve nirvana and die in order to be "in accordance with the world" (lokānuvartanā, Ch. suishun shijian, 隨順世間) so that people would trust him as a human sage. However, in reality, his nature is eternal and unchanging. As the Buddha says in the Nirvana sutra, "at times, I show [myself entering into] parinirvāṇa in the Jambudvīpas of a billion worlds, and yet, ultimately, I do not take parinirvāṇa.”

According to Radich, the tathāgatagarbha idea in the Nirvana sutra is closely related to the positive elements of this docetic Buddhology, which refers to the idea that since the Buddha did not have a normal human body (nor did he gestate in a normal womb), he must have had some other transcendent type of body (which requires a transcendent womb, the tathāgata-garbha, "buddha womb").

=== Buddha-nature ===
The doctrine of the "buddha-dhātu" (buddha-nature, buddha-element, Chinese: 佛性 foxing, Tibetan: sangs rgyas gyi khams), which refers to the fundamental nature of the Buddha, is a central teaching of the Nirvana sutra. According to the Nirvana sutra, "all sentient beings possess buddha-nature without distinction" (Chinese:一切眾生皆有佛性而無差別). According to Sally King, the sutra speaks about Buddha-nature in many different ways. This led Chinese scholars to create a list of types of buddha-nature that could be found in the text.

The Nirvana sutra also equates buddha-nature with the term tathāgatagarbha (which is also done by other texts like the Aṅgulimālīya, Mahābherī, and Uttaratantra). According to King, this can be understood as an "embryonic tathāgata" or as the "womb of the tathāgata". The Chinese typically translated the term as 如來藏 rúlái zàng ("tathāgata storehouse," "tathāgata matrix", or "tathāgata chamber"). However, according to Mark Blum, Dharmaksema translates tathāgatagārbha as Chinese: 如來密藏; pinyin: rúlái mìzàng or simply mìzàng, "tathagata's hidden treasury". This treasury is seen as a wondrous liberating truth that is mysteriously hidden from the view of ordinary people. Blum notes that the two major Chinese versions of the sutra don't use the literal Chinese term for embryo or womb, but speak of the "wondrous interior treasure-house of the Buddha" which is always present within all beings. This inner treasure, a pure "buddha-relic" within, is obscured by the negative mental afflictions of each sentient being. Once these negative mental states have been eliminated, however, buddha-nature is said to shine forth unimpededly.

The Nirvana sutra's explanation of buddha-nature is multifaceted and complex. Karl Brunnhölzl argues that there three main meanings of buddha-nature in the Nirvana sutra: (1) an intrinsic pure nature that merely has to be revealed, (2) a seed or potential that can grow into Buddhahood with the right conditions, (3) the idea that the Mahayana path is open to all. The Nirvana sutra states that buddha-nature as buddhahood is endowed with the powers and qualities of a buddha is free of any karma or affliction (klesha), transcending the five skandhas and the twelve links of dependent arising. However, in order to become true Buddhas, sentient beings need to practice the six pāramitās which actualize their buddha potential into full Buddhahood. This is compared to how milk is made into cream or butter through additional conditions. As such, the Nirvana sutra criticizes those who think that buddha-nature means that all beings are already full Buddhas and do not need to practice the bodhisattva path.

However, other similes in the Nirvana sutra contain slightly different characterizations of buddha-nature. For example, one simile compares the buddha nature to a treasure buried under the earth, or a to a gold mine (both which are found in the Tathāgatagarbhasūtra, which is cited by name in the Nirvana sutra). These similes suggest a more immanent understanding of buddha-nature in which the buddha element is merely something to be revealed. Furthermore, other similes reject the idea that buddha-nature abides in sentient beings at all, stating that buddha-nature abides nowhere, like how the sound made by a lute is not located in any part of the lute.

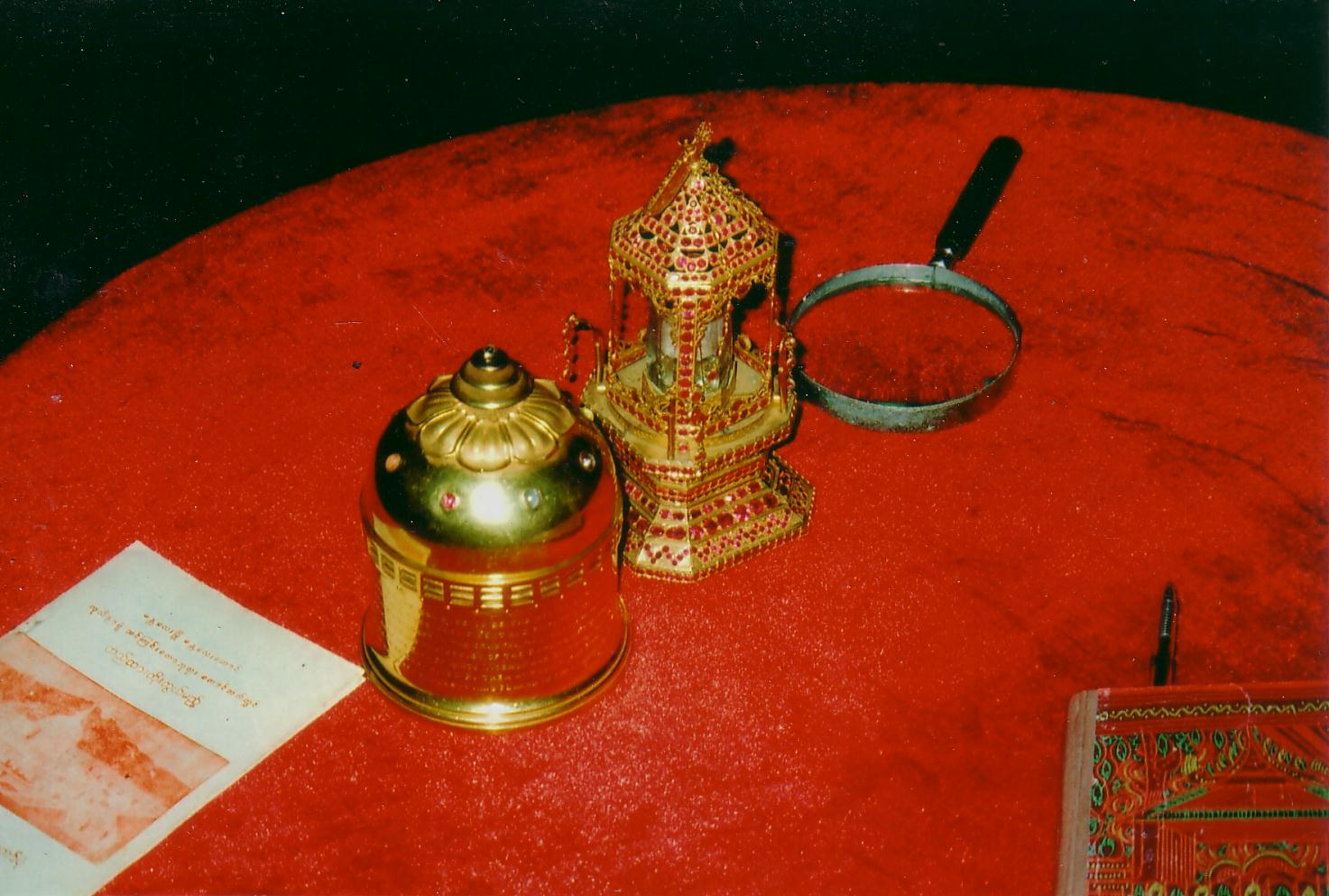
Buddha relics which were originally housed inside the chamber (garbha) of Kanishka's stupa in Peshawar, Pakistan.

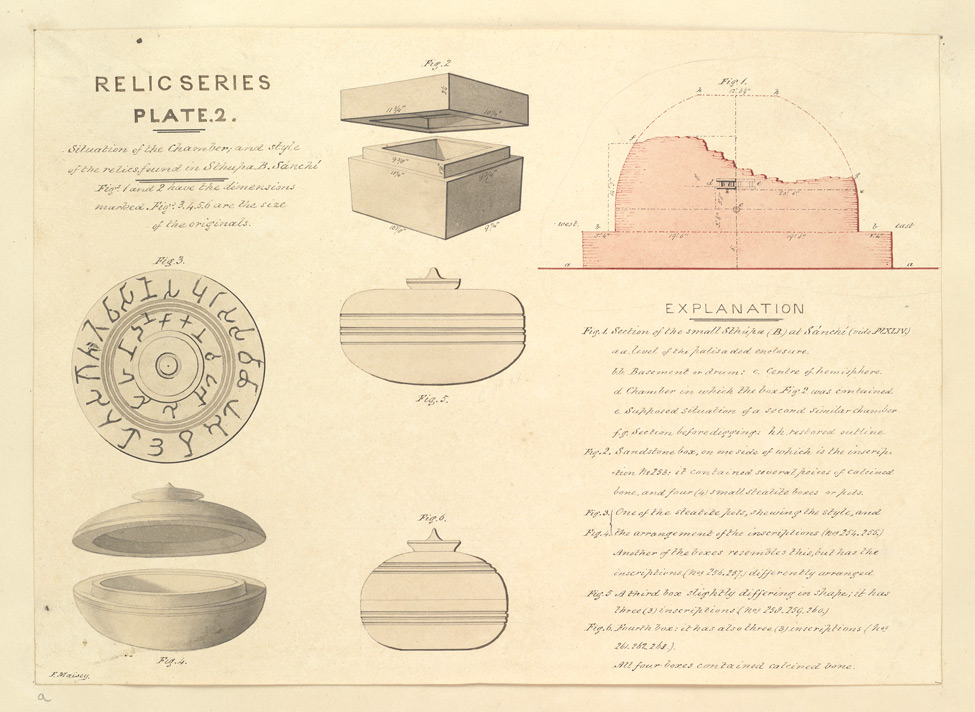
Illustration of the reliquary and relic chamber of found in the Sanchi Stupa No. 2 by Frederick Charles Maisey, published 1850.

The Indic term dhātu was used in early Buddhism to refer to the relics of a Buddha as well as to basic constituents of reality or "raw material" (like the eighteen "dhātus" that make up any personality). The Nirvana sutra draws on this term and applies it to the true nature of a Buddha, which is permanent (nitya), pure, blissful and resides within all sentient beings (analogous to how the pure buddha relics were housed inside a stupa). Some scholars like Shimoda and Radich have seen the buddha-nature idea as arising from an internalization of stupa and relic worship. Instead of worshiping relics externally, the buddha-nature teaching turns inward, to the inner buddha relic in all of us. According to Jones, the term tathāgatagarbha could also have referred to "the chamber (garbha) for a Buddha (tathāgata): the space at the center of a stūpa, where lies hidden that which is essential to a Buddha and most precious to the world after his (apparent) departure from it." The term “chamber for a relic” (dhātugarbha) is attested in many Buddhist texts. Due to this, Radich argues that the term tathāgatagarbha also developed as an internalized buddha relic which came to refer to the presence of a buddha's qualities, mode of being or body which was not located in a stupa but in sentient beings.

Another key aspect of the buddha-nature as taught in the Nirvana sutra is that it can only be directly perceived by a fully awakened Buddha, though the sutra says that a bodhisattva at the tenth stage (bhūmi) can also perceive buddha-nature in an imperfect and indistinct manner. Since according to the Nirvana sutra, "the nature of the Tathāgata is difficult to see", the sutra emphasizes the importance of faith (śraddhā) in both the Nirvana sutra itself and in the buddha-nature, saying that "only one who follows the teachings of the Tathāgata, faithfully committing oneself to them, after that sees their equality [to the Buddha]."

==== Buddhadhātu as ātman and the four perfections ====
The Nirvana sutra describes Buddhahood and buddha-nature as a true self (ātman), a “supreme essence” (Tibetan: snying po’i mchog) and as a "great self" (mahātman, 大我) that is eternal, pure and blissful, and is also separate from the five aggregates and beyond samsaric phenomena. For example, the sutra states:

The real self is the nature of the Tathāgata ( 如來性). Know that all sentient beings have this, but as those sentient beings are enshrouded by immeasurable afflictions, it is not manifested.

The Indic term "ātman" generally referred to "the permanent and indestructible essence, or an unchanging central element, of any human or other sentient being", and the idea that such a thing existed was widely rejected by mainstream Indian Buddhism. In teaching the existence of a permanent element (Tibetan: yang dag khams) in sentient beings that allows them to become Buddhas, the sutra is self consciously adopting a Buddhist version of ātmavāda (“teaching of self”) which was popular in Indian thought, while also modifying the Buddhist doctrine of not-self (anātman) that completely rejected any notion of a self.

The teaching that the buddha-nature is a self is one of the "four inversions" (viparyāsas), a key theme in the Nirvana sutra. Early Buddhism held that living beings have four distortions in how they perceive reality: they see what is impermanent as permanent (nitya), they see what is not-self as a self (ātman), they see what is impure as pure (śubha/śuci) and they see what is suffering as being pleasant or blissful (sukha). The Nirvana sutra claims that while these four do apply to samsaric phenomena, when it comes to the "supreme dharma(s)" (zhenshifa 真實法, *paramadharma, like Buddha and buddha-nature), the opposite is the case. As the sutra states:

Monks, whatever you mentally cultivate, repeatedly and increasingly and with full acceptance, to be in all instances impermanent, unsatisfactory, without self, and impure, amid these there is that which exhibits permanence, bliss, purity and selfhood...

As such, the Nirvana sutra claims that buddha-nature (and the Buddha's body, his Dharmakaya) is characterized by four perfections (pāramitās) or qualities (which are denied in classic Buddhist doctrine): permanence (nitya), bliss (sukha), self (ātman), and purity (śuddha). The four perfections as a feature of buddha-nature is also found in the Śrīmālādevī sūtra.

==== "Self" and "not-self" as skillful means ====
Paul Williams also notes that while we can speak of the tathāgatagarbha as a Self, this is a much more complex issue since the sutra also speaks of the importance of the not-self teaching, saying that those who have notions of a self cannot perceive buddha-nature.

The Nirvana sutra is aware that there are numerous non-buddhist accounts of a self which might sound similar to its own self theory and it argues that if they seem similar, this is due to two reasons. The first is that non-buddhist ātmavāda theories are often misinterpretations or misrememberings of what was taught by a bodhisattva and the second is that they may be skillful means taught to non-buddhists by Buddhas and bodhisattvas. Furthermore, numerous non-buddhist doctrines of a self are rejected in the Nirvana sutra (including some of the theories taught in the Upanishads), in which the self is "some kernel of identity hidden within the body" which is a "person" (pudgala), a jīva, a "doer" (kartṛ) or a "master" (zhu 主). According to Williams, the "Self" taught in the Nirvana sutra "is not a Self in the worldly sense taught by non-Buddhist thinkers, or maintained to exist by the much-maligned ‘man in the street’", since these are considered to lead to egoistic grasping.

Thus, the Nirvana sutra often portrays the teaching of the tathāgatagarbha as a Self as being a skillful means, a useful strategy to convert non-buddhists and to combat annihilationist interpretations of the Dharma. For example, in Nirvana sutra, the Buddha proclaims "I do not teach that all sentient beings are without a self! I constantly teach that all sentient beings possess Buddha-nature; is Buddha-nature not the self? Hence, I have not taught an annihilationist view." The Buddha then states the reason he teaches not-self (and impermanence, suffering, and impurity) is because sentient beings do not see the buddha-nature. Later on in the sutra, the Buddha also states:

Good son, this Buddha-nature is in truth not the self; for the benefit of sentient beings is it called the self.… Buddha-nature is absence of self, [but] the Tathāgata teaches the self [for the sake of some audiences]: because of his permanence, the Tathāgata is the self, but he teaches absence of self, because he has achieved sovereignty [zizai 自在, possibly Skt. aiśvarya].

Thus, according to the Nirvana sutra, the Buddha uses the term self when needed (to overcome nihilistic interpretations of not-self) and teaching not-self when needed (to overcome grasping at what is not the self). This is part of his skillful means (upaya) to guide beings to liberation.

The Nirvana sutra states that those who see everything as empty and fail to see what is not empty do not know the true middle way. Likewise, those who see everything as not-self but fail to see what is Self also fail to see the true middle way, which is the buddha nature. According to Mark Blum, the Nirvana sutra sees the Buddhist doctrine of not-self as "a very important doctrine to be expounded when the listener is attached to his or her notion of selfhood or personality, because it deconstructs that object of attachment, revealing its nature as a fantasy." However, the sutra understands both the not-self and emptiness teachings as being skillful means, not ultimate truths. The Nirvana sutra also affirms the truth of "non-emptiness", which is a real genuine self, the buddha-nature.

The Nirvana sutra compares the not-self teaching to a milk-based medicine which is useful for certain ailments, but not for all. Because of this, a physician who only prescribed this single medicine would be an unskillful one. The Buddha in the Nirvana sutra says he taught not-self in order to get rid of certain mistaken views of self in order that the correct teaching about the self (i.e. the buddha-nature) could be given. This is why according to the Nirvana sutra, "the Buddha teaches that the nature of the Tathāgata (如來性) is the real self (真實我), but if with respect to this tenet one mentally cultivates [the thought] that it is not the self, this is called the third distortion."

Using another medicinal simile, the Nirvana sutra compares the teaching of not-self to a medicine which requires a mother to stop breast feeding her infant. The mother thus smears her breast with a pungent ointment and tells her child that it is poison. When the medicine is fully ingested, the mother removes the ointment and invites the child to nurse at her breast again. In this simile, the medicine is the skillful notion of not-self, and the mother's milk is the teaching of "the nature of the Tathāgata, which is the supermundane, supreme self" (離世真實之我, possibly *lokottaraparamātman).

Another important element of the relationship between not-self and true self in the Nirvana sutra is that they are seen as non-dual (advaya), as two sides of the same coin so to speak. Thus, according to the Nirvana: "the wise know that the existence of the self and absence of self are non-dual." In making this claim, the sutra also cites two sutras, the Sarvapuṇyasamuccayasūtra (possibly Taisho no. 381–382) and a Prajñāpāramitā sutra (the most likely candidate being the Suvikrāntavikrāmiparipṛcchā).

=== Icchantikas ===
Despite the fact that the Buddha-nature is innate in all sentient beings, there is a class of people who called icchantikas ("extremists" or "dogmatists") which are either excluded from Buddhahood or will find it very difficult to ever reach it. The Nirvana sutra discusses this class of people often. According to scholars like Blum and Brunnhölzl, the exact status and nature of the icchantika in the Nirvana sutra is difficult to ascertain, as the topic is discussed in different ways throughout the sutra. In some parts, icchantikas are said to be like scorched seeds who can never sprout and thus of being incurable and incapable of Buddhahood. In other passages, they are said to also possess buddha-nature and to be able to attain buddhahood (their potential for buddhahood is also depicted much more positively in the longer versions of the sutra). As such, the icchantika doctrine has caused much controversy and debate in East Asian Buddhism.

According to Karashima, the word icchantika derives from the verb icchati (to claim, to hold, to maintain) and the term is thus best understood as "someone who [makes] claims; an opinionated [person]." Specifically, the icchantika is someone who rejects and is hostile to the buddha nature teaching of the Nirvana sutra.

The Nirvana sutra describes them as follows:

[A]ny person, no matter whether they are a monk, a nun, a lay-man or lay-woman, who rejects this sûtra with abusive words, and does not even ask for forgiveness afterwards, has entered the icchantika path.

In spite of their hostile dogmatism, the longer version of the Nirvana Sutra explains that because all beings have the buddha-nature, all beings without exception, even icchantikas (the most incorrigible and spiritually base of beings), can eventually attain liberation and become Buddhas. This is possible if they gain faith in buddha-nature, as the Dharmakṣema translation of the Nirvana states: "If an icchantika were to have faith in the existence of Buddha-nature, know that he will not descend into the three bad [destinies], and also is then not called an icchantika."

=== Decline of the Dharma ===
Parts of the Nirvana Sutra are very concerned with the decline of the Dharma and with eschatology, describing how in the times of Dharma decline, there will be false monks, false teachings and all sorts of calamities. Hodge argues that the earliest portion of the sutra was written in India by people who believed they were living in an age of decline in which the Buddha-dharma would perish. The sutra states that during the age of Dharma decline, the Mahayana sutras will be lost (including the Nirvana sutra itself), false teachings will spread, and monks will act unethically, owning servants, cattle and horses, and engaging in lay jobs like farming, smithing, painting, sculpture and divination (instead of focusing on the Dharma).

The sutra responds to this situation of decline with the proclamation of the innate Buddhahood that is present in all (though it remains concealed by the defilements). The Nirvana sutra sees itself as the final teaching of the Buddha that has the power to lead people to discover their own innate buddha-nature (as long as they listen to it with faith). As such, it sees itself as the ideal solution to the era of Dharma decline.

== Texts ==
The Indic text of the Mahāparinirvāṇa Sūtra (in Sanskrit) has survived only in a number of fragments, which were discovered in Central Asia, Afghanistan and Japan. Four full editions of the Nirvana sutra of varying lengths survive in Chinese and Tibetan. The fragments are written in Buddhist Hybrid Sanskrit and indicate that they were written by speakers of a Prakrit language.

=== Chinese ===
According to early Chinese sutra catalogues such as the Lidai Sanbao ji (歷代三寶紀), a part of the core portion of the sutra was translated previously into Chinese by Dharmarakṣa (fl. c. 260-280), though this version is now lost. Chinese canonical records also mention that another lost translation was made by the Chinese monk Zhimeng who studied in India from 404-424 CE. According to Zhimeng's own account, he also obtained his manuscript from the same layman in Pataliputra as Faxian did some years earlier.

==== The "six fascicle text" ====
This translation, often called the "Six fascicle text", and titled Dabannihuan jing (大般泥洹經, Taisho no. 376.12.853-899), is the shortest and earliest translation into Chinese. It is attributed to Faxian and Buddhabhadra during the Jin dynasty (266–420) between 416 and 418. Though the translation of this version in six fascicles (juàn 卷) is conventionally ascribed to Faxian (法顯), this attribution is probably inaccurate. According to Faxian's own account, the manuscript copy forming the basis of the six juan Chinese version was obtained by him in Pāṭaliputra from the house of a layman known as Kālasena, during his travels in India. The earliest surviving Chinese sutra catalogue, Sengyou's Chu Sanzang Jiji (出三藏記集), which was written less than 100 years after the date of this translation, makes no mention of Faxian. Instead it states that the translation was done by Buddhabhadra and his assistant Baoyun (寶雲), quoting earlier catalogues to corroborate this attribution. The idea that Faxian was involved in the translation only emerges in later catalogues, compiled several hundred years after the event.

==== Dharmakṣema's "northern" edition ====
The "Northern text", titled Dabanniepan jing (大般涅槃經), is a translation in 40 fascicles (Taisho no. 374.12.365c-603c), completed by the Magadhan Indian monk translator Dharmakṣema (c. 385–433 CE) between 421 and 430 in the Northern Liang kingdom. This "northern" version of the text is "around four times the length" of the "six fascicle" version and the later Tibetan translation, extending for a further thirty fascicles, beyond the first ten fascicles of the "core" sutra material. This version was also later translated into Classical Tibetan from the Chinese.

The first ten fascicles of the northern edition may be based on a birch-bark manuscript from North-Western India that Dharmakṣema brought with him, which he used for the initial translation work of his version. This version corresponds overall in content to the "six fascicle" version and the Tibetan version.

Many scholars doubt the Indian provenance of the extra material found in the northern edition (the content beyond the first ten fascicles). The chief reasons for this skepticism are the following:

- No traces of an extended Sanskrit text has ever been found. Sanskrit manuscript fragments of twenty four separate pages distributed right across the core portion of the Mahāparinirvāṇa-sūtra have been found over the past hundred years in various parts of Asia; Likewise, there are no quotations from this latter portion in any Indian commentaries or sutra anthologies.
- No other translator in China or Tibet ever found Sanskrit copies of this portion. The Chinese monk-translator Yijing traveled to India and searched for this material but only found manuscripts corresponding to the core text. (Note: In his account of Eminent Monks who Went West in Search of the Dharma, 大唐西域求法高僧傳 T2066. He travelled widely through India and parts of Southeast Asia over a 25-year period.)

Some textual scholars argue the latter portion of the northern edition may have been a Central Asian composition, and some, even argue it may have been written by Dharmakṣema himself. However, other scholars like Jones and Granoff note that the latter portion knows of Indic texts which were unknown in China. Thus, Jones writes that there is "convincing evidence that this material is familiar with Indian literature unknown to any other Chinese materials that we know from Dharmakṣema’s time." Granoff notes for example, that the story of Ajatasatru in the latter portion of the Nirvana sutra draws on the Mahābhārata, suggesting an Indic origin. Furthermore, as Jones notes, both Chinese and Tibetan tradition understood the additional content as being of Indic origin.

One significant difference between the Dharmakṣema edition and the earlier six fascicle Nirvana sutra is that the six fascicle's view of icchantikas (heretics who cling to wrong views and reject the teachings of the Nirvana sutra) is much more negative and harsh. The Dharmakṣema translation of the Nirvana sutra seems to indicate that icchantikas can redeem themselves and eventually attain Buddhahood (since all beings have buddha-nature), while the six fascicle version seems to indicate that icchantikas are hopeless. This was famously a point of contention for the leading Chinese monk Daosheng (c. 360–434), who rejected the Faxian translation and was exiled, until he was vindicated when the new translation of Dharmakṣema was released.

There is also a secondary Chinese version the Dharmakṣema's translation, which was completed in 453 CE. This was produced "by polishing the style and adding new section headings" according to Stephen Hodge.

==== The "southern" edition ====
The "Southern text" (Taisho no. 375.12.605-852), in 36 fascicles, was edited c. 453 by Huiguan and Huiyan during the Liu Song dynasty. This edition integrates and amends the translations of the six fascicle text and Dharmakṣema's into a single edition of thirty-six fascicles. This edition changes the chapter divisions of the first part of the Dharmakṣema to match the six fascicle version and it also changes the language, Chinese characters and syntax to a more accessible and readable.

=== Tibetan editions ===
In the 6th section of the Tibetan Kangyur collection (vols. 77-78) there are three translations of the Nirvana sutra:

- Toh 120, the first "short" translation of the sūtra, in 3. 900 ślokas (13 scrolls). It was made in the early 9th century by Jinamitra, Dhyānagarbha and Ban de btsan dra. It is titled: ཡོངས་སུ་མྱ་ངན་ལས་འདས་པ་ཆེན་པོ་ཐེག་པ་ཆེན་པོའི་མདོ།, Phags pa yong su Mya ngan las 'Das pa chen po theg pa chen po'i mdo.
- Toh 119 - a translation from Chinese into Tibetan of the version of Dharmakṣema by Wang-phab-zhun, Dge-ba'i blos-gros and Rgya-mtsho'i sde in 56 scrolls, with the title ཡོངས་སུ་མྱ་ངན་ལས་འདས་པ་ཆེན་པོའི་མདོ།, Phags pa yongs su mya ngan las 'das pa chen po'i mdo.
- Toh 121 which preserves 16 verses translated by Kamalagupta and Rin Chen Bzang Po titled ཡོངས་སུ་མྱ་ངན་ལས་འདས་པའི་མདོ།, Phags pa yongs su mya ngan las 'das pa'i mdo.

=== English translations ===
- Yamamoto, Kosho, trans. (1973-1975). The Mahayana Mahaparinirvana Sutra, 3 Volumes, Karinbunko, Ube City, Japan. (Note: Qualified by Stephen Hodge as a "sadly unreliable, though pioneering, attempt".) A limited run of 500 copies. This is actually a translation from Shimajiʼs Kokuyaku issai kyō, a classic Japanese translation of the Southern version, rather than a direct translation from Dharmakṣema's Chinese.
- Blum, Mark, trans. (2013). The Nirvana Sutra: Volume 1 (of a projected 4), Berkeley, Calif.: BDK America (distr.: Honolulu: University of Hawai'i Press). ISBN 978-1-886439-46-7.
- Yamamoto, Kosho; Page, Tony. (2015). Nirvana Sutra: A Translation of Dharmakshema's Northern version, CreateSpace Independent Publishing Platform. ISBN 978-1-5176-3172-7. This is Dr. Tony Page's re-editing of Yamamoto's original.

=== Related sutras ===
There are several associated texts which are considered to be part of the Nirvana sutra "family". These are found in the "Nirvana" section (涅槃部) in the Chinese Buddhist canon. It includes:

1. Dabanniepan jing houfen (The Latter Portion of the Mahāparinirvāṇa sūtra, 大般涅槃經後分, Taisho no. 377) translated by Tang dynasty monk Huining and the Indian monk *Jñānabhadra (若那跋陀羅) in Heling. This is purported to be an even further missing part of the Nirvana sutra. Dharmakṣemaʼs biography records a comment by Tanwufa mentioning a missing portion, and some biographies mention that Dharmakṣema died while on his way back to India (or Central Asia) to search for the missing parts of the sutra.
2. Si tongzi sanmei jing (四童子三昧經 Taisho no. 379, Sanskrit: Caturdhārakasamādhi sūtra), translated by Jñānagupta in the Sui dynasty. Its setting is also the Buddha's final nirvana, though it has Ananda as the main interlocutor. It also teaches that the Buddha is eternally embodied in the dharmakaya and is always preaching the Dharma.
3. Fangdeng bannihuan jing (方等般泥洹經 Taisho no. 378, Sanskrit: Caturdhārakasamādhi sūtra), translated by Dharmarakṣa. The first six chapters are similar to Taisho no. 379, while the rest of the text focuses on Śākyamuniʼs buddhafield and the Buddha's parinirvāṇa.
4. Fo chui banniepan lüe shuo jiao jie jing (佛垂般涅槃略說教誡經 Taisho no. 389), also known as Yi jiao jing (遺教經), translated by Kumārajīva. It also describes the final nirvana and teaches that the Buddha is eternal.

=== Commentaries ===
Numerous commentaries on the Nirvana sutra were written in China. The most important Chinese commentary on the Nirvana sutra is the Compendium of Commentaries on the *Mahāparinirvāṇa-sūtra (Dabanniepanjing ji jie, 大般涅槃經集解 T 1763), compiled in 509 by Baoliang (寶亮) in the Liang dynasty. This is a compilation of comments by numerous masters on the Nirvana sutra. It includes comments by Emperor Wu of the Liang, Daosheng, Sengliang, Falue, Tanji, Sengzong, Baoliang, Zhixiu, Fazhi, Faan, Tanzhun, Falang, Tan'ai, Tanqian, Mingjun, Daohui, Falian and Jiaoyi.

Another important commentary was the Nirvana school scholar Pao-liang's (d. 509) On the Middle Path Buddha-nature. Pao-liang interprets the buddha-nature as the innately pure mind which is "the mysterious essence of divine illumination". According to Pao-liang, "there is not one split second in which this liberating essence is not functioning (to deliver the person from ignorance)" and he also says that this "liberating function" is the same as the natural tendency to avoid pain and seek bliss. Pao-liang also says that buddha nature is both in the skandhas and transcends them, being the unity of the two truths and the unity of samsara and nirvana.

Other Chinese commentaries in the Taisho Tripitaka include:

- Taisho no. 1764, Da Ban Niepan Jing Yi Ji 《大般涅槃經義記》by the Dilun scholar Hui Yuan (慧遠 523–592) in the Sui in 10 fascicles
- Taisho no. 1765, Da Ban Niepan Jing Xuan Yi《大般涅槃經玄義》by Tiantai monk Guanding in the Sui in 2 fascicles
- Taisho no. 1767, Da Ban Niepan Jing Shu《大般涅槃經疏》by Guanding in the Sui in 33 fascicles
- Taisho no. 1768, Da Ban Niepan Jing You Yi《涅槃經遊意》by Ji Zang in the Sui in 1 fascicle
- Taisho no. 1769, Niepan Zong Yao《涅槃宗要》by Wŏnhyo in the Silla in 1 fascicle
- Taisho no. 1766, Niepan Xuan Yi Fa Yuan Ji Yao《涅槃玄義發源機要》by the Tiantai master Zhi Yuan (976-1022 C.E.) in the Song in 4 fascicles.

== See also ==
- Anunatva-Apurnatva-Nirdesa
- Ātman (Buddhism)
- Dolpopa Sherab Gyaltsen
- Faith in Buddhism
- God in Buddhism
- Kulayarāja Tantra
- Parinirvana
- Mahāyāna sūtras
- Nirvana (Buddhism)
- Shinjō Itō, founder of the Shinnyo-en school of Buddhism
- Śrīmālādevī Siṃhanāda Sūtra
- Buddha-nature
- Tathāgatagarbha Sūtra

== Sources ==
- Blum, Mark L. (2013), The Nirvana Sutra, Vol. 1 (PDF), BDK America, archived from the original (PDF) on 2020-03-09
- Chen, Jinhua (2004), The Indian Buddhist Missionary Dharmakṣema (385-433): A New dating of his Arrival in Guzang and of his Translations, T'oung Pao 90, 215–263
- Gethin, Rupert (1998), Foundations of Buddhism, Oxford University Press
- Hodge, Stephen (2004), Textual History of the Mahāyāna-mahāparinirvāna-sūtra, archived from the original on June 22, 2009
- Hodge, Stephen (2006), On the Eschatology of the Mahaparinirvana Sutra and Related Matters (lecture delivered at the University of London, SOAS) (PDF), archived from the original (PDF) on June 14, 2013
- Hodge, Stephen (2012), The Mahayana Mahaparinirvana Sutra. The text & its Transmission (PDF), archived from the original (PDF) on December 19, 2013 Corrected and revised version of a paper presented in July 2010 at the Second International Workshop on the Mahaparinirvana Sutra held at LMU Munich.
- Jikido, Takasaki (2000), "The Tathagatagarbha Theory Reconsidered. Reflections on Some Recent Issues in Japanese Buddhist Studies", Japanese Journal of Religious Studies, 27 (1–2): 73–83, archived from the original on July 27, 2014
- Jones, C.V. (2020), The Buddhist Self: On Tathāgatagarbha and Ātman, University of Hawaii Press
- King, Sallie B. (1991), Buddha Nature, SUNY Press
- Liu, Ming-Wood (1982), "The Doctrine of the Buddha-Nature in the Mahāyāna Mahāparinirvāṇa Sūtra.", Journal of the International Association of Buddhist Studies, 5 (2): 63–94, archived from the original on October 16, 2013
- Liu, Ming-Wood (1984), "The Problem of the Icchantica in the Mahāyāna Mahāparinirvāṇa Sūtra", Journal of the International Association of Buddhist Studies, 7 (1): 57–82
- Liu, Ming-Wood (2005), "The Doctrine of Buddha-nature in the Mahayana Mahaparinirvana Sutra", Buddhism: Critical Concepts in Religious Studies (Vol. V), Paul Williams, Taylor & Francis, p. 190
- Matsuda, Kazunobu (1988). "Sanskrit Fragments of the Mahāyāna Mahāparinivāṇa-sūtra. A Study of the Central Asian Documents of the Stein/Hoernle Collection of the India Office Library". Studia Tibetica. 14.
- Radich, Michael (2015), The Mahāparinivāṇa-mahasūtra and the Emergence of Tathagatagarba Doctrine (Hamburg Buddhist Studies Vol. 5), Hamburg University Press
- Sasaki, Shizuka (1999), "Review Article: The Mahaparinirvana Sutra and the Origins of Mahayana Buddhism" (PDF), Japanese Journal of Religious Studies, 26 (1–2): 189–197, archived from the original (PDF) on August 11, 2011
- Shimoda, Masahiro (1997). A Study of the Mahāparinivāṇasūtra ~ with a Focus on the Methodology of the Study of Mahāyāna Sūtras. Tokyo, Shunjū-sha. (in Japanese)
- Williams, Paul (2002), Buddhist Thought, Taylor & Francis, Kindle Edition
- Yamamoto, Kosho (1975), Mahayanism: A Critical Exposition of the Mahayana Mahaparinirvana Sutra, Karinbunko
