= Daosheng =

Chinese Buddhist scholar (c. 360–434)

Daosheng (Chinese: 道生; pinyin: Dàoshēng; Wade–Giles: Tao Sheng; c. 360–434), or Zhu Daosheng (Chinese: 竺道生; Wade–Giles: Chu Tao-sheng), was an eminent Six Dynasties era Chinese Buddhist scholar. He is known for advocating the concepts of sudden enlightenment and the universality of the Buddha nature.

== Life ==
Born in Pengcheng, Daosheng left home to become a monk at eleven. He studied in Jiankang under Zhu Fatai, and later at Lushan (Mount Lu) monastery with Huiyuan, and from 405 or 406 under Kumarajiva in Chang'an, where he stayed for some two years perfecting his education. He became one of the foremost scholars of his time, counted among the "fifteen great disciples" of Kumarajiva.

Sengzhao reports that Daosheng assisted Kumarajiva in his translation of the Lotus Sutra, Daosheng wrote commentaries on the Lotus Sutra, the Vimalakirti-nirdesa Sutra and the Astasahasrika-prajnaparamita Sutra (the last of which has been lost). In 408, he returned to Lushan, and in 409 back to Jiankang, where he remained for some twenty years, staying at the Qingyuan Monastery (青园寺) from 419.

== Teachings ==
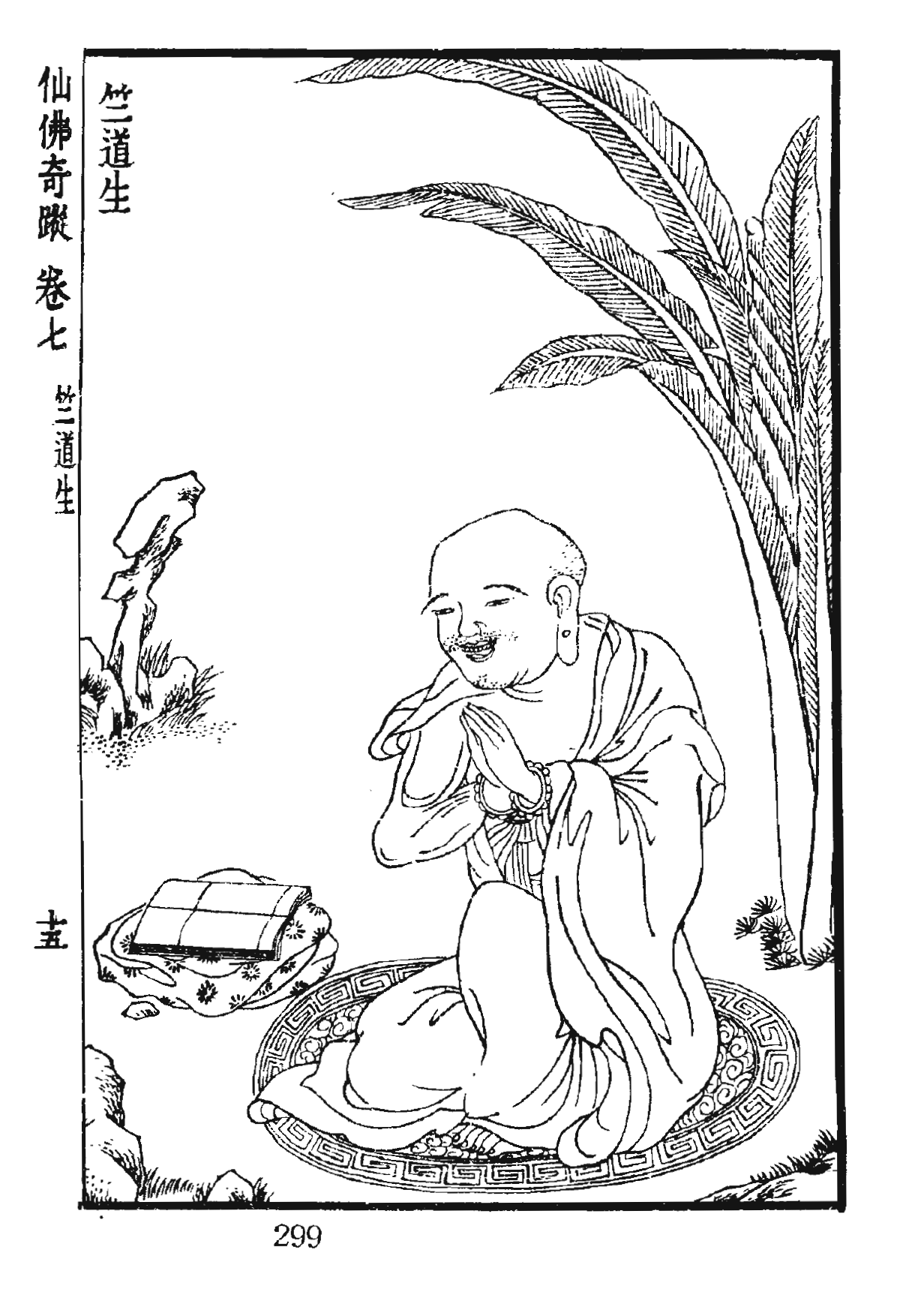
Daosheng

Daosheng controversially ascribed Buddha-nature to the icchantikas, based on his reading on a short version of the Mahaparinirvana Sutra, which in that short form appears to deny the Buddha-nature to icchantikas; the long version of the Nirvana Sutra, however (not yet known to Daosheng), explicitly includes the icchantikas in the universality of the Buddha-nature. Daosheng's bold doctrine of including icchantikas within the purview of the Buddha-nature, even before that explicit teaching had actually been found in the long Nirvana Sutra, led to the expulsion of Daosheng from the Buddhist community in 428 or 429, and he retreated to Lushan in 430.

With the availability of the long Nirvana Sutra after 430, through the translation of Dharmakshema, Daosheng was vindicated and praised for his insight. He remained in Lushan, composing his commentary on the Lotus Sutra in 432, until his death in 434.

Daosheng's exegesis of the Nirvana Sutra had an enormous influence on interpretations of the Buddha-nature in Chinese Buddhism that prepared the ground for the Chan school emerging in the 6th century.

== Sources ==
- Blum, Mark (2003). "Daosheng". In Buswell, Robert E. (ed.). Encyclopedia of Buddhism. New York: Macmillan Reference Lib. pp. 201–202. ISBN 0028657187.
- Buswell, Robert Jr; Lopez, Donald S. Jr., eds. (2013). Princeton Dictionary of Buddhism. Princeton, NJ: Princeton University Press. ISBN 9780691157863.
- Hsiang-Kuang, Chou (1956). A History of Chinese Buddhism. Allahabad: Indo-Chinese Literature Publications.
- Kanno, Hiroshi (1994). "An Overview of Research on Chinese Commentaries of the Lotus Sutra". Acta Asiatica. 66: 87–103.
- Kim, Young-Ho (1985). Tao-Sheng's Commentary on the Lotus Sutra: A Study and Translation. dissertation, Albany, NY.: McMaster University. Archived from the original on 2014-02-03.
- Kim, Young-ho (1992). Tao-Sheng's Commentary on the Lotus Sutra: A Study and Translation. SUNY Press. ISBN 978-1-4384-0898-9.
- Lai, Whalen (1982). "Sinitic speculations on buddha-nature". Philosophy East and West. 32 (2): 135–149. doi:10.2307/1398712. JSTOR 1398712.
- Lai, Whalen (1991). "Tao Sheng's Theory of Sudden Enlightenment Re-examined". In Peter N. Gregory (ed.). Sudden and Gradual. Approaches to Enlightenment in Chinese Thought. Delhi: Motilal Banarsidass Publishers Private Limited. pp. 169–200.
- Tanabe, George J. (1992). "Review: Tao-sheng's Commentary on the Lotus Sutra: A Study and Translation, by Young-he Kim". Philosophy East and West. 42 (2): 351–355. doi:10.2307/1399301. JSTOR 1399301. Archived from the original on August 17, 2011.

== Bibliography ==
- Lai, Whalen W. (1982). "The Mahaparinirvana-Sutra and its earliest interpreters in China: two prefaces by Tao-lang and Tao-sheng". Journal of the American Oriental Society. 102 (1): 99–105. doi:10.2307/601115. JSTOR 601115.
- Liebenthal, Walter (1955). A Biography of Chu Tao-Sheng, Monumenta Nipponica 11 (3), 284-316
- Shi Huijiao, Yang, Tianshu, transl. Ross, Edward A. S. editor (2022). 'The Biographies of Eminent Monks'. Hong Kong: Centre of Buddhist Studies, University of Hong Kong. pp. 284-289, ISBN 978-988-76424-2-8
