= Buddhabhadra (translator) =

Indian Buddhist monk who translated Buddhist texts from Sanskrit into Chinese

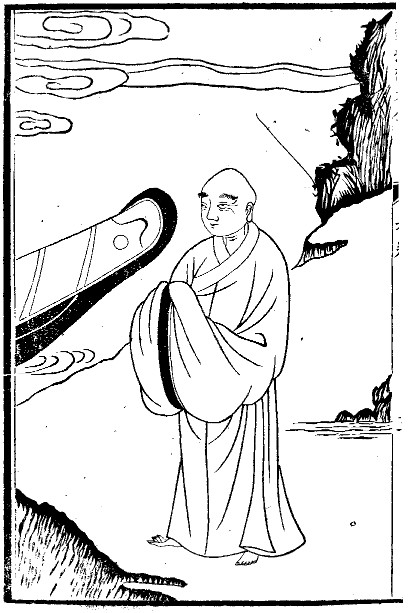
Buddhabhadra

Buddhabhadra (simplified Chinese: 佛陀跋陀罗; traditional Chinese: 佛陀跋陀羅; pinyin: Fótuóbátuóluó) (359-429 CE) was a Mahayana Buddhist meditation and Vinaya master. He is most known for his prolific translation efforts of Buddhist texts from Sanskrit into Chinese, and was responsible for the first Chinese translation of the Avataṃsaka Sūtra (Flower Ornament Scripture) in the 5th century. In China, he was popularly known as the "Meditation Master from India" (Tiānzhú chánshī 天竺禪師).

== Overview ==
Buddhabhadra was a descendant of the Śākya clan born in Nagarahāra (Ch. Nàhēlìchéng 那呵利城, modern Jalal-Ābād in Afghanistan), which was a famous center of Sarvastivada at the time. Buddhabhadra was a student of the Kashmiri meditation master Buddhasena, who was a Mahayanist and a Sarvastivadin. Buddhabhadra became a master of discipline (Vinaya) and meditation. He had a Chinese student, Jibin Zhiyan (350-427) who invited him to travel to China. On arriving in the Chinese Later Qin capital of Chang'an in 406–8, Buddhabhadra befriended Kumārajīva and took part in a public debate with him promoted by the Prince Hong which is recorded in Chinese sources. Buddhabhadra soon became famous as a meditation master. Kumārajīva’s group and Buddhabhadra's group eventually developed a rivalry which eventually led to Buddhabhadra being expelled from Chang’an (c. 410).

While staying at Mount Lu (廬山), Buddhabhadra translated some meditation manuals at the behest of the monk Huiyuan. These are the Dharmatrātadhyāna Sutra (Dámódúolúo chánjīng 達磨多羅禪經, T618, possibly originally titled *Yogācārabhūmi Sūtra) a "dhyana sutra", and the Sutra on the Ocean-Like Samādhi of the Visualization of the Buddha (Guānfó sānmèi hǎi jīng, 觀佛三昧海經 T 643), which focuses on Buddha contemplation.

After his stay at Mount Lu, Buddhabhadra and his disciples moved to Daochang Monastery (道場寺) where Buddhabhadra continued teaching meditation, becoming known as a famous meditation master and teacher. Soon they were joined by Faxian. It is here that Buddhabhadra and his team or cohort (consisting of Chinese disciples such as Baoyun, Huiguan, Zhiyan) along with Faxian, translated most of the scriptures attributed to Buddhabhadra.

Buddhabhadra and his team translated the large 60 fascicle Avataṃsaka-sūtra (T 278). Buddhabhadra and his team also produced translations of the Mahāsāṃghika-vinaya (T 1425), the Mahāparinirvāṇa-sūtra (T 376, translated together with Faxian), Tathāgatagarbha sūtra (T 666) and the Larger Sukhāvatīvyūha (T 360).

== Influence ==
Buddhabhadra's work was profoundly influential on later Chinese Buddhism. His meditation manuals and his disciples (Zhiyan, Huiguan, Baoyun, Xuangao, and Tanyao) influenced the practice of Chinese Buddhist meditation, and the popularity of the construction of grotto meditation cave-temples such as the Yungang Grottoes, Maijishan Grottoes and the Bingling Temple Grottoes. His translation of the Avataṃsaka-sūtra also influenced the development of the early Avataṃsaka exegetical tradition which would in time develop into Huayan Buddhism, while his Larger Sukhāvatīvyūha likewise influenced the development of Pure Land Buddhism.

Buddhabhadra's protégé Xuangao (玄高, c. ?-444) was an important meditation master in the northern Liang of the Sixteen States era who focused on Buddha visualization practices and on the practice of the "Huayan Samadhi". This tradition of Xuangao (centered around the Binglingsi cave) has been seen by scholars like Imre Hamar as a precursor to the Huayan school proper. Furthermore, Hamar theorizes that Xuangao along with the master Daorong cooperated to compose the apocryphal sutras Brahma's Net Sūtra (Fanwang Jing T1484) and the Sutra of the Original Acts that Adorn the Bodhisattva (Pusa yingluo benye jing T1485) which stand at the beginning of the development of the Huayan tradition.

The meditation texts of Buddhabhadra also influenced Chan Buddhism, and some of their methods were criticized by later sources like Shenhui and the authors of the Lidai fabao ji.

== See also ==
- Silk Road transmission of Buddhism
- Bodhidharma
- Lotsawa
