= Dharmarakṣa =

3rd-century Chinese Buddhist translator

Chinese name
- Traditional Chinese: 竺法護
- Simplified Chinese: 竺法护
Transcriptions
Standard Mandarin
- Hanyu Pinyin: Zhú Fǎhù

Korean name
- Hangul: 축법호
- Hanja: 竺法護
Transcriptions
- Revised Romanization: Chuk Beopho
- McCune–Reischauer: Ch'uk Pŏpho

Japanese name
- Kanji: 竺法護
- Kana: じく ほうご
Transcriptions
- Romanization: Jiku Hōgo

Dharmarakṣa (Chinese: 竺法護; pinyin: Zhú Fǎhù; J. Jiku Hōgo; K. Ch'uk Pŏpho; c. 233–310) was one of the most important early translators of Mahayana sutras into Chinese. Several of his translations had profound effects on East Asian Buddhism. He is described in scriptural catalogues as Yuezhi in origin.

== Life ==
His family lived at Dunhuang, where he was born around 233 CE. At the age of eight, he became a novice and took the Indian monk named Zhu Gaozuo (Chinese: 竺高座) as his teacher.

As a young boy, Dhamaraksa was said to be extremely intelligent, and journeyed with his teacher to many countries in the Western Regions, where he learned Central Asian languages and scripts. He then traveled back to China with a quantity of Buddhist texts and translated them with the aid of numerous assistants and associates, both Chinese and foreign, from Parthians to Khotanese. One of his more prominent assistants was a Chinese upāsaka, Nie Chengyuan (Chinese: 聶承遠), who served as a scribe and editor.

Dharmaraksa first began his translation career in Chang'an (present day Xi'an) in 266 CE, and later moved to Luoyang, the capital of the newly formed Jin Dynasty. He was active in Dunhuang for some time as well, and alternated between the three locations. It was in Chang'an that he made the first known translation of the Lotus Sutra and the Ten Stages Sutra, two texts that later became definitive for Chinese Buddhism, in 286 and 302, respectively. He died at the age of seventy-eight after a period of illness; the exact location of his death is still disputed.

== Works ==
Altogether, Dharmaraksa translated around 154 sūtras. Many of his works were greatly successful, widely circulating around northern China in the third century and becoming the subject of exegetical studies and scrutiny by Chinese monastics in the fourth century. His efforts in both translation and lecturing on sūtras are said to have converted many in China to Buddhism, and contributed to the development of Chang'an into a major center of Buddhism at the time.

Some of his main translations are:

- Saddharmapundarika Sūtra (Chinese: 正法華經; pinyin: Zhèng Fǎhuá Jīng), the "Lotus Sutra"
- Pañcaviṃśatisāhasrikā Prajñāpāramitā Sūtra (The Perfection of Wisdom Sutra in 25,000 Lines, Chinese: 光贊般若波羅密經; pinyin: Guāngzàn Bōrě Bōluómì jīng)
- The Dasabhūmika-sūtra (Ten Stages Sutra, Chinese: 漸備一切智德經; pinyin: Jiànbèi Yīqiè Zhìdé Jīng)
- The Lalitavistara Sūtra (Chinese: 普曜經; pinyin: Pǔyào Jīng)
- The Vimalakīrtinirdeśa
- The Tathāgataguhyaka Sūtra (Secrets of the Tathāgata)
- The Bhadrakalpikasūtra
- The Śūraṅgama Samādhi Sūtra
- Akṣayamatinirdeśa

== See also ==
- Lokaksema (Buddhist monk)
- History of Buddhism
- Silk Road transmission of Buddhism
- Dharmakṣema

== Bibliography ==
- Boucher, Daniel (2006). Dharmaraksa and the Transmission of Buddhism to China, Asia Major 19, 13-37
- Boucher, Daniel. Buddhist Translation Procedures in Third-Century China: A Study of Dharmaraksa and His Translation Idiom. Ann Arbor, MI: UMI Microform. 1996. Print.
- Wood, Francis. The Silk Road: Two Thousand Years in the Heart of Asia. Berkeley, CA: University of California Press, 2002.
