= Dharmakṣema =

- Dharmakṣema depicted translating the Mahāmegha Sūtra

Personal life
- Born: c. 385 CE Magadha
- Died: c. 433 CE near Guzong

Religious life
- Religion: Buddhism

Dharmakṣema (धर्मक्षेम, transliterated 曇無讖 (pinyin: Tánmó-chèn), translated 竺法豐 (pinyin: Zhú Fǎfēng); 385–433 CE) was an Indian Buddhist monk, missionary and translator, active during the fifth century CE who was responsible for a number of important translation projects while travelling in China.

He had been residing in Dunhuang for several years when that city was captured in 420 by Juqu Mengxun, the king of Northern Liang. Under the patronage of Mengxun, Dharmakṣema took up residence in Guzang, the Northern Liang capital in 421. As well as being a valued political adviser to Mengxun, he went on to become one of the most prolific translators of Buddhist literature into Chinese. The colophons to translated texts attributed to Dharmakṣema indicate that he was one of the few Indian scholar-monks active in China who was sufficiently proficient in spoken Chinese to make the preliminary oral translations of Buddhist texts himself without an interpreter, although the further stages in the production of the translations were done by his team of Chinese assistants. He was assassinated on the orders of his erstwhile patron Mengxun, for quasi-political reasons, on another journey to the West in 433.

== Biography ==
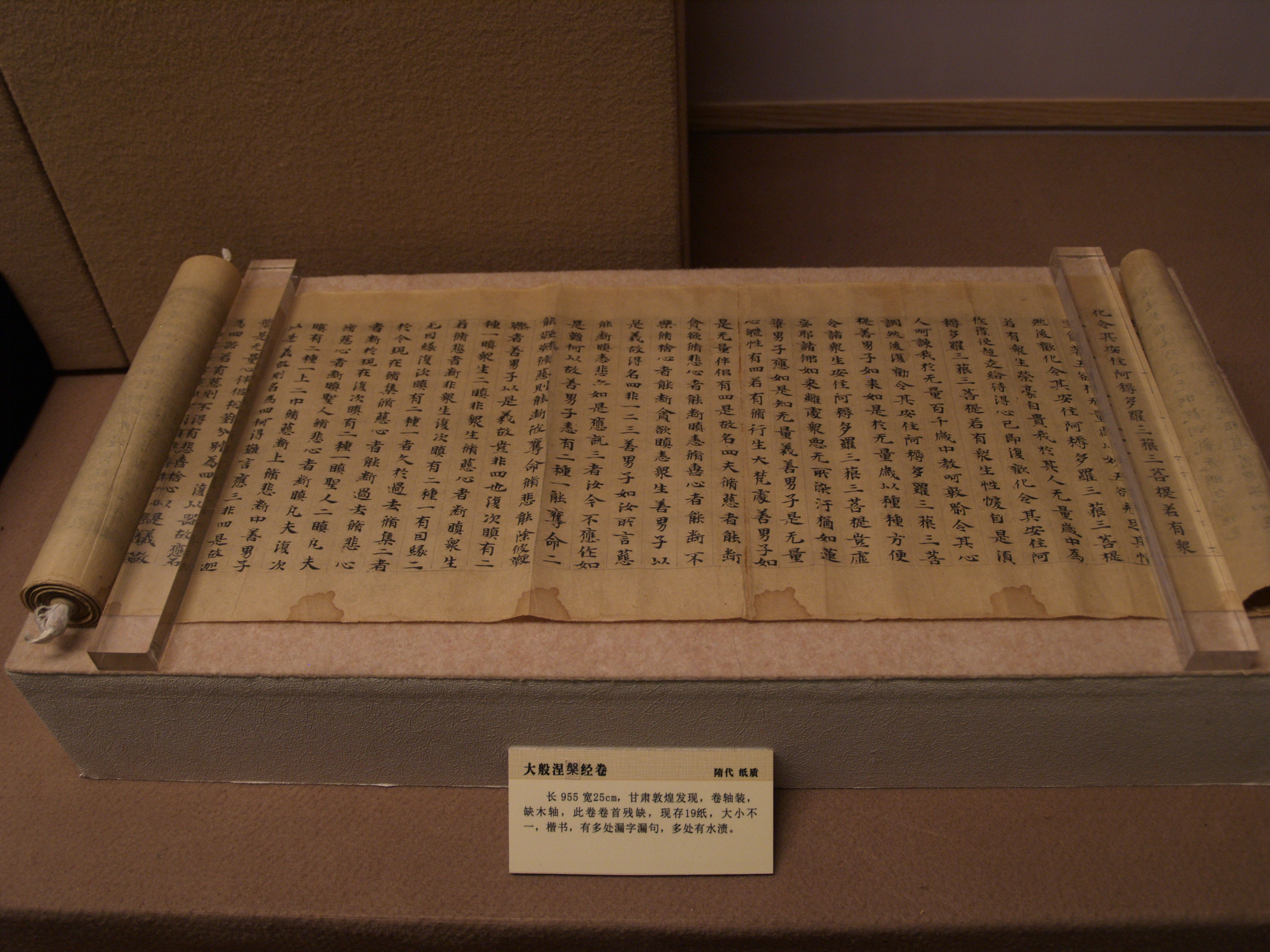
A Sui dynasty manuscript of the Nirvāṇa Sūtra of which Dharmaksema was involved in the translation into Mandarin

=== Life in India ===
Based on canonical catalogues and biographies such as Sengyou's Chu Sanzang Jiji (出三藏記集) and the Wei Annals, it has been possible to reconstruct an outline of Dharmakṣema's life and career. Kṣema in his name means ‘peace and security’.

Dharmakṣema originated from a Brahmin family in Central India. This has been identified specifically with the Magadha region in some sources. When he was six years old, Dharmakṣema lost his father. His mother supported the family as a weaver of fine woollen cloth. One day a popular and wealthy monk, Dharmayaśas, was in the area. Impressed by his prosperity, Dharmakṣema's mother had the young boy of ten taken on as a pupil. Throughout his youth, Dharmakṣema studied the Hīnayāna scriptures and showed great promise as he was gifted with considerable powers of memory and eloquence. On the other hand, he seems to have taken an early interest in the use of magic and spells, competing with other boys in challenges.

Later he is said to have met an old meditation master, known only as "White Head", who worsted Dharmakṣema in a debate that lasted ten days. He was given a copy of the Nirvāṇa Sūtra by the old monk and this is reported to have been the trigger of his conversion to Mahāyāna. He then studied Mahāyāna and by the age of twenty, he is said to have memorized a phenomenal amount of scripture.

His younger brother accidentally killed the favourite elephant of the local king and was executed for this. Though the king had forbidden anybody to mourn or bury the corpse on pain of death, Dharmkṣema defied this order and buried the body of his brother. After he had been interrogated by the king about his disobedience, the king was impressed by Dharmakṣema's audacity and took him on as a court chaplain. All the surviving biographies suggest that Dharmakṣema maintained his position there for a while using a combination of flattery and magical tricks. Eventually, according to the biographies report, this king grew tired of Dharmakṣema, forcing Dharmakṣema to resort to unscrupulous magic and blackmail in an attempt to retain his court position. When his trickery came to light, he fled to Central Asia taking with him the copy of the Nirvāṇa Sūtra and two other texts on moral discipline.

=== Travels in China ===
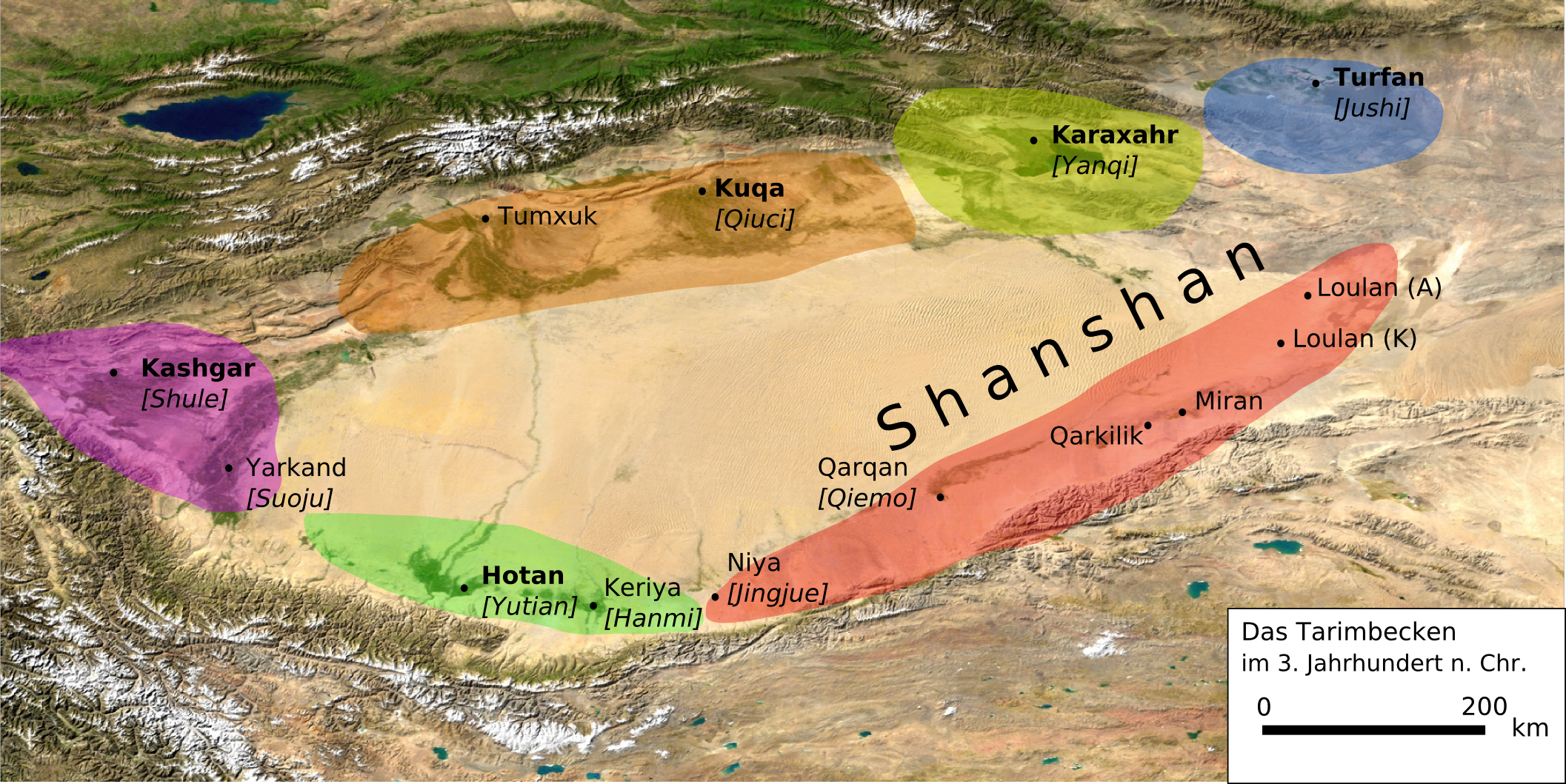
Map of the Tarim Basin with Kucha in the north

After a brief stay in Kucha and possibly Shanshan, Dharmakṣema arrived in Dunhuang where he may have stayed for several years and possibly did some early translation work. It is reported that his fame as a thaumaturge followed him across Central Asia. An anecdote, mentioned in the monastic biographies, dating to this period shows a somewhat less than respectful attitude towards the Nirvāṇa Sūtra, even though the account presumably comes from Dharmakṣema himself. He was staying at an inn and decided to use the text as a pillow. Each night for the following three nights, a voice was heard coming from the ground asking why he was using the sacred word of the Buddha as a pillow. He eventually placed the book high on a shelf and the voice stopped calling out to him.

While he was in Dunhuang, that city was subdued in 420 and again in 421 by the Northern Liang king, Juqu Mengxun. It is probable that Juqu had already heard about Dharmakṣema since the biographical records imply that Juqu sought him and installed him in the palace temple in Guzong, the Northern Liang capital, by 421. Almost immediately, Dharmakṣema was put to work translating the Nirvāṇa Sūtra by Juqu who may have been interested in the prophecies contained in that text concerning the "end-days" of the Dharma. The ten juan (scroll) translation that Dharmakṣema produced at that time seems to have been based on the manuscript that he had brought with him, corresponding to the six juan version, normally attributed to Faxian, but actually translated by Buddhabhadra and Baoyuan a few years earlier. Following the Nirvāṇa Sūtra, Dharmakṣema went on to translate the remainder of the corpus of texts attributed to him.

Throughout this period, Dharmakṣema seems to have consolidated his position both as imperial chaplain and court adviser. Juqu seems to have valued his reported prophetic abilities, which were regarded as infallible by his contemporaries. He also continued to use his magical or thaumaturgic skills to retain Juqu's reliance upon him, reportedly exorcising the city of a host of plague-bearing demons.

By the mid-420s, the emperor of the neighbouring state of Wei, Tuoba Tao, had heard of Dharmakṣema's magical and prophetic abilities, and, as Juqu's superior, demanded that Dharmakṣema be handed over to him. It is reported that Juqu was very reluctant to do so as Dharmakṣema was a valued asset to his Northern Liang state.

Coincidentally, around this time Dharmakṣema is said to have suddenly discovered that the version of the Nirvāṇa Sūtra he had earlier translated was incomplete, asserting that the full version should cover at least 25,000 or even 35,000 verses—as opposed to the 5000 verses he had already translated. Dharmakṣema was given permission to go in search of the missing portions and may have travelled back to North Western India for this purpose. After an absence of more than two years, he then returned to Guzang, bringing extra-textual material with him which he claimed he had found in Khotan. It is possible that Dharmakṣema himself was the author of this material, as he had both the scriptural training and the motive to do this.

Whatever the truth of the matter, Dharmakṣema stayed on in Guzang. He then translated this new material, together with still further material purportedly belonging to the extended Nirvāṇa Sūtra, which had been handed to him by an anonymous visiting foreign monk, "as if it were expected" as the biographies note with apparent incredulity. This renewed work resulted in the current version of forty juan found in the Chinese canon.

After negotiations had dragged on for several years, the pressure from Tuoba Tao became impossible to ignore—he was even threatening to invade Northern Liang to take Dharmakṣema by force. In the late months of 432, a decision to kill Dharmakṣema was reached by Juqu Mengxun and Li Shun, the aristocratic emissary of Tuoba Tao. The reasons for this decision are unclear as two differing accounts are found in the monastic biographies and the civil Wei Annals, though the two sources concur that he was killed in January 433 at the age of forty-nine. The monastic biographical records state that Dharmakṣema had insisted on leaving Guzong for another trip in search of further missing parts of the Nirvāṇa Sūtra. Juqu thought that Dharmakṣema might be planning to defect to another ruler and did not want to lose his talents. He therefore sent assassins after Dharmakṣema who killed him on the road some 40 li from Guzong. The Wei Annals present a different story. They record that Dharmakṣema was particularly famed for secret sexual techniques, which had interested Tuoba Tao, which had already got him into trouble in Shanshan with female members of the royal family there. At their meeting in 432, Li Shun revealed to Juqu that Dharmakṣema had been giving lessons in special sexual techniques in secret to ladies of the Northern Liang court, including members of Juqu's own family. Juqu Mengxun was outraged by this revelation and had Dharmakṣema tortured and publicly executed at the age of 49.

It is also recorded that Juqu regretted his actions and was plagued by visitations from demons "even in broad daylight" until his own death a few months later in March 433.

== Translations ==
The Chu sanzang ji ji (出三藏記集 Compilation of Notes on the Translation of the Tripitaka; or Collected Records concerning the Translation of the Tripiṭaka) lists 11 texts as Dharmakṣema’s translations:

- Da banniepan jing (大般涅槃經, the Great Nirvāṇa Sūtra), 36 fascicles, Taisho no. 374.
- Fangdeng daji jing (方等大集經, the Sūtra of the Vaipulya Great Assembly), 29 or 30 fascicles, Taisho no. 397.
- Fangdengwang xukongzang jing (方等王虚空藏經, the Sūtra of the King of Vaipulya and the Chamber of Space), 5 fascicles
- Fangdeng dayun jing (方等大雲經, Skt. Mahāmeghasūtra; the Sūtra of the Vaipulya Great Cloud), 4 fascicles (or Fangdeng wuxiang dayun jing, 方等無想大雲經, 6 fascicles), Taisho no. 387.
- Beihua jing (悲華經, the Sūtra of Flower with Compassion, Karuṇā-puṇḍarīka-sūtra), 10 fascicles, Taisho no. 157.
- Jinguangming jing (金光明經, the Golden Light Sūtra), 4 fascicles, Taisho no. 663.
- Hailongwang jing (海龍王經, the Sūtra of the King of Marine Dragons), 4 fascicles, Taisho no. 598.
- Pusa dichi jing (菩薩地持經, the Sūtra of Stages of Bodhisattvas], 8 fascicles, Taisho no. 1581.
- Pusajie ben (菩薩戒本, the Text on Precepts of Bodhisattvas), 1 fascicle (also regarded as a text translated in Dunhuang), Taisho no. 1500.
- Youposai jie (優婆塞戒, Upasaka’s Precepts), 7 fascicles, Taisho no. 1488.
- Pusajie jing (菩薩戒經, the Sūtra of Precepts of Bodhisattvas), 8 fascicles.
- Pusajie youpo jietan wen (菩薩戒優婆戒壇文, Treatise on Precepts of Bodhisattvas and Upasakas), 1 fascicle.

== See also ==
- Dharmaraksha
- Tao Sheng
- Silk Road transmission of Buddhism
- Northern Liang
- Tuoba Tao
- Juqu Mengxun
