= Tathāgatagarbha Sūtra =

Sutra in Mahāyāna Buddhism

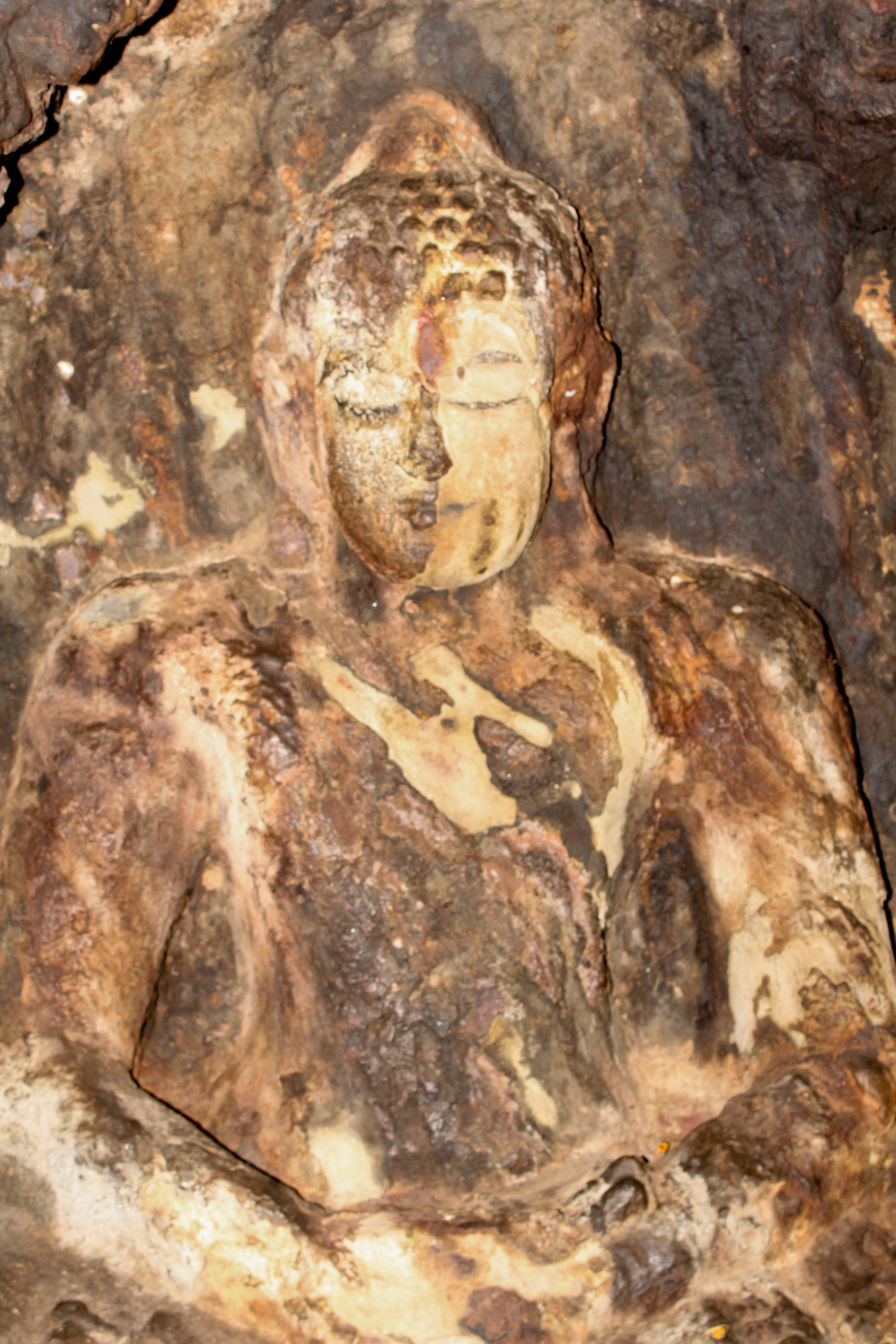
Statue of the Buddha at Bojjannakonda, Andhra Pradesh, India

The Tathāgatagarbha Sūtra is an influential and doctrinally striking Mahāyāna Buddhist scripture which treats of the existence of the "Tathāgatagarbha" (Buddha-Matrix, Buddha-Embryo, lit. "the womb of the thus-come-one") within all sentient creatures. According to the Buddha, all sentient beings are born with buddha-nature and have the potential to become a Buddha. Physical and mental defilements of everyday life act as clouds over this nature and usually prevent this realization. This nature is no less than the indwelling Buddha himself.

== History ==
=== Origins and development ===
Anthony Barber associates the development of the Tathāgatagarbha Sūtra with the Mahāsāṃghika sect of Buddhism, and concludes that the Mahāsāṃghikas of the Āndhra region (i.e. the Caitika schools) were responsible for the inception of the Tathāgatagarbha doctrine.

The Tathāgatagarbha Sūtra is considered "the earliest expression of this [the tathāgatagarbha doctrine] and the term tathāgatagarbha itself seems to have been coined in this very sutra." The text is no longer extant in its language of origin, but is preserved in two Tibetan and two Chinese translations.

=== Translations ===
Michael Zimmermann discerns two recensions, the shorter recension, translated into Chinese by Buddhabhadra in 420 CE, and the more extended and detailed recension, extant in the following translations:

- the Chinese translation of Amoghavajra (middle of 8th century);
- an apocryphal Tibetan translation from Bathang;
- the canonical Tibetan translation (around 800 CE).

Buddhabhadra's version was translated into English by Grosnick in 1995 and the Tibetan version was translated by Zimmermann in 2002.

== The nine similes ==
According to Zimmermann, the nine similes "embody the new and central message of the text, embedded in the more or less standard framework consisting of the setting, a passage expounding the merit of propagating the sutra and a story of the past." The simile (1) in the first chapter describes a fantastic scene with many buddhas seated in lotus calyxes in the sky, who are not affected by the withering of the flowers. The following eight similes illustrate how the indwelling Buddha in sentient beings is hidden by the negative mental states (kleśas),

comparing it to (2) honey protected by bees, (3) kernels enclosed by their husks, (4) a gold nugget in excrement, (5) a hidden treasure beneath the house, (6) a sprout in the seed becoming a huge tree, (7) a tathāgata image wrapped in rotten rags, (8) a cakravartin in the womb of a despised, orphan woman and (9) a golden figure within a burned clay mold.

== Doctrines ==
=== Overview ===
In regard to the Tathāgatagarbha Sūtra and the term Tathāgatagarbha, A. W. Barber writes:

... as Alex Wayman, Michael Zimmermann, and I have noted, the original meaning of the term was that one is "already" or primordially awakened. For example, the Tathagatagarbha sutra illuminates the matter metaphorically this way: "inside a casting mold there is perfectly formed Buddha; the ignorant see the filth of the mold but the wise know that the Buddha is within."

The Tathāgatagarbha Sūtra constitutes one of a number of Tathāgatagarbha or Buddha-nature sutras (including the Mahāyāna Mahāparinirvāṇa Sūtra, the Śrīmālādevī Siṃhanāda Sūtra, the Angulimaliya Sutra, and the Anunatva-Apurnatva-Nirdesa) which unequivocally declare the reality of an Awakened Essence within each being.

=== Tathāgatagarbha and ātman ===
According to some scholars, the Tathāgatagarbha does not represent a substantial self (ātman); rather, it is a positive language expression of emptiness (śūnyatā) and represents the potentiality to realize Buddhahood through Buddhist practices; the intention of the teaching of Tathāgatagarbha is Soteriology rather than theoretical. This interpretation is contentious. Not all scholars share this view. Michael Zimmermann, a specialist on the Tathāgatagarbha Sūtra, writes for instance: "the existence of an eternal, imperishable self, that is, buddhahood, is definitely the basic point of the Tathāgatagarbha Sutra.

Zimmermann also declares that the compilers of the Tathāgatagarbha Sūtra "did not hesitate to attribute an obviously substantialist notion to the buddha-nature of living beings," and notes the total lack of evident interest in this sutra for any ideas of "emptiness" (śūnyatā): "Throughout the whole Tathāgatagarbha Sūtra the term śūnyatā does not even appear once, nor does the general drift of the TGS somehow imply the notion of śūnyatā as its hidden foundation. On the contrary, the sutra uses very positive and substantialist terms to describe the nature of living beings.' Also, writing on the diverse understandings of Tathāgatagarbha doctrine, Jamie Hubbard comments on how some scholars see a tendency towards monism in the Tathāgatagarbha [a tendency which Japanese scholar Matsumoto castigates as non-Buddhist]. Hubbard comments:

Matsumoto [calls] attention to the similarity between the extremely positive language and causal structure of enlightenment found in the tathagatagarbha literature and that of the substantial monism found in the atman/Brahman tradition. Matsumoto, of course, is not the only one to have noted this resemblance. Takasaki Jikido, for example, the preeminent scholar of the tathagatagarbha tradition, sees monism in the doctrine of the tathagatagarbha and the Mahayana in general … Obermiller wedded this notion of a monistic Absolute to the tathagatagarbha literature in his translation and comments to the Ratnagotra, which he aptly subtitled “A Manual of Buddhist Monism” … Lamotte and Frauwallner have seen the tathagatagarbha doctrine as diametrically opposed to the Madhyamika and representing something akin to the monism of the atman/Brahman strain …

Dan Lusthaus, writing on the Yogācāra school, comments: "Many Tathāgatagarbha texts, in fact, argue for the acceptance of selfhood (ātman) as a sign of higher accomplishment."

Buddhahood is thus taught to be the timeless, virtue-filled Real (although as yet unrecognised as such by the deluded being), present inside the mind of every sentient being from the beginningless beginning. Its disclosure to direct perception, however, depends on inner spiritual purification and purgation of the superficial obscurations which conceal it from view.

== See also ==
- Brahman
- Dhammakaya Tradition
- Dolpopa Sherab Gyaltsen
- Hongaku
- Kulayarāja Tantra
- Luminous mind

== Sources ==
- "大方等如來藏經 第1卷" [Dafang Waiting For The Tathagata Canon Volume 1]. CBETA Electronic Buddhist Collection. Translated by Buddhabhadra.
- Grosnick, William H. (1995), The Tathāgatagarbha Sūtra (PDF), Princeton: In: Lopez, Donald S. Jr.; ed. Buddhism in Practice, Princeton University Press, archived from the original (PDF) on March 27, 2013
- Hubbard, Jamie (2001), Absolute Delusion, Perfect Buddhahood, Honolulu: University of Hawai’i Press
- King, Sallie B. (1997). The Doctrine of Buddha Nature is Impeccably Buddhist (PDF). In: Jamie Hubbard, Paul Swanson, Pruning the Bodhi Tree, the Storm over Critical Buddhism, Honolulu: University of Hawai’iPress. ISBN 0-8248-1908X. Archived from the original on 2009-02-25.
- Padma, Sree; Barber, Anthony W. (2008), Buddhism in the Krishna River Valley of Andhra, Albany: State University of New York Press, ISBN 978-0791474853
- Shih, Heng-Ching, The Significance Of 'Tathagatagarbha' -- A Positive Expression Of 'Sunyata, archived from the original on February 15, 2005
- Zimmermann, Michael (1999), The Tathagatagarbhasutra: Its Basic Structure and Relation to the Lotus Sutra (PDF), Annual Report of the International Research Institute for Advanced Buddhology at Soka University for the Academic Year 1998, pp. 143–168, archived from the original (PDF) on October 8, 2011
- Zimmermann, Michael (2002), A Buddha Within: The Tathāgatagarbhasūtra. Biblotheca Philologica et Philosophica Buddhica VI (PDF), Tokyo: The International Research Institute for Advanced Buddhology, Soka University, archived from the original (PDF) on November 11, 2013
