= Aṅgulimālīya Sūtra =

Mahāyāna Buddhist scripture

The Aṅgulimālīya Sūtra (Taishō 120) is a Mahāyāna Buddhist scripture belonging to the Tathāgatagarbha class of sūtra, which teach that the Buddha is eternal, that the non-Self and emptiness teachings only apply to the worldly sphere and not to Nirvāṇa, and that the Tathāgatagarbha is real and immanent within all beings and all phenomena. The sutra consists mostly of stanzas in verse.

The Mahāyāna Aṅgulimālīya Sūtra should not be confused with the Pāli Canon's Angulimala Sutta, which is a completely different work included in the Majjhima Nikaya.

== Origins and history ==
According to Stephen Hodge, internal textual evidence in the Aṅgulimālīya Sūtra, Mahābherihāraka Parivarta Sūtra, and the Mahāyāna Mahāparinirvāṇa Sūtra, indicates that these texts were first circulated in southern India, and they then gradually propagated up to the northwest, with Kashmir being the other major center. The Aṅgulimālīya Sūtra gives a more detailed account by mentioning the points of distribution as including southern India, the Vindhya Range, Bharukaccha, and Kashmir. Hodge summarizes his findings as follows:

[T]here are strong grounds based on textual evidence that the MPNS (Mahāyāna Mahāparinirvāṇa Sūtra), or a major portion of it, together with related texts were compiled in the Deccan during the second half of the 2nd century CE, in a Mahāsāṃghika environment, probably in one of their centres along the western coastal region such as Karli, or perhaps, though less likely, the Amaravati-Dhanyakaṭaka area.

In the 6th century CE, Paramārtha wrote that the Mahāsāṃghikas revere the sūtras which teach the Tathāgatagarbha.

== Central teachings ==
The Aṅgulimālīya Sūtra consists largely of teachings by Aṅgulimālīya on the correct understanding of Buddhist doctrine. According to Michael Radich,

The Aṅgulimālīyasūtra shares with the Mahāparinirvāṇamahāsūtra group tathāgatagarbha/buddha nature preached as explicitly connected with ātman (ātmadhātu [wojie(我界)]) and concealed by defilements, the eternity of the Tathāgata, the secret teachings, the promotion of faith (xin [信]) toward the teaching of tathāgatagarbha, and concern with the worst sinners, including the icchantika.

The sutra is most insistent that the Tathāgatagarbha and the self (Ātman) are real and that to deny their existence is to lapse into a state of dangerous spiritual imbalance. Thus, to seek out the Tathāgatagarbha — which is equated with the true Self — is deemed of great value. The Buddha teaches the bodhisattva Mañjuśrī that practicing the spiritual life is meaningful only because there is a 'self principle' (the Tathāgatagarbha or 'atma-dhatu' - 'essence of Self') with which the quest can be rewarded. He states:

Mañjuśrī, people churn milk because they understand that butter is present therein. Why do people not churn water ? Because that substance is not present there. Likewise, Mañjuśrī, people maintain moral discipline (śīla) and engage in the holy life (brahmacarya) because of the existence of the Tathāgata-garbha. Moreover, Mañjuśrī, people who want gold and are endowed with discernment, dig in cliffs. Why do they not dig in trees? They dig in rocks where gold-ore (suvarna-dhātu) is present, but they do not dig in trees, where there is no gold. Likewise, Mañjuśrī, people who discern the presence of the dhātu [i.e., buddha-dhatu, which means buddha principle] think to themselves, "I shall become a buddha" and so maintain the moral discipline and engage in the holy life. Furthermore, Mañjuśrī, if there were no dhātu, the holy life would be pointless. Just as butter will never be produced from water even if one were to churn it for a billion years, similarly there would be no benefit for those attached to a self who engage in the holy life and the moral discipline if there were no self principle [ātma-dhātu].

The sutra is remarkable for the vigor and passion with which Aṅgulimālīya teaches the Dharma and for its doctrine that at the heart of all beings is one unified principle: the buddha-dhatu (Buddha-nature) or Tathāgatagarbha. The doctrines of this sutra are also strikingly congruent with those of the much longer Mahāyāna Mahāparinirvāṇa Sūtra.

According to the Aṅgulimālīya Sūtra (2nd c. CE), tathāgatagarbha has the following fundamental natures: (Note: Aṅgulimālīya Sūtra (央掘魔羅經) Vol. 2: "Those who preach the Dharma should praise tathagatagarbha for its natures of permanency and reality. If one does not preach this way, then because one abandons tathagatagarbha, one should not sit on the lion throne, similar to that a caṇḍāla (旃陀羅) should not ride a king's elephant. All Buddhas pursue the arising of tathagatagarbha with various expedient methods but fail because non-arising is the buddha-nature; it manifests with countless wondrous appearances, purity, and solemnity. All Buddhas pursue the unreality of tathagatagarbha's intrinsic nature with various expedient methods but fail because reality is the buddha-nature; it manifests with countless wondrous appearances, purity, and solemnity. All Buddhas pursue the impermanence of tathagatagarbha's intrinsic nature with various expedient methods but fail because permanence is the buddha-nature; it manifests with countless wondrous appearances, purity, and solemnity. All Buddhas pursue the non-eternity of tathagatagarbha's intrinsic nature with various expedient methods but fail because eternity is the buddha-nature; it manifests with countless wondrous appearances, purity, and solemnity. All Buddhas pursue the variability of tathagatagarbha's intrinsic nature with various expedient methods but fail because invariability is the buddha-nature; it manifests with countless wondrous appearances, purity, and solemnity. All Buddhas pursue no silence of tathagatagarbha's intrinsic nature with various expedient methods but fail because silence is the Buddha-nature; it manifests with countless wondrous appearances, purity, and solemnity. All Buddhas pursue the badness of tathagatagarbha's intrinsic nature with various expedient methods but fail because non-badness is the buddha-nature; it manifests with countless wondrous appearances, purity, and solemnity. All Buddhas pursue the damage of tathagatagarbha's intrinsic nature with various expedient methods but fail because non-damage is the buddha-nature; it manifests with countless wondrous appearances, purity, and solemnity. All Buddhas pursue the sickness of tathagatagarbha's intrinsic nature with various expedient methods but fail because no sickness is the uddha-nature; it manifests with countless wondrous appearances, purity, and solemnity. All Buddhas pursue the aging of tathagatagarbha's intrinsic nature with various expedient methods but fail because non-aging is the buddha-nature; it manifests with countless wondrous appearances, purity, and solemnity. All Buddhas pursue the defilement of tathagatagarbha's intrinsic nature with various expedient methods but fail because undefilement is the buddha-nature; it manifests with countless wondrous appearances, purity, and solemnity.") (Note: Aṅgulimālīya Sūtra Vol. 2: "At that time, Aṅgulimālīya says the following verses: 'Tathagatagarbha manifests in the various worlds without knowing, evil views, and mistaken views; one should not be afraid while hearing the Buddha's correct Dharma that no-self will be attained after abandoning oneself. Tathagatagarbha is dissociated from arrogance, body, and life; the broad definition of tathagatagarbha is the world. One should bear the above concepts and be patient.")

- Neither arising nor ceasing - tathāgatagarbha permanently exists in the world, never arises, and therefore is never destroyed or perished. (Note: Aṅgulimālīya Sūtra Vol. 2: "All Buddhas pursue the arising of tathagatagarbha with various expedient methods but fail because non-arising is the Buddha-nature; it manifests with countless wondrous appearances, purity, and solemnity.")
- Independence - tathāgatagarbha possesses the intrinsic nature of independently existing without relying on other dharmas. Therefore, all worldly phenomena of aggregates, sense-fields, and elements have the nature of arising and ceasing but tathagatagarbha possesses the intrinsic nature of independence. In addition to tathagatagarbha itself, the intrinsic natures of tathagatagarbha also originally exist without increasing and decreasing and do not change owing to the variance of any conditions. (Note: Taishō Tripiṭaka Meeting of Father and Son Sūtra (父子合集經): "The king of gandharvas makes offerings for listening to the great pure Dharma. This Dharma exists in the reality and its original intrinsic natures do not increase or decrease; if one is attached to the phenomenon and discriminates it, then tathagatagarbha is not attainable. This Dharma is neither real nor empty. Due to the emptiness of its dharma-nature, the Buddha does not say anything.")
- Non-perceptiveness - tathāgatagarbha is not the perceptive mind; it does not have the perceptual functions of seeing, hearing, feeling, and knowing regarding the six external sense-objects which the perceptive mind has and therefore does not have the nature to discriminate goodness or badness either. (Note: The Sutra Explaining Undefiled Praise (說無垢稱經): "The Dharma does not have the nature of discrimination because it is dissociated with the mental consciousness.")
- Invariability - the tathāgatagarbha and its fundamental natures have the quality of permanence, eternity, imperishability, or diamond (vajra) nature. These are sustained everlastingly and do not change according to the variance of time and space. The Aṅgulimālīya states: "Permanence is the Buddha-nature," "Eternity is the Buddha-nature," "Invariability is the Buddha-nature," "Non-badness is the Buddha-nature," "Non-damage is the Buddha-nature," "No sickness is the Buddha-nature," "Non-aging is the Buddha-nature," (Note: Aṅgulimālīya Sūtra Vol. 2: "All Buddhas pursue the impermanence of tathagatagarbha's intrinsic nature with various expedient methods but fail because permanence is the Buddha-nature; it manifests with countless wondrous appearances, purity, and solemnity. All Buddhas pursue the non-eternity of tathagatagarbha's intrinsic nature with various expedient methods but fail because eternity is the Buddha-nature; it manifests with countless wondrous appearances, purity, and solemnity. All Buddhas pursue the variability of tathagatagarbha's intrinsic nature with various expedient methods but fail because invariability is the Buddha-nature; it manifests with countless wondrous appearances, purity, and solemnity." "Tathagatagarbha neither ages nor dies.")
- Storability - tathāgatagarbha stores a sentient being's seeds of all phenomena, including the seeds of good, bad, and neutral karmas.

== See also ==
- Anunatva-Apurnatva-Nirdesa
- Dolpopa Sherab Gyaltsen
- Eternal Buddha
- Parinirvana
- Purity in Buddhism
- Śrīmālādevī Sūtra
- Tathāgatagarbha Sūtra
- Mahaparinirvana Sutra
