= South Putuo Temple =

Buddhist temple in Fujian, China

- 南普陀寺
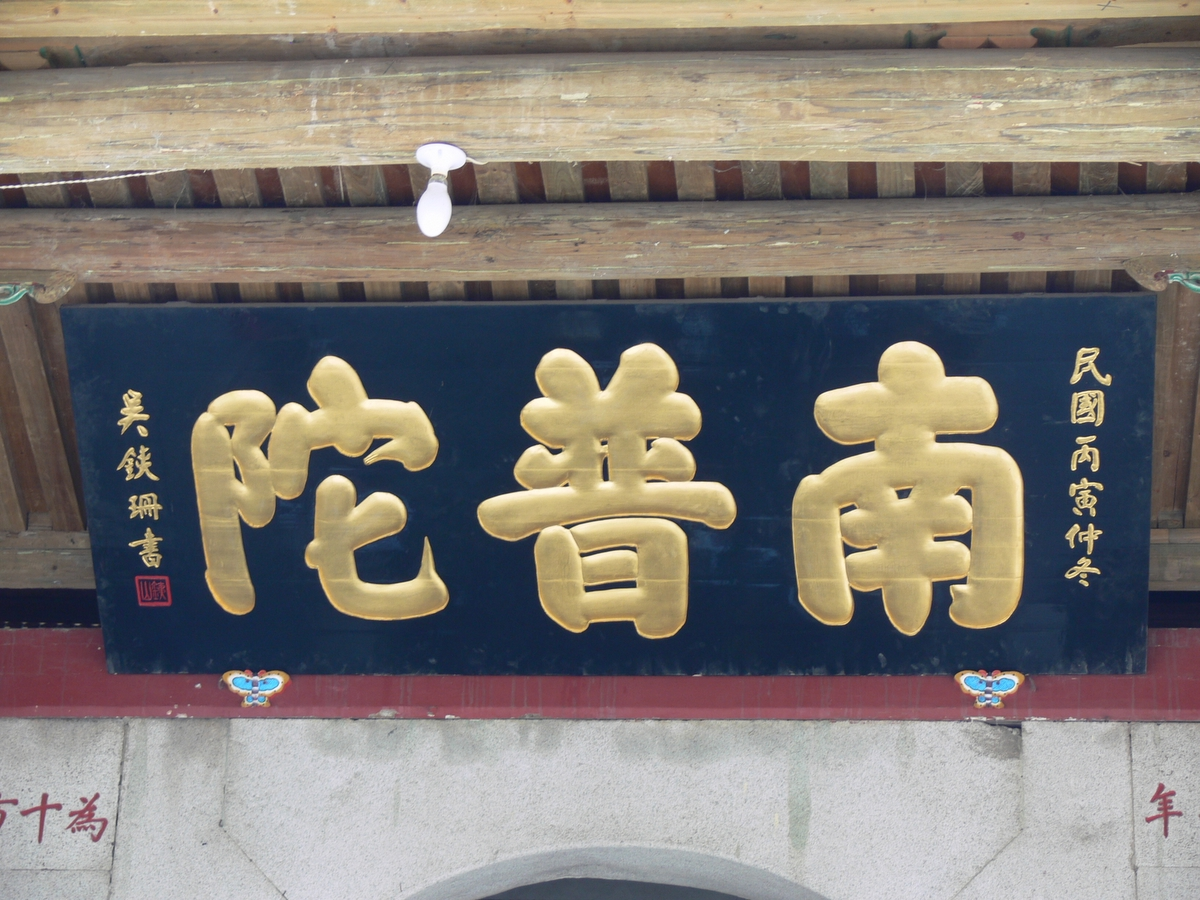
- South Putuo Temple

- Location within Fujian

Religion
- Affiliation: Buddhism
- Sect: Chan Buddhism

Location
- Location: Xiamen, Fujian, China
- Interactive map of South Putuo Temple
- Coordinates: 24°26′35″N 118°05′30″E

Architecture
- Style: Chinese architecture
- Established: Tang dynasty

Website
- www.nanputuo.com

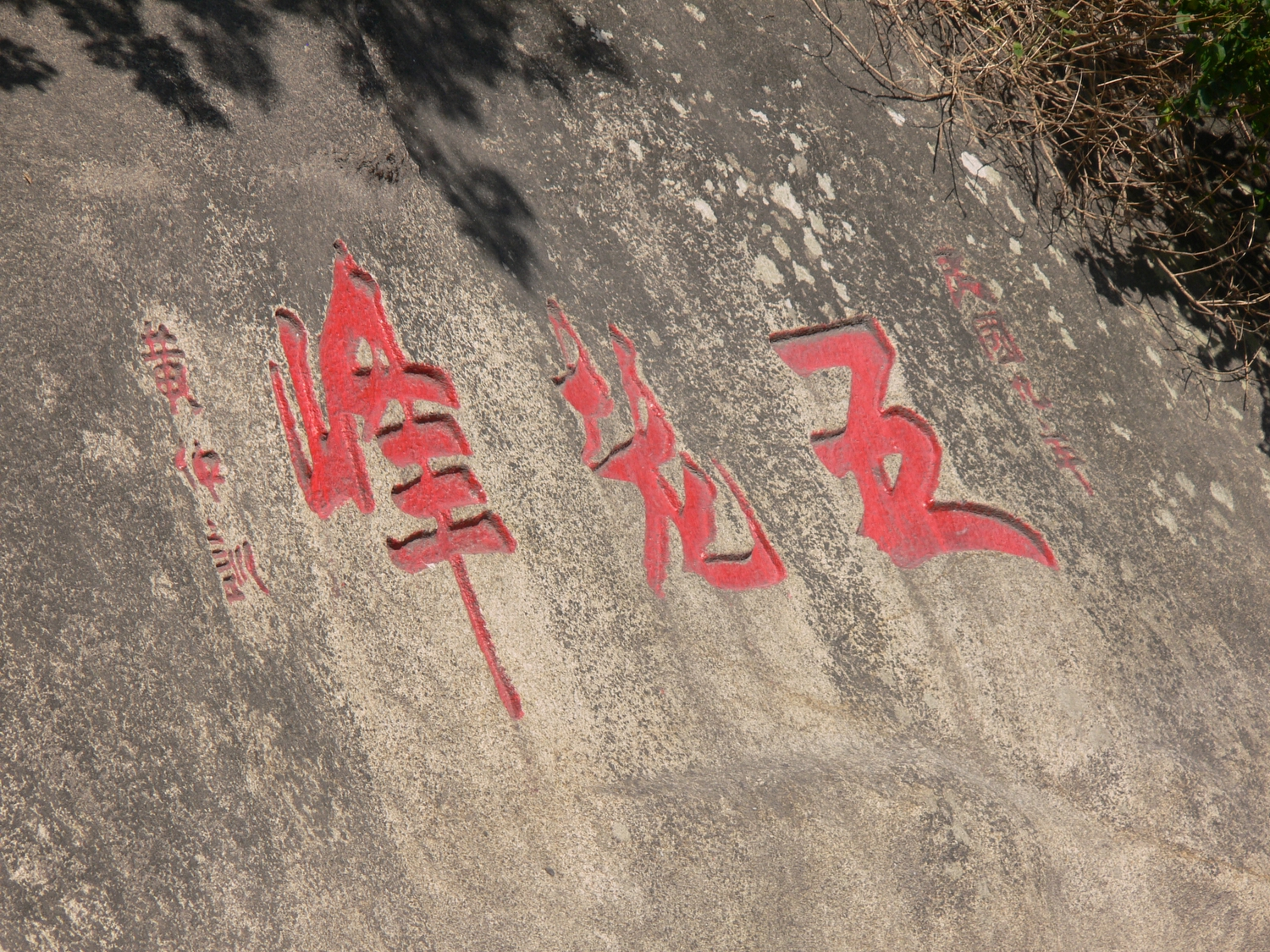
Wulao Peak

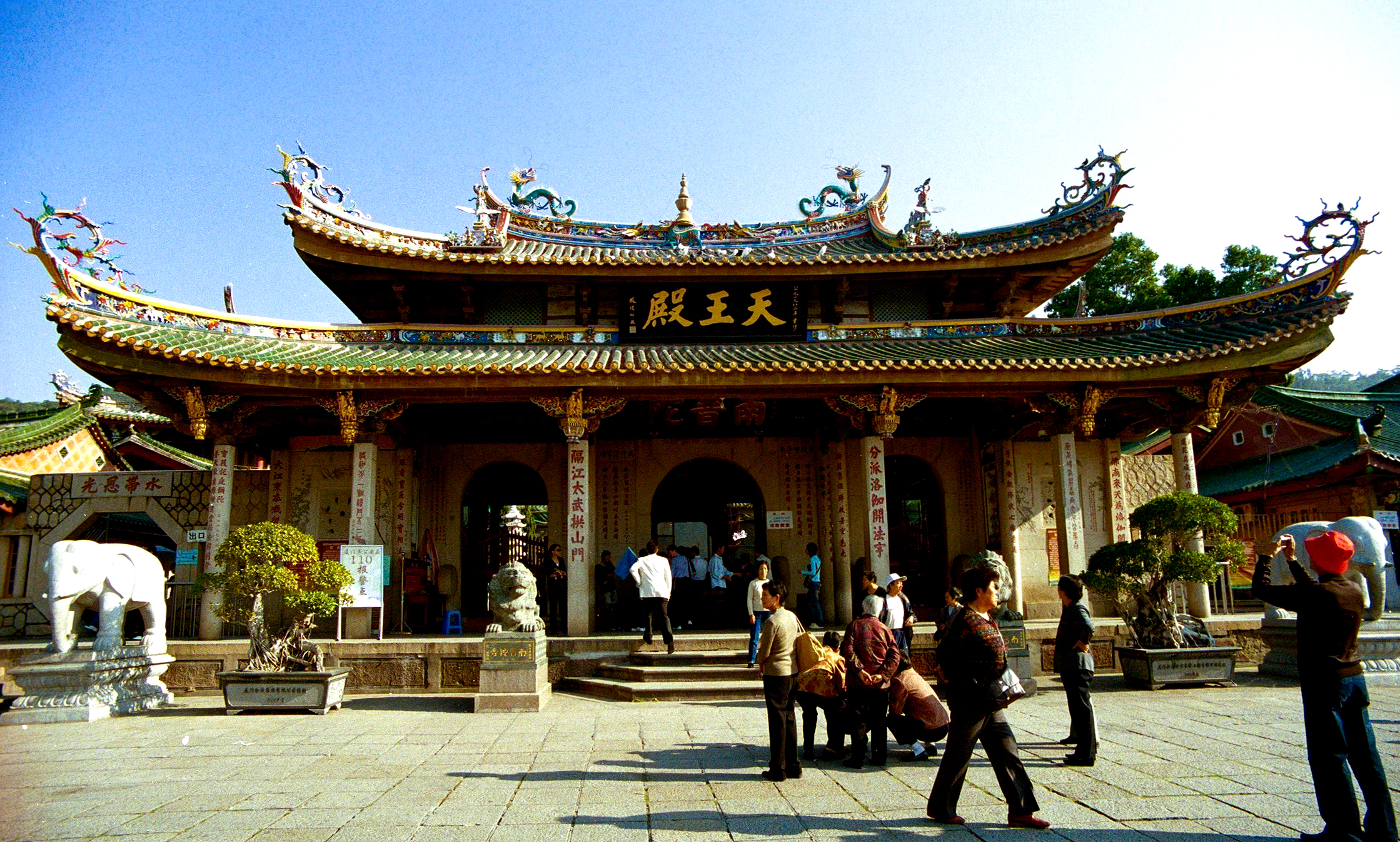
Heavenly Kings Hall

South Putuo or Nanputuo (Chinese: 南普陀寺; pinyin: Nán Pǔtuó Sì; Pe̍h-ōe-jī: Lâm Phó͘-tô Sī) is a famous Buddhist temple founded in the Tang dynasty in the Chinese city of Xiamen. It is so named because it is south of the Buddhist holy site Mount Putuo in Zhejiang Province.

== Location ==
The South Putuo Temple is located on the southeast of Xiamen Island. It is surrounded by the graceful sea and the Wulao Peaks behind the temple. The Wulao peaks is a small mountain range that rises on the island. It enjoys a picturesque view of Xiamen and the surrounding district of Haicang, Gulangyu and Zhangzhou City. South Putuo Temple has many deep caves and verdant woods. It is adjacent to Xiamen University and Lu River.

== History ==
During the final years of the Tang dynasty, Buddhist monks who inhabited the place had established it into a sacred Buddhist temple. It used to have different names. The temple was dismantled during Yuan dynasty and reconverted into a Buddhist temple in Ming dynasty. In 1684, around the beginning of the Qing dynasty, general Shi Lang donated generously to rebuild and expanded the temple buildings, where a shrine hall for Guanyin Bodhisattva was installed and worshipped. The general named the temple after the Buddhist sacred site Mount Putuo of Zhejiang Province, which is considered the abode of Guanyin. In 1924, Master Hui Quan was appointed the first abbot of the South Putuo Temple and he set up Minnan Buddhist College in 1925. Several prominent scholarly monks like Hong Yi and Yin Shun taught in the college. The temple suffered much damages by the red guards during Cultural Revolution and was converted into a factory. The temple underwent further renovation in the 1980s and the first abbot after cultural revolution was elected in 1989.

== See also ==
- Chinese Buddhism
- Mount Putuo
- Taixu, former abbot (1927-1933)
