= Chinese Buddhism =

Form of Buddhism native to China and practiced around the world

- Traditional Chinese: 漢傳佛教
- Simplified Chinese: 汉传佛教
Transcriptions
Standard Mandarin
- Hanyu Pinyin: Hànchuán Fójiào
- Bopomofo: ㄏㄢˋ ㄔㄨㄢˊ ㄈㄛˊ ㄐㄧㄠˋ
- Wade–Giles: Han^{4}-ch‘uan^{2} Fo^{2}-chiao^{4}
- IPA: [xân.ʈʂʰwǎn fwǒ.tɕjâʊ]
Yue: Cantonese
- Yale Romanization: Honchyùhn Fahtgaau
- Jyutping: Hon^{3}-cyun^{4} Fat^{6}-gaau^{3}
- IPA: [hɔn˧.tsʰyn˩ fɐt̚˨.kaw˧]
Southern Min
- Hokkien POJ: Hàn-thoân Hu̍t-kàu

Institutions of Chinese Buddhism

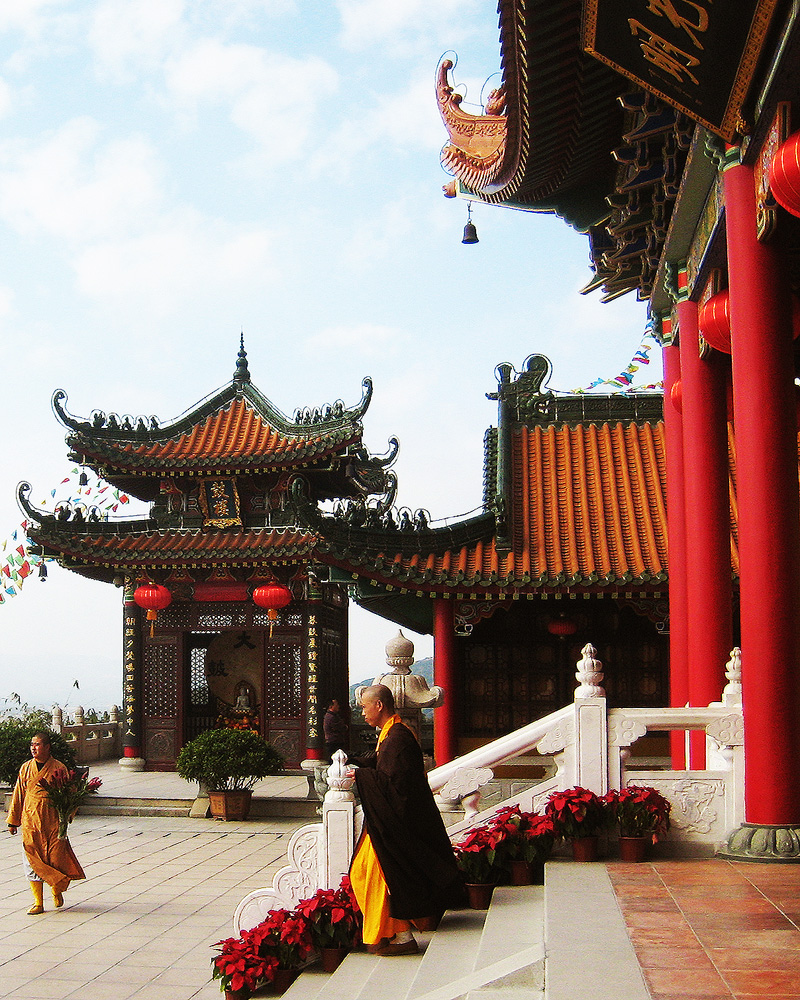
Buddhist monks at Jintai Temple in Zhuhai, Guangdong

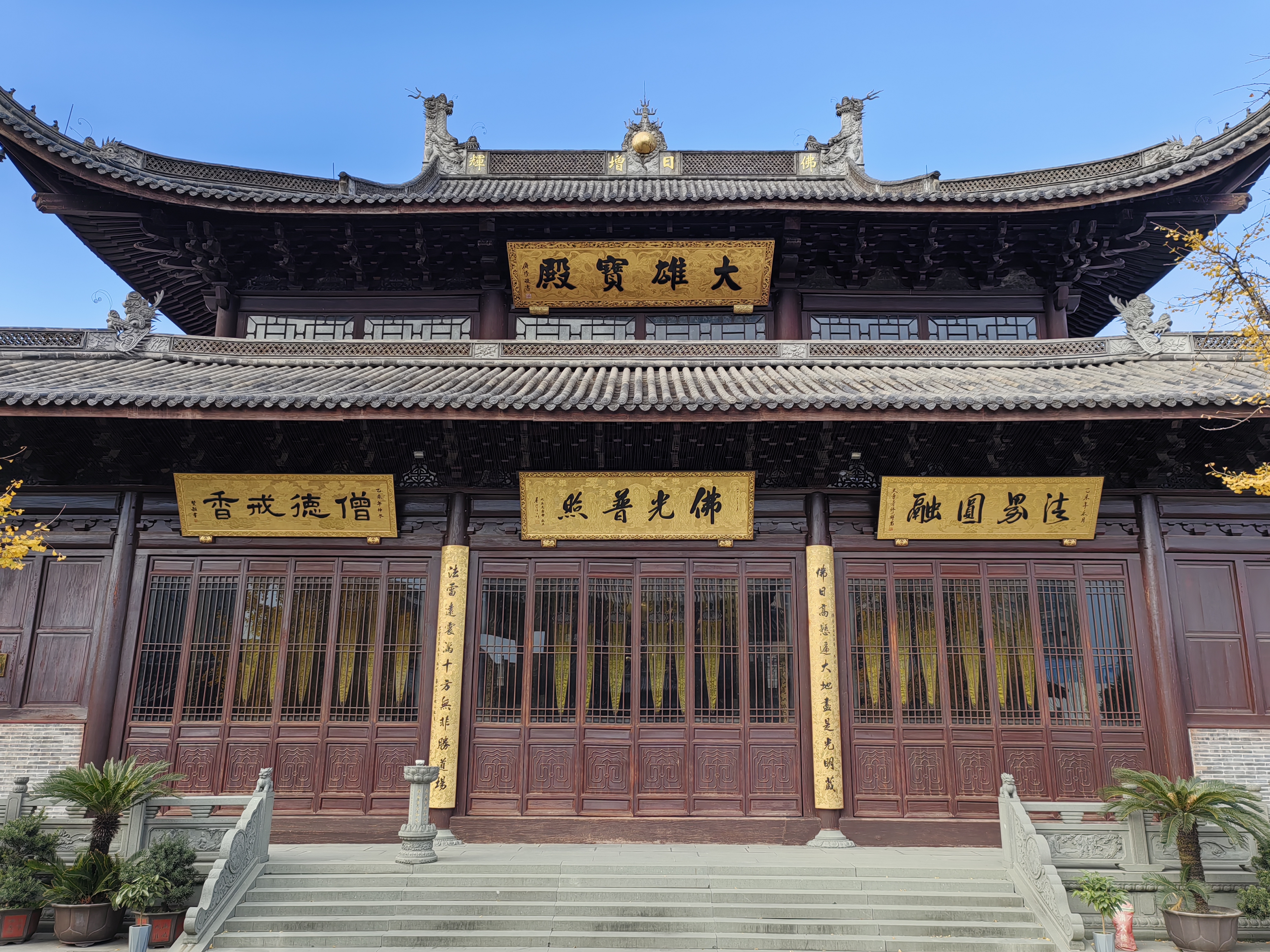
The Daxiong Baodian of Guangde Nunnery, Ningbo

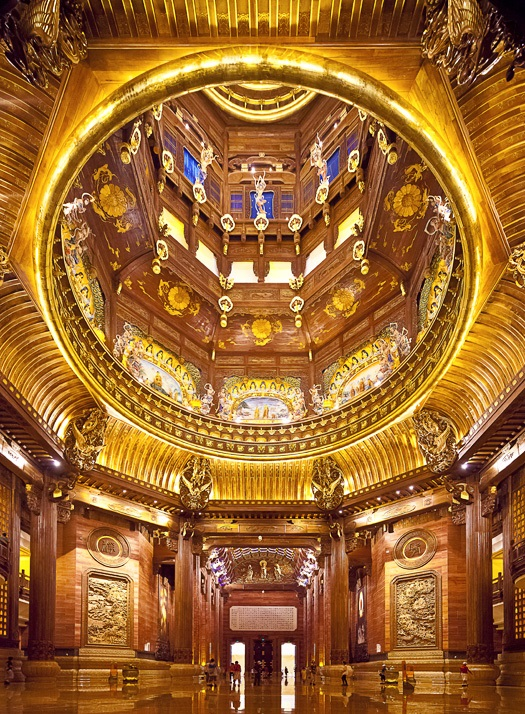
Interior of the Ling Shan Brahma Palace in Wuxi, Jiangsu

Chinese Buddhism, alternatively Han Chinese Buddhism or Han Buddhism (traditional Chinese: 漢傳佛教; simplified Chinese: 汉传佛教) is a Sinicized form of Mahayana Buddhism, which draws on the Chinese Buddhist canon (大藏經; Dàzàngjīng; "Great Storage of Scriptures") as well as numerous Chinese traditions. It is the largest institutionalized religion in mainland China. As of 2020, there are an estimated 42 to 53 million Chinese Buddhists in the People's Republic of China. It is also a major religion in Taiwan and Singapore, as well as among the Chinese diaspora.

Buddhism was first introduced to China during the Han dynasty (206 BCE – 220 CE). It was promoted by multiple emperors, especially during the Tang dynasty (618–907 CE), which helped it spread across the country. The translation of a large body of Indian Buddhist scriptures with the inclusion of originally composed Chinese works based on Taoist and Confucian interpretations and influence of the time was compiled in a vast text referred to as Chinese Buddhist open canon and was foundational in creating, what is known as indigenous Chinese Buddhism. This form of Buddhism due to embracing local customs, rites, rituals and folk religion had a far-reaching impact for the dissemination of Buddhism throughout the countries of the East Asian cultural sphere, such as North Korea, South Korea, Japan, and Vietnam. Chinese Buddhism also developed various unique traditions of Buddhist thought and practice, including Tiantai, Huayan, Chan, Pure Land, and Zhenyan Buddhism.

== History ==
Buddhist expansion in Asia: Mahayana Buddhism first entered the Chinese Empire (Han dynasty) through the Silk Road during the Kushan Era. The overland and maritime Silk Roads were interlinked and complementary, forming what scholars have called the "great circle of Buddhism".

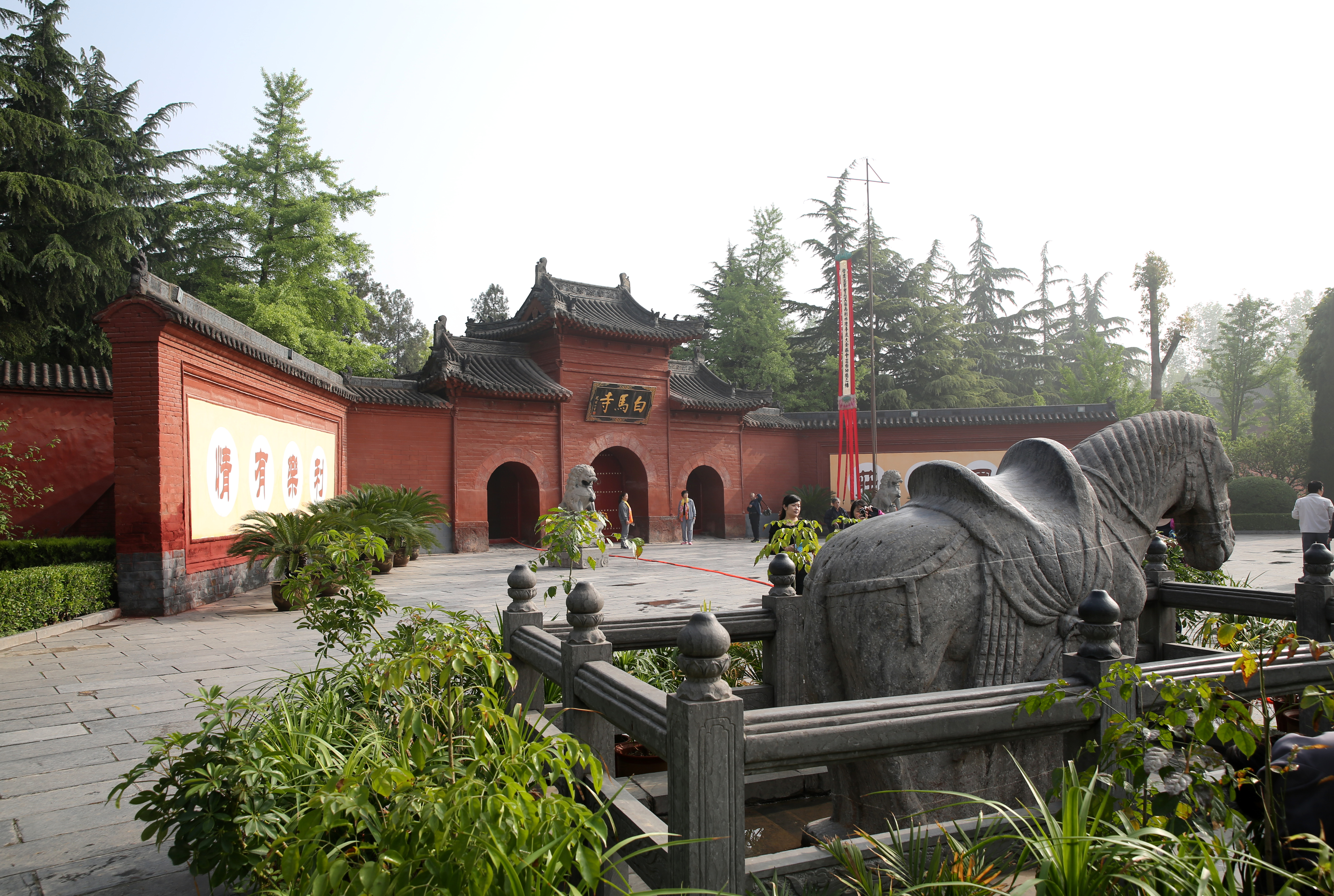
White Horse Temple in Luoyang, one of the earliest Chinese Buddhist temples

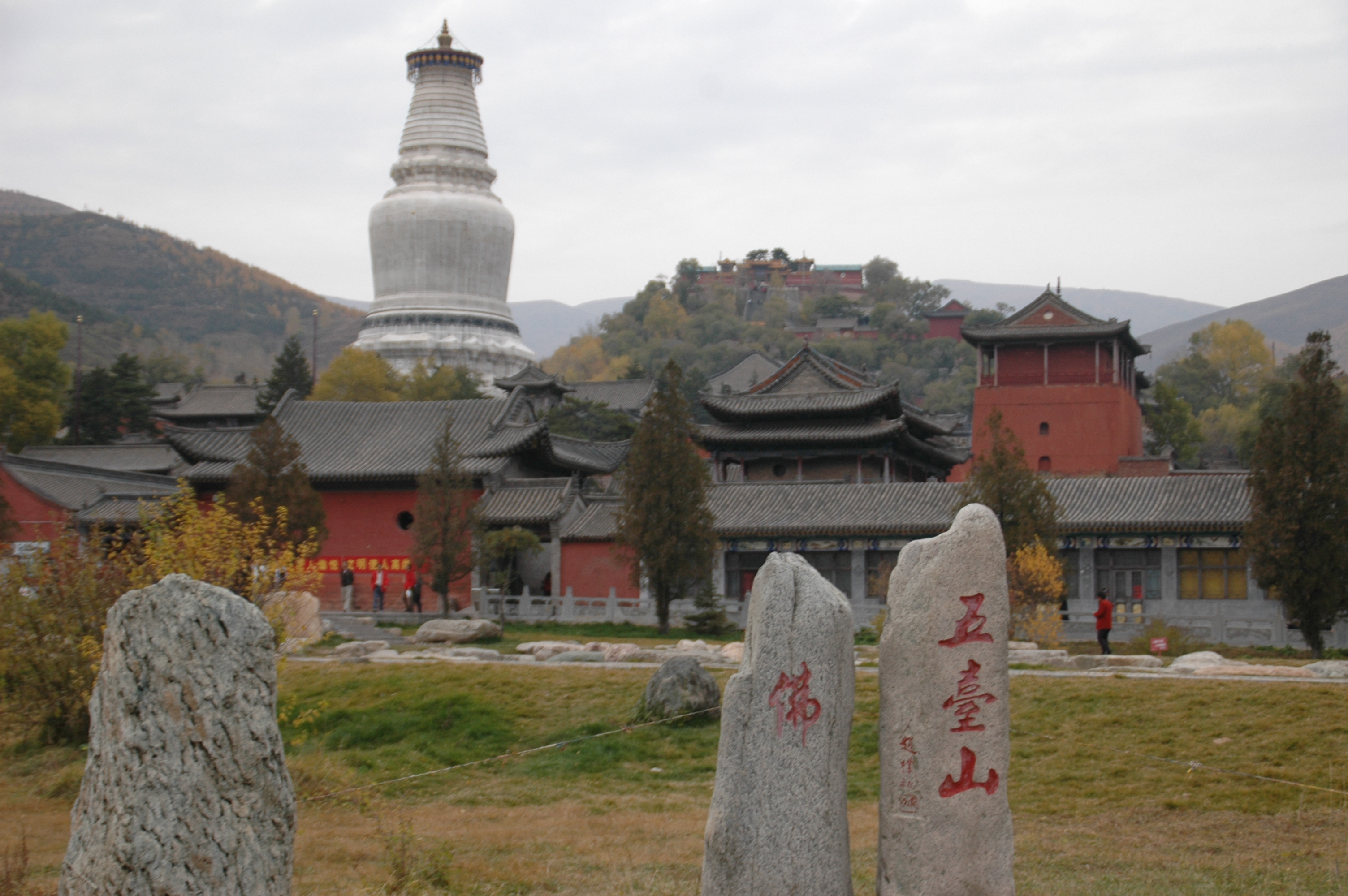
Buddhist temple at Wutaishan

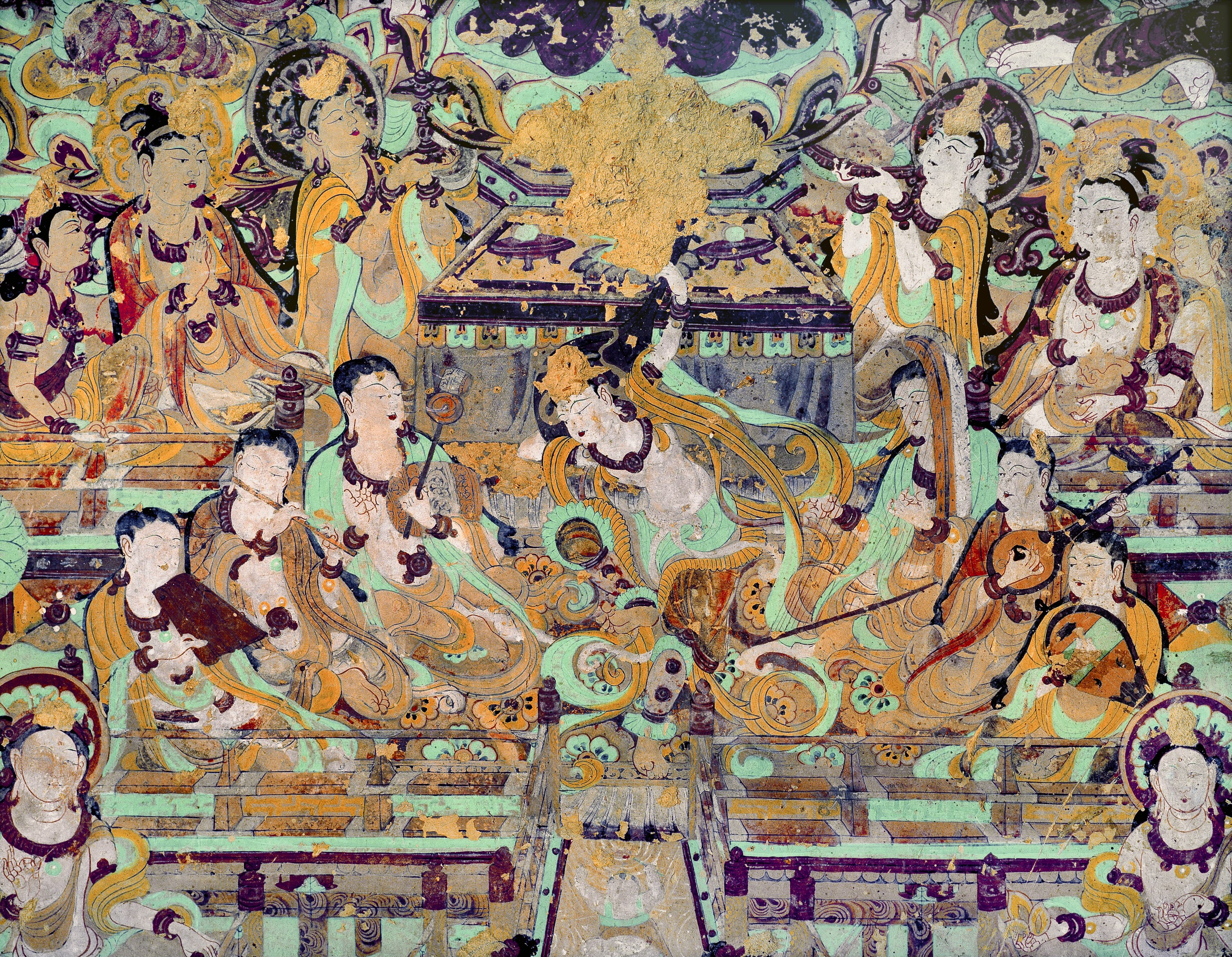
Buddhist art from the Mogao Caves at Dunhuang (Gansu). Dunhuang was a thriving center of Buddhism between 500 and 1000 CE.

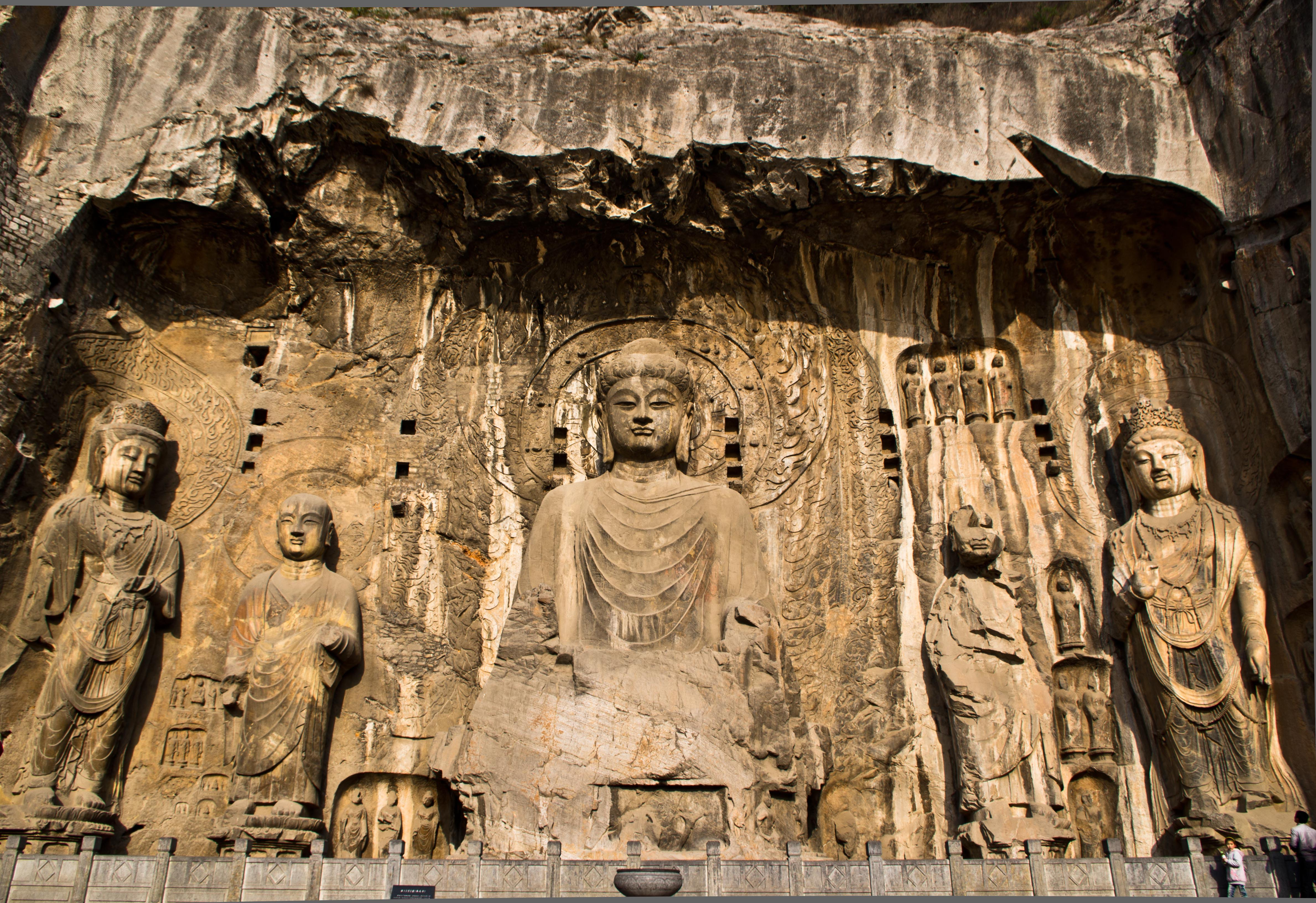
Statues at Longmen Grottoes, Luoyang

=== The establishment of Buddhism in China ===
Buddhist missionaries began bringing Buddhism to China during the Han dynasty, and the religion was present in China at the beginning of the common era. Buddhist missionaries made use of both the overland Central Asian Silk Road and the maritime routes. Initially, Buddhism was poorly understood and often confused with and mixed with Taoism. The Chinese saw many similarities between the two religions. There was also much criticism leveled at the new foreign religion by the Confucian elites. Centuries after Buddhism originated in India, Mahayana Buddhism arrived in China through the Silk Route in the 1st century CE via Tibet.

One of the first tasks of the initial missionaries was the translation of Buddhist texts. The first surviving translations of Buddhist texts into Chinese were those of the 2nd-century Parthian, An Shigao (Chinese: 安世高), who worked in the capital of Luoyang. His work was followed by the extensive Mahayana translations of the Kushan monk Lokakṣema (支婁迦讖, active c. 164–186), as well as the work of Dharmarakṣa (3rd century). During this early period, the Dharmaguptaka school was influential in establishing Buddhism in China. This resulted in the widespread adoption of the Dharmaguptaka school's Vinaya (monastic rule) by all Chinese Buddhist schools.

In the 4th-century, northern China fell into political upheaval and division during the Sixteen Kingdoms period (304–439). Many of these kingdoms were led by non-Han rulers, who were drawn to Buddhism partially due to its foreign elements. Monks such as Fotu Cheng (232–348) held high-ranking government positions, and the common people were allowed to freely practice the religion. Buddhism's growing popularity also permeated to the south, where the Chinese Eastern Jin dynasty (318–420) ruled.

The arrival of the Kuchan scholar Kumārajīva (334–413) was a key event. Unlike the previous translators, Kumārajīva was supported by the state and given the title of national preceptor. The high-quality translations produced by his disciples had a significant impact on Chinese Buddhism. He is also known for introducing the Madhyamaka school of Buddhist philosophy, which would later be called Sanlun (the Three Treatise school). His work also established an Indic foundation for Chinese Buddhist philosophy, which previously had been heavily influenced by Taoist philosophy.

By the 460s, Buddhism was a mainstream institution in China, and its iconography and art were widely recognized. The Dunhuang and Yungang cave complexes are great examples of early Chinese Buddhist art from this period.

Another important translator was Paramārtha (Zhēndì, 499–569 CE), who, along with his Chinese disciples, translated numerous works on Abhidharma, Yogachara philosophy, and other Mahayana texts. The work of other sixth-century translators such as Bodhiruci and Ratnamati also contributed to the establishment of a new Chinese Yogacara school, also known as the Consciousness-Only school (Chinese: 唯識宗; pinyin: wéishí-zōng).

=== The development of a Chinese Buddhism ===
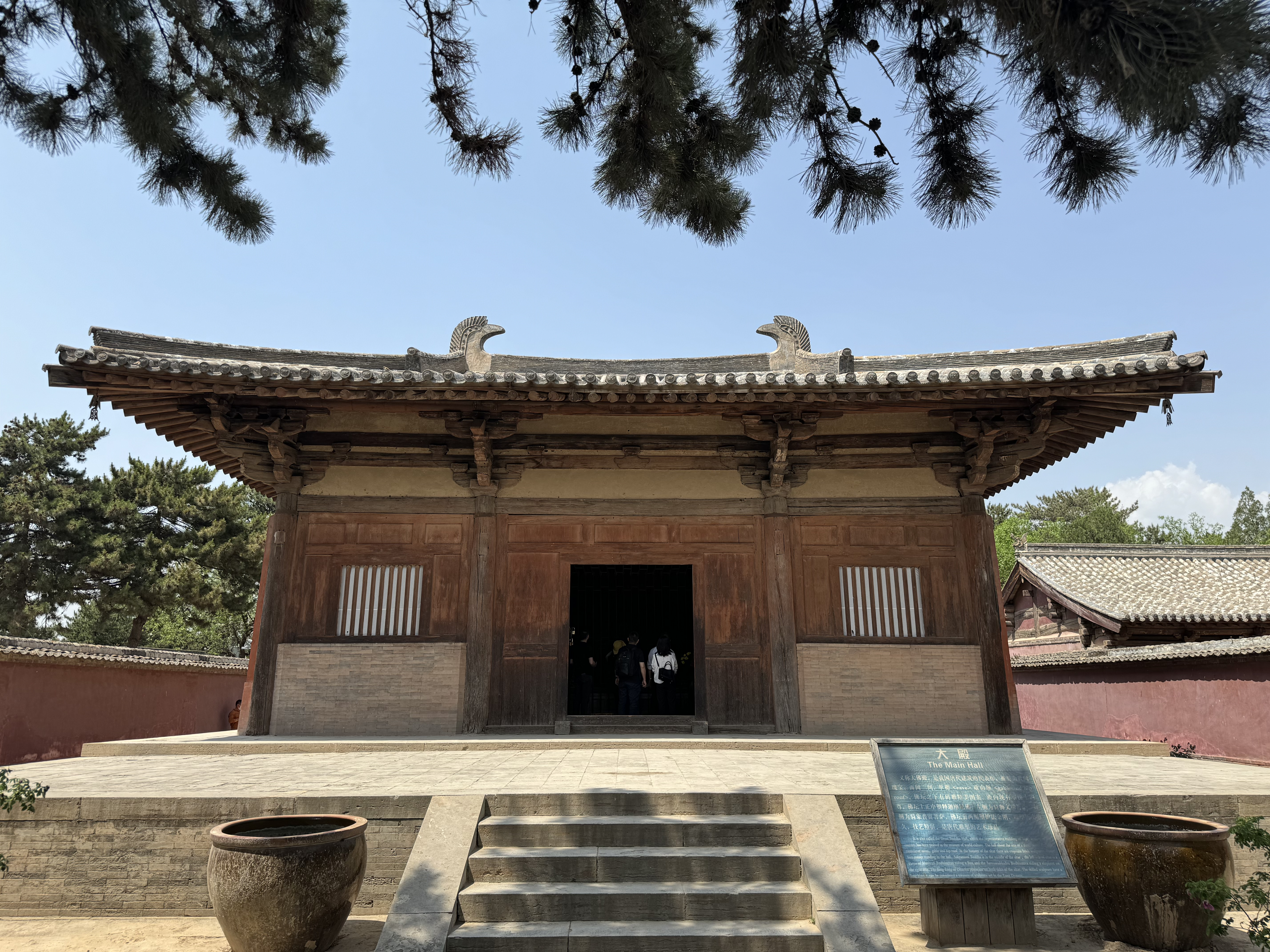
The Great Buddha Hall of Nanchan Temple at Mount Wutai, Shanxi. Originally built in the Tang dynasty, it is the oldest surviving timber architecture in China.

The 6th and 7th centuries saw a flowering of new and unique Chinese Buddhist traditions, including:

- The Tiantai school, mainly founded by the efforts of master Zhiyi (538–597 CE) and based on the Lotus Sutra and the works of Zhiyi.
- The Huayan (Avatamsaka Sutra) school, based on the works of Chinese masters such as Dushun (557–640), Zhiyan (602–668), and Fazang (643–712).
- The Pure Land tradition, based on the veneration of Amitabha and the works of Buddhist monks such as Tanluan (476–542), Daochuo (562–645), and Shandao (613–681).
- Chan Buddhism, based on the teachings of various Chan masters such as Bodhidharma, Dazu Huike (487–593), Sengcan (d. 606), Dayi Daoxin (580–651), and Daman Hongren (601–674).

During the Tang dynasty, the monk Xuanzang (602–664) journeyed to India and back and wrote extensive and detailed reports of his findings, which have subsequently become important for the study of India during this period. Xuanzang also brought back many Buddhist texts and led a group of translators responsible for many influential Chinese translations of classic Buddhist works. His efforts led to the establishment of the idealistic Yogachara (Consciousness-only) tradition in East Asia.

The Tang era was a period of significant development for Buddhism in China. During this time, a sinicized Buddhism was widely accepted and practiced throughout the empire, with many monasteries and temples. The religion was popular with all social classes and was influential on Chinese culture, having more followers than Taoism. Buddhist themes can be found in much of the literature of this period, such as in the works of famous poets such as Wang Wei (701–761) and Bo Juyi (772–846). Artistic complexes from this period, such as the Longmen Grottoes, also attest to the artistic expression of Chinese Buddhism during this era.

A well-known proponent of the religion during the Tang era was Empress Wu Zetian (r. 690–705), who is known for her promotion of the Longmen cave complex. She also depicted herself as a bodhisattva.

The next important event in the history of Chinese Buddhism was the arrival of Subhakarasimha, Vajrabodhi, and Amoghavajra, and their establishment of Zhenyan Buddhism (or Chinese Esoteric Buddhism) from 716 to 720, during the reign of Emperor Xuanzong of Tang. This Chinese form of Vajrayana Buddhism now became popular with the elites, and by the time of Emperor Daizong of Tang (r. 762–779), its influence among the upper classes was significant.

The Great Anti-Buddhist Persecution (841–845) under Emperor Wuzong of Tang greatly impacted and weakened the Buddhist institutions in China. Perhaps the main reason for this persecution was the Chinese state's need for taxes and wealth.

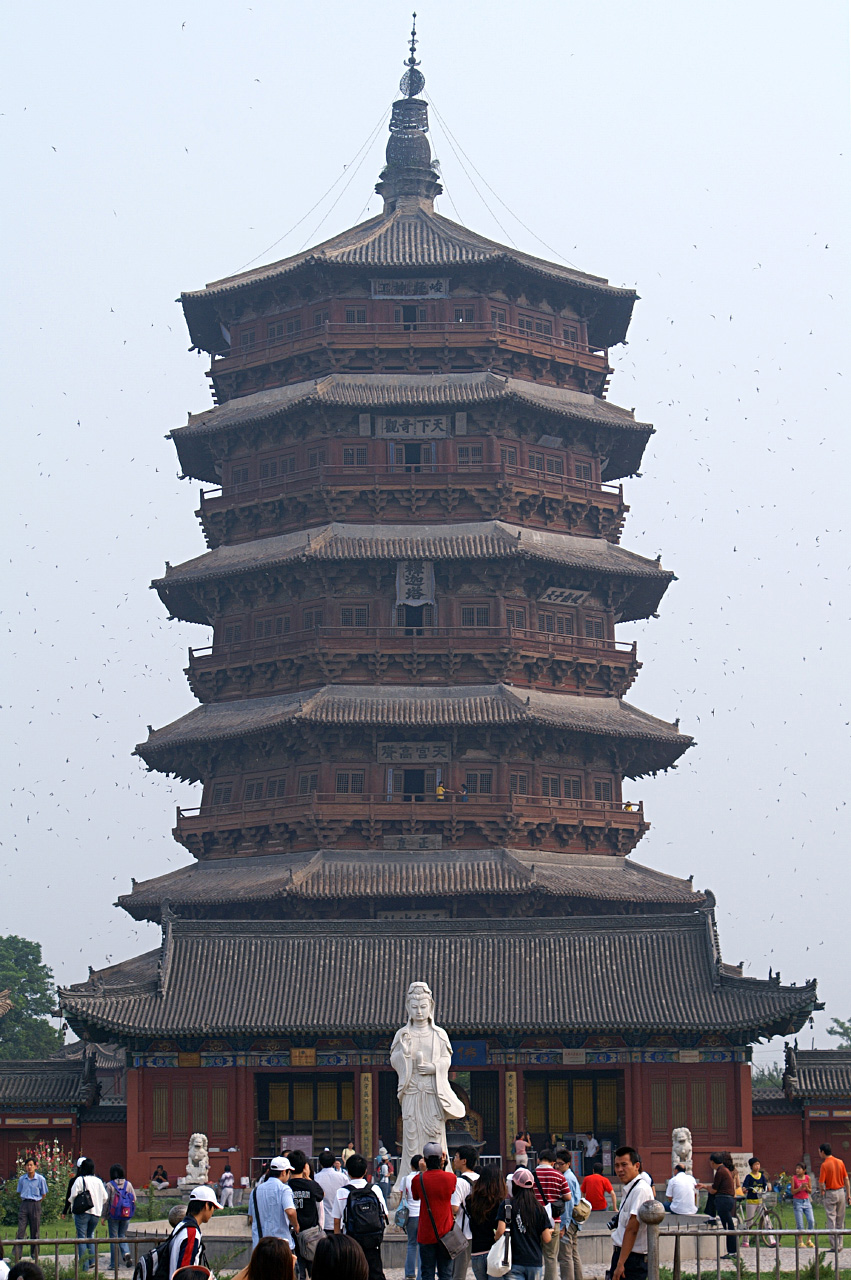
Pagoda of Fogong Temple at Ying County, Shanxi, constructed 1056–1195 during the Liao dynasty

The Five Dynasties and Ten Kingdoms period (907–960/979), an era of political upheaval and civil war, negatively impacted the religion. Various Chinese Buddhist traditions contracted or died out during this period.

The Song dynasty (960–1279) saw the flourishing of Chinese Buddhist culture. During this era, Chan Buddhism grew to become the most influential school, with close ties to the imperial government and an organized system of temple rank and administration. It was during this time that the Five Houses of Chan developed. Many classic Chan texts were written during this era, such as the koan collections of the Linji school, such as the Blue Cliff Record (1125) and The Gateless Gate (1228).

Likewise, during this time, the works of Hongzhi Zhengjue (1091–1157) developed the meditation method of silent illumination. Both of these traditions of Chan practice were influential (and remain so) on East Asian Zen Buddhism (including Japanese Zen, Korean Seon, and Vietnamese Thiền).

The Yuan dynasty (1271–1368) patronized Tibetan Buddhism; thus, during this period, there was a steady growth of this tradition in China. A common perception was that this patronage of lamas caused corrupt forms of tantra to become widespread. When the Yuan dynasty was overthrown and the Ming dynasty was established, the Tibetan lamas were expelled from the court, and this form of Buddhism was denounced as being an unorthodox path.

During the Ming dynasty (1368–1644), there was a revival of the study of Chinese traditions such as Tiantai, Huayan, and Yogachara, and most monks belonged to the two dominant Chan schools: Linji and Caodong. At this point in its history, Chinese Buddhism had also become quite syncretic, drawing from all the main Chinese traditions. An example of this is the figure of Hanshan Deqing, one of the great reformers of Chinese Buddhism. Like many of his contemporaries, he advocated the dual practice of the Chan and Pure Land methods. He also directed practitioners in the use of mantras as well as scripture reading. He was also renowned as a lecturer and commentator and was admired for his strict adherence to the precepts.

=== Modernity ===
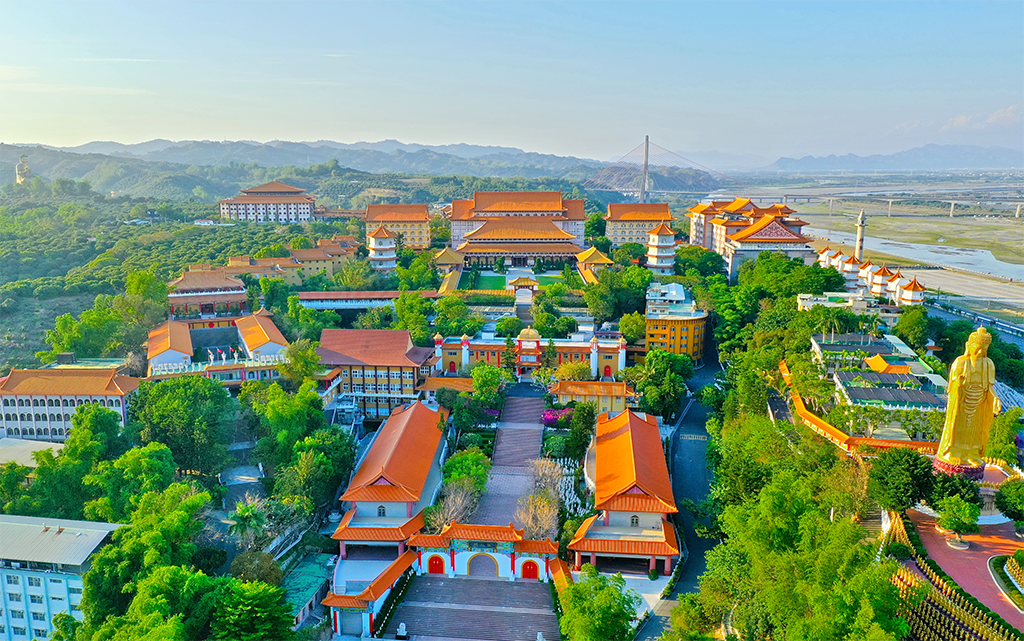
An aerial view of Fo Guang Shan Monastery in Kaohsiung, Taiwan

During the Qing dynasty (1644–1911), the imperial court shifted its support to the Gelug school of Tibetan Buddhism. Chinese Buddhism suffered during the various imperial and internal conflicts of the Qing dynasty, especially the Taiping Rebellion (December 1850 – August 1864), which saw many temples destroyed and scriptures burned by rebels. This era also saw the arrival of Christian missionaries to China, a right which had been granted to the Western powers after the Opium Wars. In the late imperial period, the beliefs and practices of Buddhism were prevalent among the laypeople, but laypeople had a generally loose relationship with Buddhist institutions, visiting temples only on Buddhist holidays and seeking ritual services as needs arose.

During the Republican period (1912–1949), there were efforts to reform and modernize Chinese Buddhism in response to the challenges of modernity. The most notable of these reformers were the Humanistic Buddhists, such as Taixu and Yin Shun. Humanistic Buddhism sought to move away from ritualistic and otherworldly obsessions to embrace more worldly pursuits such as education and charitable work. There was also a revival of Chan by Hsu Yun and Sheng Yen as well as a revival of Tiantai by Dixian and Tanxu. Buddhist organizations in the Republic of China period developed congregational features.

==== People's Republic of China ====
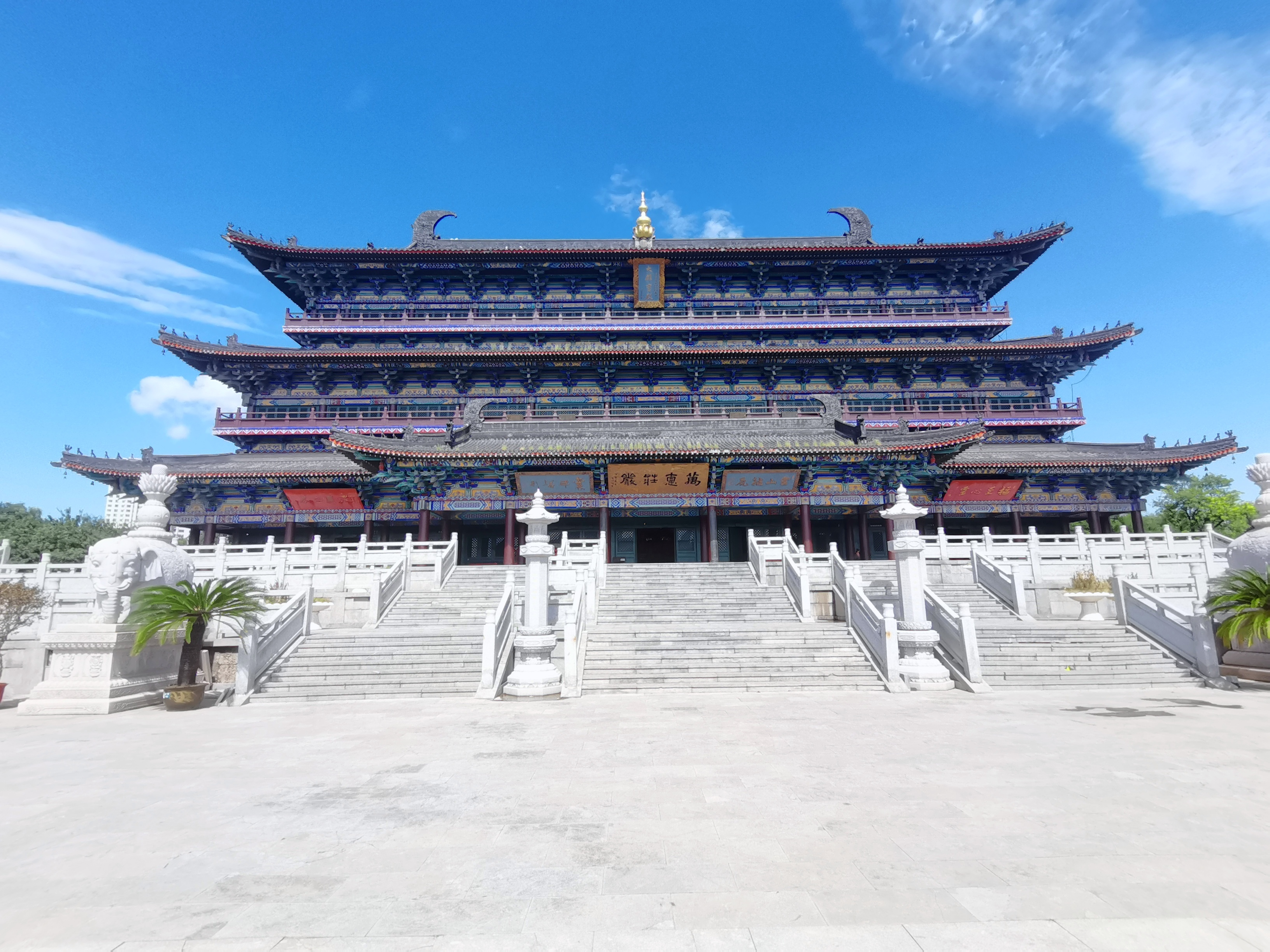
Guangyou Temple at Liaoyang, Liaoning, rebuilt in 2002

After the Chinese Communist Revolution, many Buddhists and monastics joined the Republican exodus to Taiwan. In the latter half of the twentieth century, many new Buddhist temples and organizations were set up by the exiles in Taiwan, including Fo Guang Shan, Dharma Drum Mountain, and Tzu Chi. These organizations also became influential in Mainland China after the end of the Cultural Revolution.

Chinese Buddhism suffered extensive repression, persecution, and destruction during the Cultural Revolution (from 1966 until Mao Zedong's death in 1976). Maoist propaganda depicted Buddhism as one of the Four Olds, as a superstitious instrument of the ruling class and as counter-revolutionary. Buddhist monks were attacked, disrobed, arrested, and sent to camps. Buddhist writings were burned. Buddhist temples, monasteries, and art were systematically destroyed, and Buddhist lay believers ceased any public display of their religion.

During the normalization period (Boluan Fanzheng, 1977 to the early 1980s) led by Deng Xiaoping, a revival of Chinese Buddhism began to take place. This was a period that saw the restoration of damaged Buddhist temples such as the Guoqing Temple and Guanghua Temple, as well as the return of monastic ordination and Buddhist institutions. Monks such as Zhenchan (真禪) and Mengcan (夢參), who were trained in the Chan and Huayan traditions, traveled widely throughout China as well as other countries, such as the United States, and lectured on both Chan and Huayan teachings. Monks were now required to obtain certificates from the authorities that permit them to reside in monasteries.

The Buddhist Association of China is the sole official government supervisory organ of Buddhism in the country. It is directed by the United Front Work Department of the Chinese Communist Party (CCP).

== Teaching and practice ==
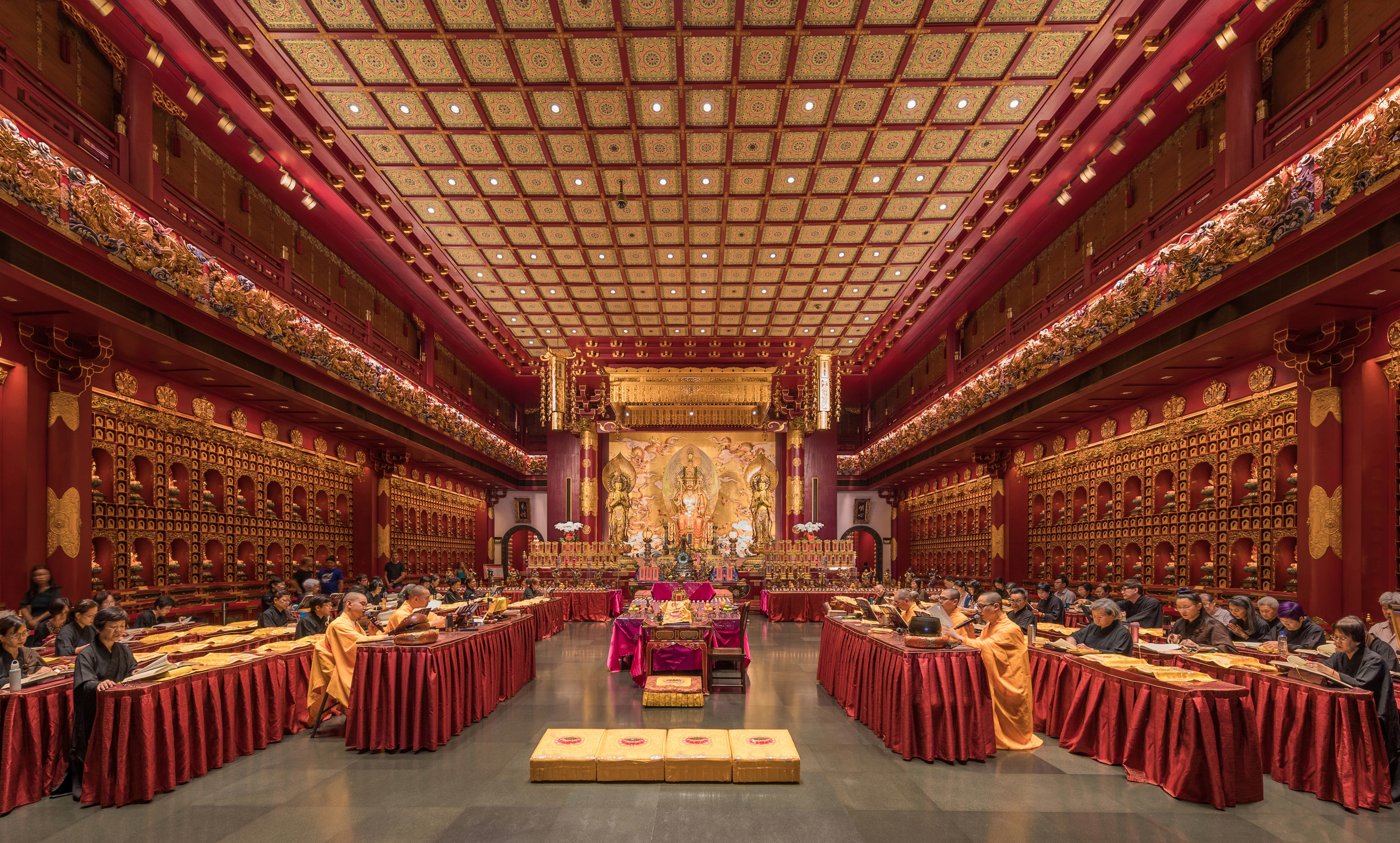
Buddhist monastics and laypeople chanting sutras in the Buddha Tooth Relic Temple, Singapore

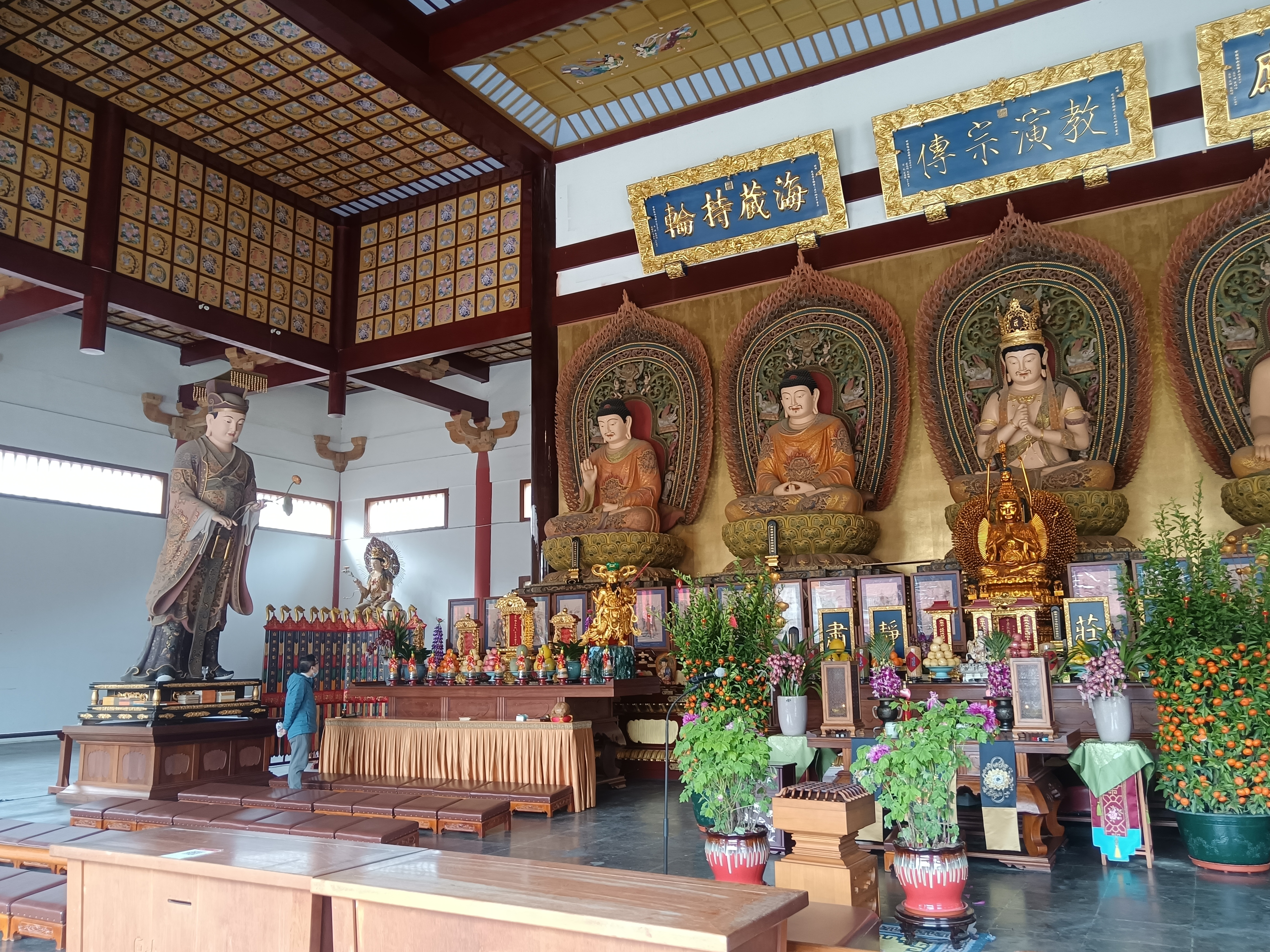
Buddha statues at the Mahavira Hall of Baoning Temple, Hunan, China

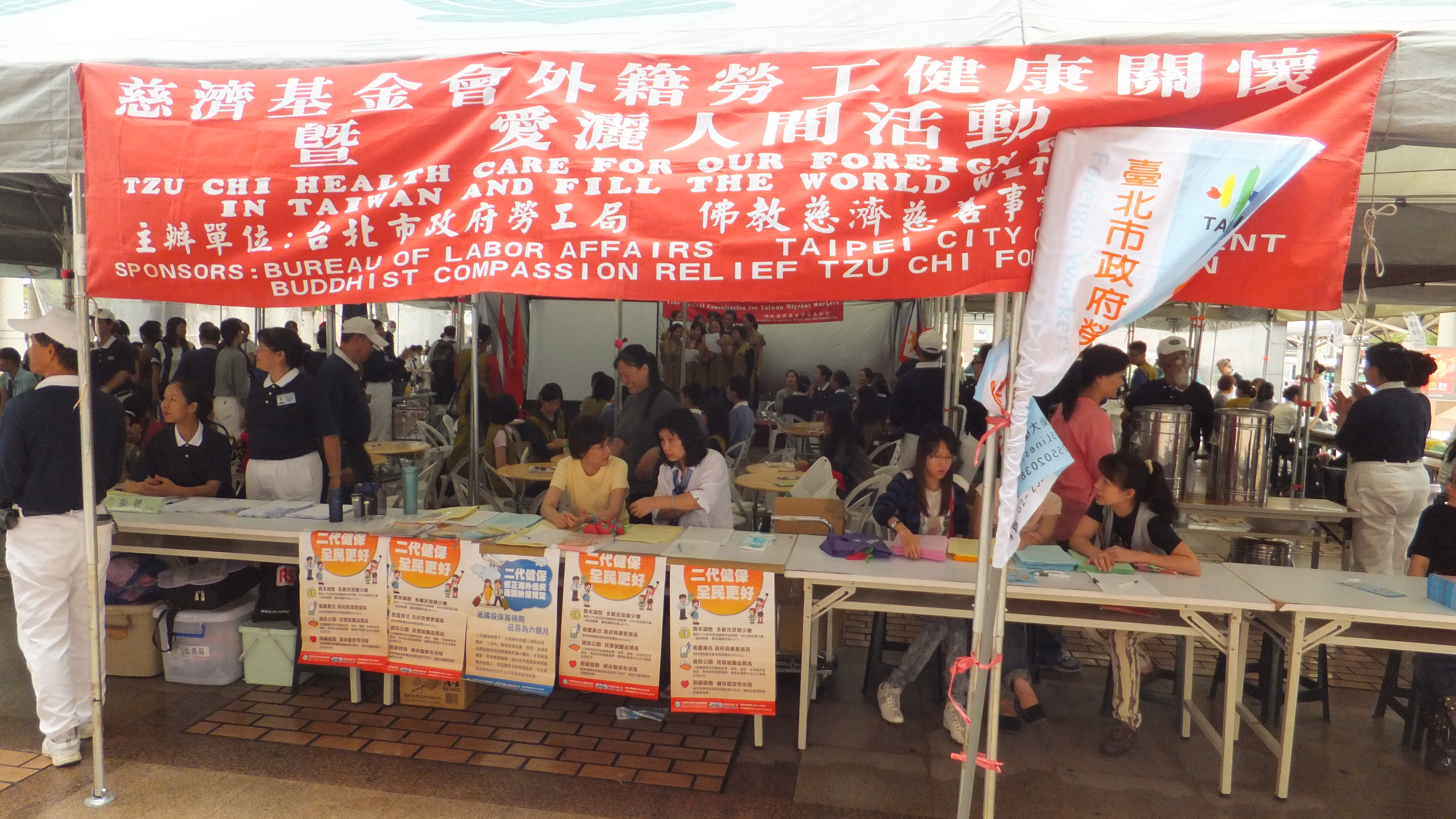
Volunteers of the Tzu Chi Foundation at a health screening event for foreign workers in Taipei

=== Doctrine and texts ===
Chinese Buddhism is a sinicized form of Mahayana Buddhism, which draws on the Chinese Buddhist canon (大藏經; Dàzàngjīng; "Great Storage of Scriptures") as well as numerous Chinese traditions. It focuses on studying Mahayana sutras and treatises and draws its main doctrines from these sources. Some of the most important scriptures in Chinese Buddhism include the Lotus Sutra, the Avatamsaka Sutra, the Vimalakirti Sutra, the Nirvana Sutra, the Amitabha Sutra, and the Surangama Sutra.

As such, Chinese Buddhism adheres to the classic Mahayana worldview, which includes a belief in many realms of existence, the existence of many Buddhas and bodhisattvas, as well as many other kinds of divine beings and ghosts. Chinese Buddhism also upholds classic Mahayana doctrines such as karma (報應) and rebirth (超生), the bodhisattva path, and the doctrines of emptiness, buddha-nature, and the one vehicle.

Chinese Buddhist philosophy contains various doctrinal traditions, the most important being the Tiantai, Huayan, Sanlun, and Weishi schools of thought. These doctrinal traditions developed their own scriptural commentaries and treatises and also various doctrinal classifications (panjiao), which hierarchically ordered the mass of Buddhist scriptures in order to advance their school's hermeneutical worldview. For example, according to master Zhiyi's "eight teachings and five periods" classification, the final and supreme teaching of the Buddha is found in the Lotus Sutra and the Nirvana Sutra. According to Huayan masters such as Fazang, the Huayan Sutra contains the supreme teaching, while the Weishi school held that the Yogachara texts are where the "third turning" of the Dharma can be found, and thus, represent the final and ultimate teaching of the Buddha.

=== Practices ===
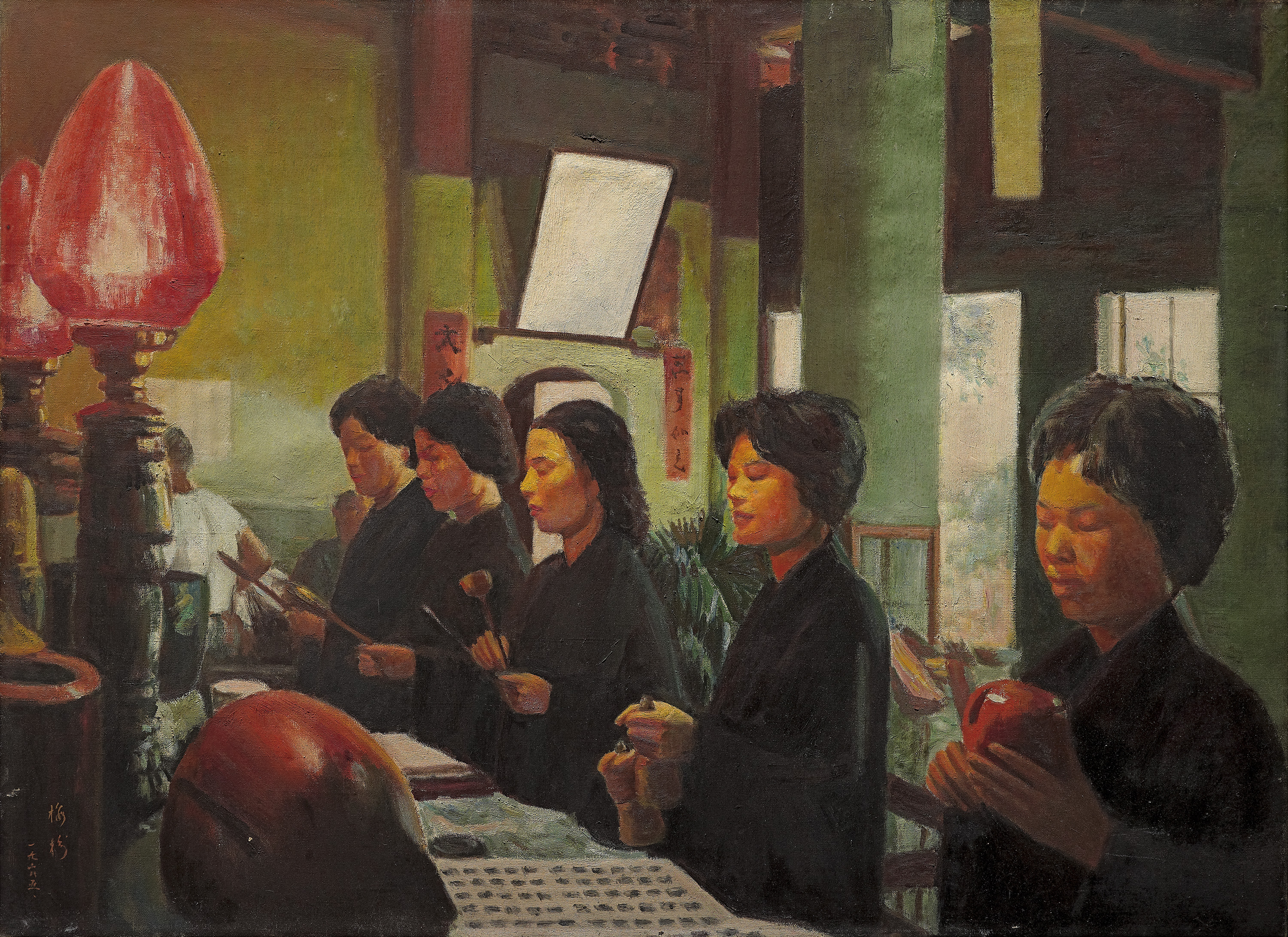
Chanting the Buddhist Scriptures, by Taiwanese painter Li Mei-shu

Chinese Buddhism contains a wide array of religious practices and observances. Ritual and devotional practices are commonly seen as generating karmic merit, which can bring about positive results in this life or the next.

According to Mario Poceski, for the vast majority of ordinary Chinese Buddhists, "prevalent expressions of Buddhist piety were (and still are) channeled via a variety of popular modes of worship and ritual observance." Many monasteries and temples typically follow a standardized traditional liturgy for daily morning and evening services, which typically involve chanting or recitation of sūtra(s) or passages from a sūtra, mantras and dhāraṇīs, gathas and verses of praises of Buddhist deities and figures, and food bestowal rites. Worship services can also include Buddhist devotional practices such as offerings to an altar (of items like incense, flowers, food, and candles), ceremonial bowing, and extensive liturgies (including repentance ceremonies, rites for good health, and memorials for the dead). According to Chün-fang Yü, the most popular Chinese Buddhist ritual performed today is the Dabei Chan, also known as the "Great Compassion Repentance", which is a repentance ritual associated with Guanyin and the Great Compassion Dharani. Another example of a popular repentance ritual is the Yaoshi Bao Chan, which is devoted to the Buddha Yaoshi (Bhaiṣajyaguru).

Adhering to sets of ethical rules, such as the classic Buddhist five precepts, is another key part of Buddhist practice. Taking up the ethical precepts in a ceremony, along with taking refuge in the three jewels (Buddha, Dharma, and Sangha), is a common way of entering the Buddhist path. Another important set of ethical precepts is the bodhisattva precepts of the Brahma's Net Sutra, which are often practiced by both laypeople and monastics. Acts of charity or social service (結緣) are also an important of part of Chinese Buddhist ethics.

Another key part of Chinese Buddhism is engaging in Buddhist meditations such as chanting the Buddha's name (nianfo), which is the core practice of Pure Land Buddhism, and seated meditation (zazen), which is the focus of the Chan tradition. The practice of recitation of the Buddha's name is commonly done in a group setting, sometimes as part of an intensive nianfo recitation retreat, which can last for several days. These retreats might also include chanting sutras, taking of the eight precepts, silent meditation, and Dharma lectures.

A major type of practice for Chinese Buddhist monastics is the performance of rituals aiming to help facilitate the nourishment and universal salvation (普渡; pǔdù) of all sentient beings in the six realms of saṃsāra. This type of ritual often involves tantric or esoteric practices and usually requires setting-up a dedicated ritual space, invoking the Buddhist pantheon, and the transference of merit from the performance of the ritual. A few examples of this type are the Yujia Yankou rite and the Shuilu Fahui ceremony.

Textual practices are also commonly practiced by monks and laypeople. These include printing, copying, propagating, and reciting Buddhist scriptures, studying Buddhist texts, and attending lectures. Buddhist temples may also have special elements associated with sacred texts, such as lecture halls or dharma halls, libraries, and scripture platforms (施法壇), a kind of sacred podium.

Other important Buddhist rituals are those related to death, which is seen as a key moment for Buddhists who want to be reborn in the pure land of a Buddha (the most popular being Amitabha's pure land). The focus of these rituals is to keep the dying person free of distractions and offer spiritual support (so they can focus their minds on Amitabha through the repetition of the Buddha's name). It is commonly believed that during these rituals one can experience auspicious signs, such as visions of Amitabha and bright lights.

Pilgrimages to well-known monasteries and sites, such as the Four Sacred Buddhist Mountains (Mount Wutai, Mount Emei, Mount Jiuhua, and Mount Putuo) are undertaken by monastics and lay practitioners alike.

Another popular practice is the use of mantras and dharanis. A few examples include the Mahā Karuṇā Dhāraṇī, the Uṣṇīṣa Vijaya Dhāraṇī, the Śūraṅgama mantra, the Ucchuṣma mantra, the Ekādaśamukha mantra, and the Cundī Dhāraṇī, which is one of the Ten Small Mantras that are regularly chanted as part of standard morning and evening liturgical services. Robert Gimello has also observed that in Chinese Buddhist communities, the esoteric practices of Cundī enjoyed popularity among both the common people and the elite.

=== Deities and temples ===
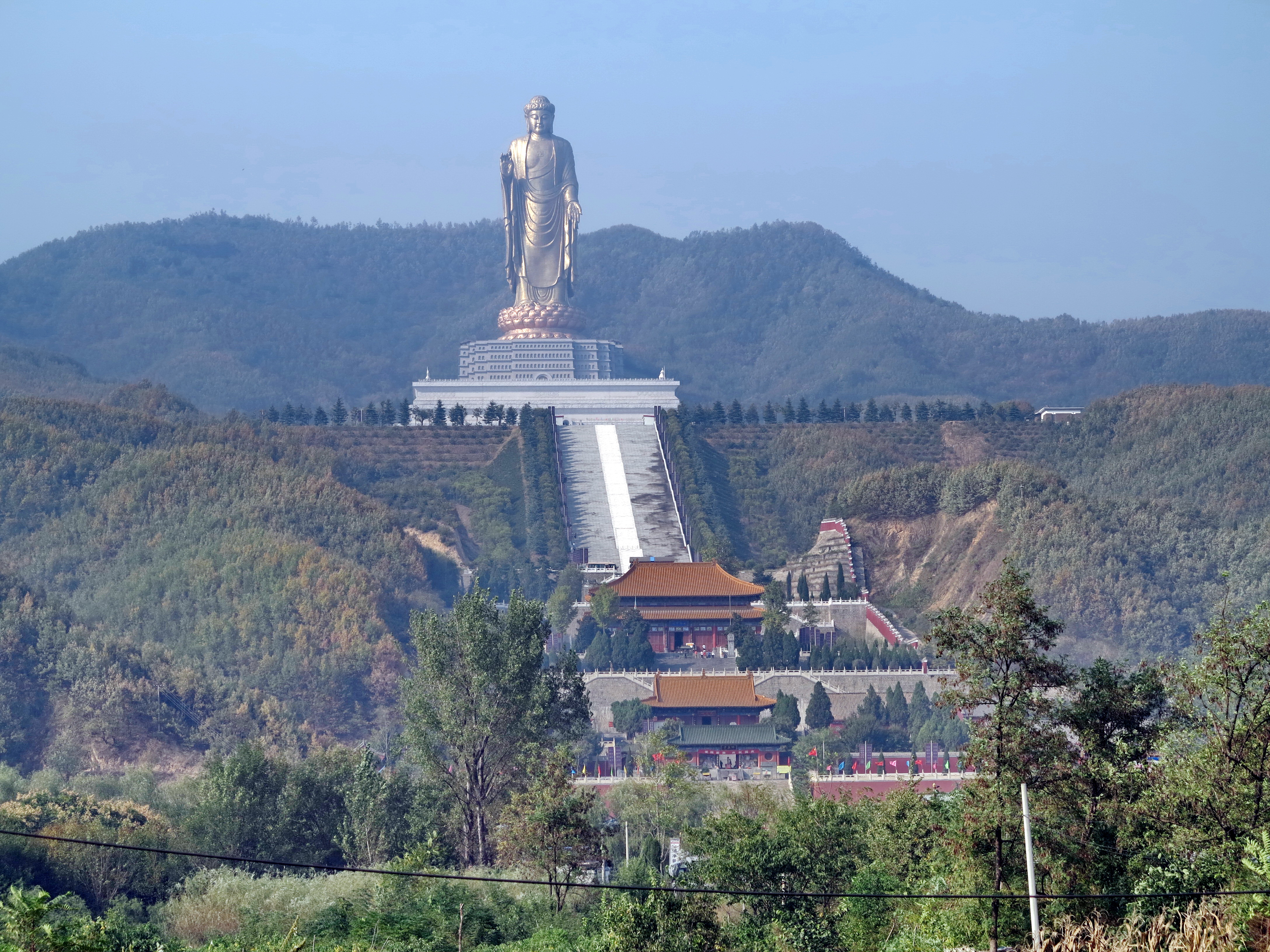
The Spring Temple Buddha, a colossal statue of Vairocana, in Henan, China

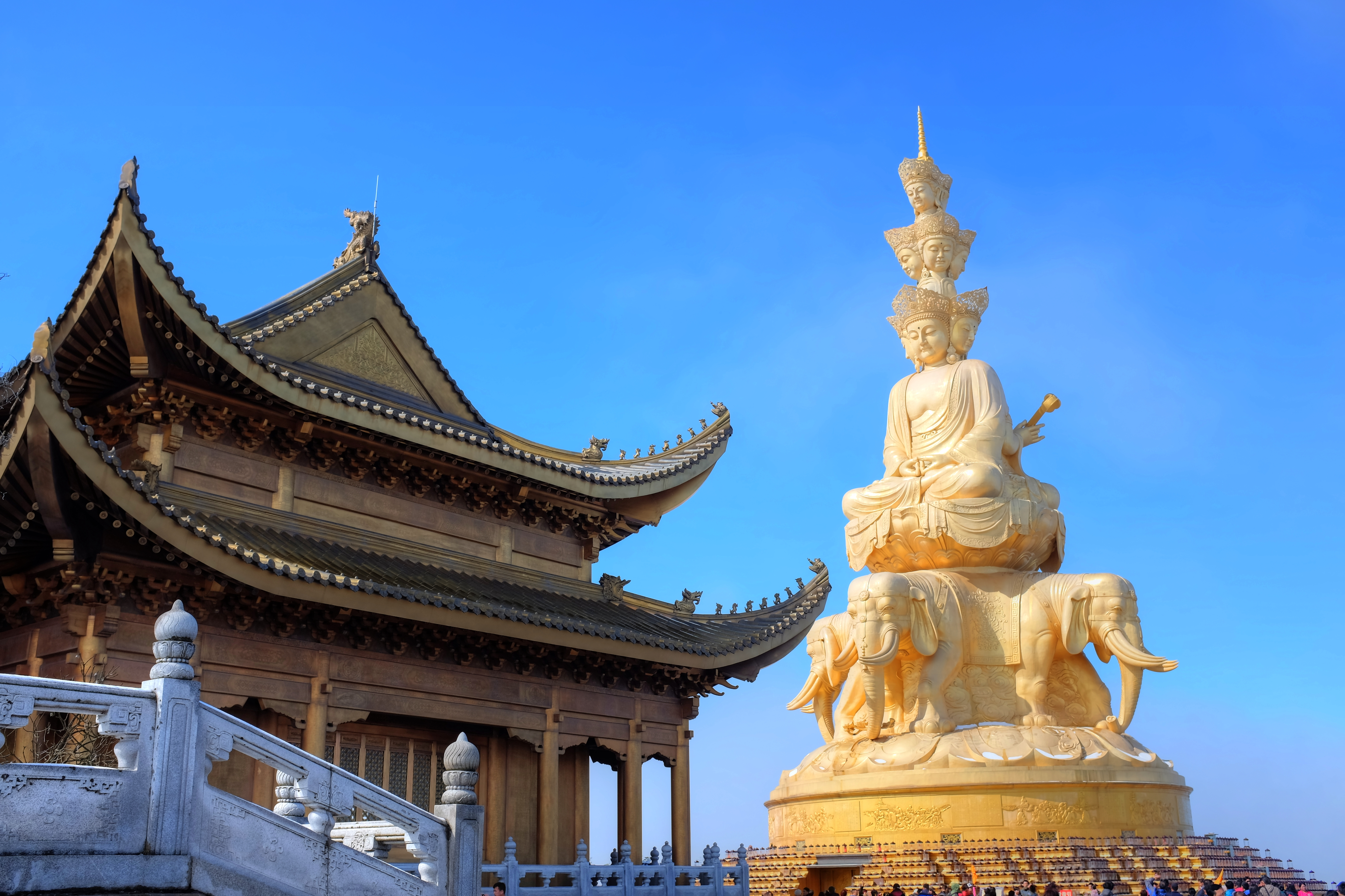
Statue of Samantabhadra at Mount Emei

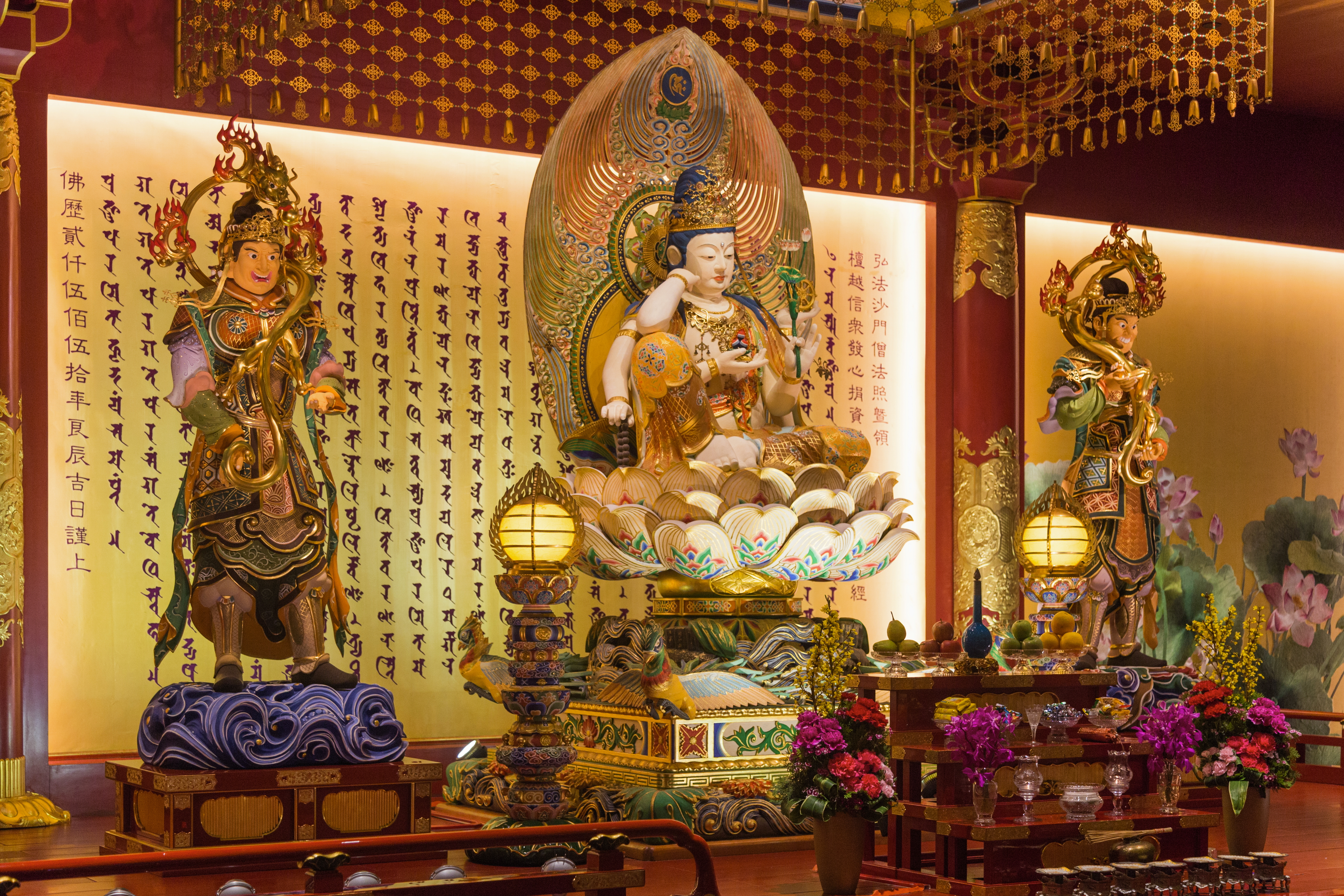
Shrine to Cintāmaṇicakra within the Universal Wisdom Hall of the Buddha Tooth Relic Temple and Museum, Singapore

Various Mahayana Buddhist deities are venerated in Chinese Buddhism, most of which are Buddhas and bodhisattvas. Some of the key figures include:

- Shijiamouni (釋迦摩尼; Shìjiāmóní), or Śākyamuni ("sage of the Śākyas"), the historical founder of Buddhism, commonly depicted with Ānanda and Mahākāśyapa, or in a triad with Amituofo and Yaoshi Fo.
- The Five Tathāgatas (五方佛; Wǔfāngfó), an esoteric grouping of Five Buddhas who are commonly invoked in rituals such as the Yujia Yankou.
- Guanyin (觀音; Guānyīn), the bodhisattva of compassion who has various forms (such as the thousand arms form) and is the East Asian version of the bodhisattva Avalokiteśvara.
- Amituofo (阿彌陀佛; Āmítuó Fó), or Amitābha ('Limitless Light'), also called Amitāyus ('Limitless Life'), associated with the pure land of Sukhavati, which many hope to reach after death.
- Dari Rulai (大日如來; Dàrì Rúlái), or Vairocana, the cosmic primordial Buddha .
- Yaoshi Fo (藥師佛; Yàoshī Fó), or Bhaiṣajyaguru, associated with medicinal powers.
- Mi Le (彌勒菩薩; Mílè púsà), or Maitreya, is seen as the Buddha of the future, sometimes depicted as the monk Budai.
- Wenshu (文殊; Wénshū), or Mañjuśrī, the bodhisattva of wisdom, associated with Mount Wutai, who often appears mounted on a lion.
- Puxian (普賢; Pǔxián), or Samantabhadra, often depicted riding an elephant, is associated with confession and repentance rites and the bodhisattva vows.
- Dizang (地藏; Dìzàng), or Kṣitigarbha, the savior monk associated with rites for the deceased.
- Budong Mingwang (不動明王; Bùdòng Míngwáng), or Acala, a manifestation of Vairocana.
- Huiji Jingang (穢跡金剛; Huìjì Jīngāng), or Ucchuṣma, a manifestation of Śākyamuni.
- The Eighteen Arhats (十八羅漢; Shíbā Luóhàn), disciples of Gautama Buddha.
- The Four Great Heavenly Kings (四大天王; Sìdà Tiānwáng).
- The Twenty-Four Protective Deities (二十四諸天; Èrshísì Zhūtiān), a common set of protector deities (dharmapalas).
- The Ten Wisdom Kings (十大明王; Shídà Míngwáng), another common set of dharmapalas.

Chinese Buddhist temples usually include numerous images and statues of Buddhas and bodhisattvas. They are often ritually carved and installed as part of a consecration ritual that may include chanting and scripture reading. Devotion towards these images is a major part of Chinese Buddhism. As Chün-fang Yü writes, "people in China worship Buddhas and bodhisattvas in rituals, write poems and novels about them, praise them in songs and hymns, and tell stories and stage plays about them. And above all else, they worship the images of these holy beings."

According to Mario Poceski, Chinese Buddhist temples generally follow a traditional Chinese palace layout:

"[Buddhist temples] consist of a series of halls and courtyards that are arranged symmetrically around a central axis, which usually runs from north to south. The main hall is typically a large building that is centrally located along the main axis. In larger monasteries or temples, a number of ancillary halls also house the images of lesser Buddhist divinities, giving residents and visitors alike a wide choice of objects of worship and supplication."

Another common structure is a pagoda, which may contain Buddhist relics and statues or images of Buddhas and bodhisattvas.

=== Monasticism ===
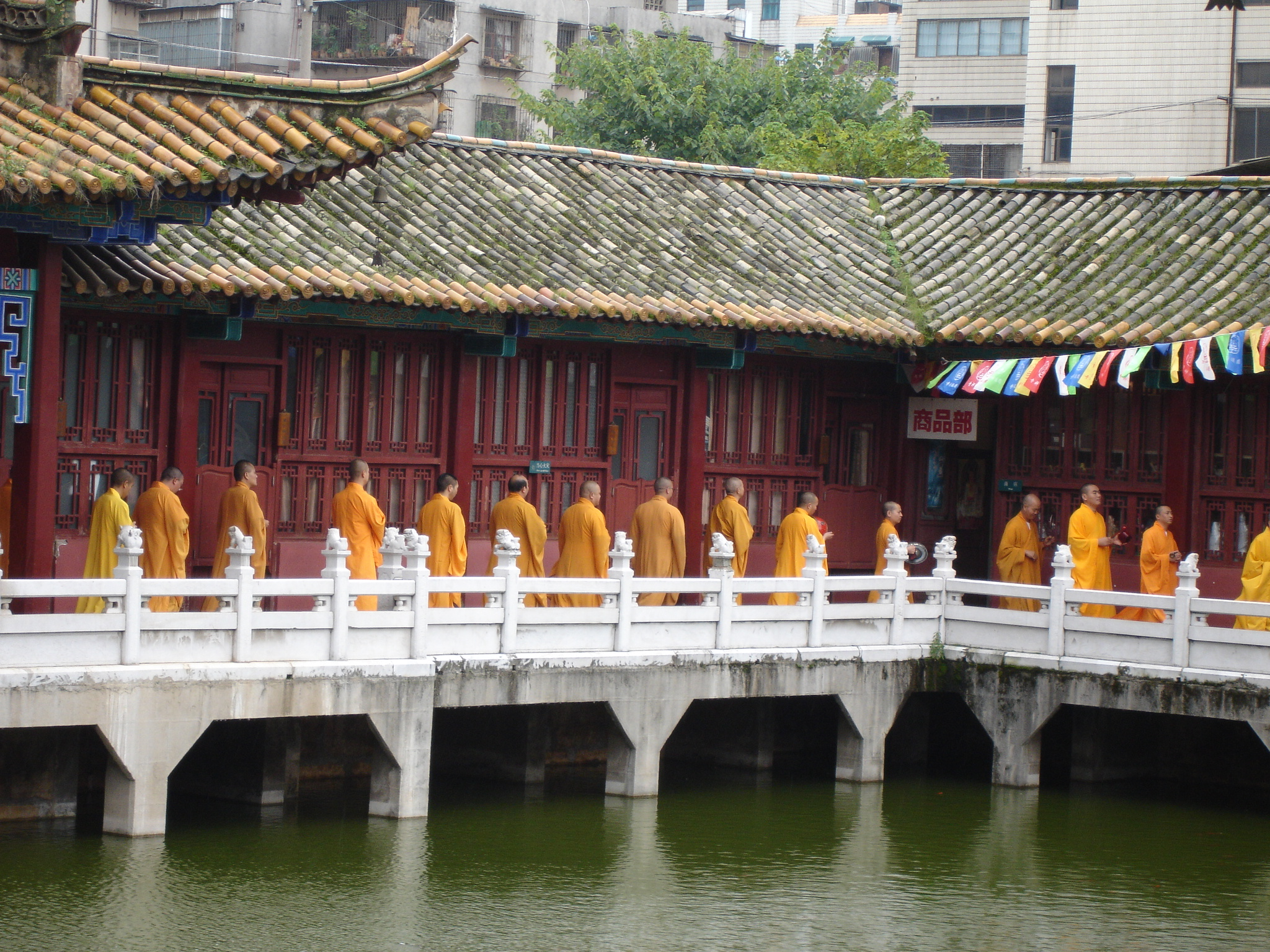
Buddhist Monks at Kunming Yuantong Temple

Buddhist monasticism is an important part of Chinese Buddhism. Both male and female monastics follow the Dharmaguptaka of Vinaya, which is known as the Four Part Vinaya (Sifen lü ) in China and has 250 rules for monks and 348 for nuns.

Buddhist monks and nuns perform numerous religious practices and services, including offerings to altars, liturgical services, circumambulating the Buddha hall, preaching the scriptures, giving Dharma lectures, ritual meals, and chanting at mealtime, as well as confession and repentance rituals.

There have been many different types of monasteries throughout Chinese Buddhist history. There are city monasteries, country monasteries, and monasteries deep in the mountains. Some monasteries may be large and rich, with thousands of monastics, while others are small with just a few monastics. The most prestigious monasteries have support from rich elites, and the smallest are usually in small villages.

=== Vegetarianism and veganism ===
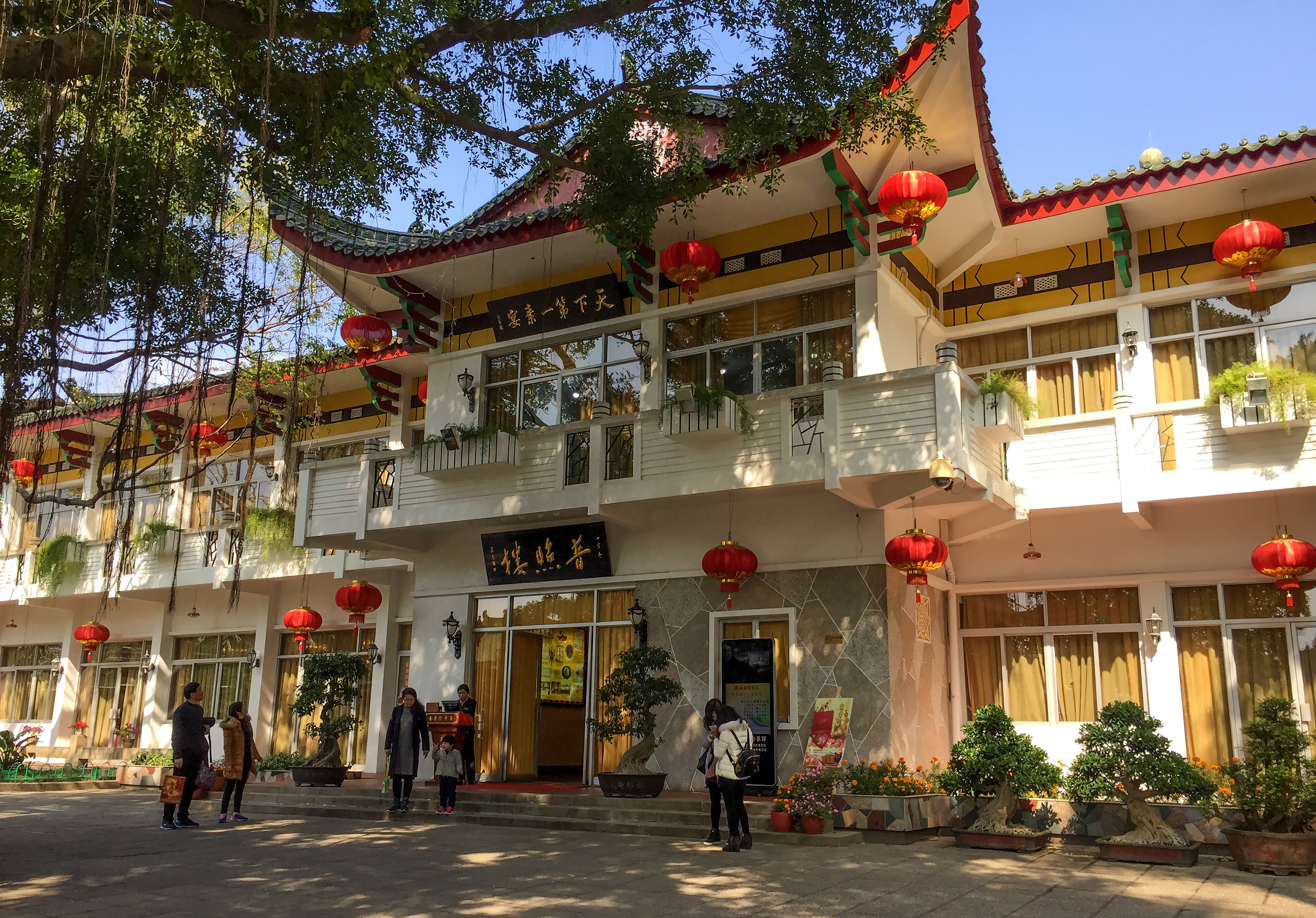
The vegetarian dining hall at South Putuo Temple is well known throughout China

The Chinese word 純淨素 (chún jìng sù), meaning 'pure Buddhist vegan/vegetarian', is widely used in Chinese Buddhism. Such dietary practice is promoted in various Mahayana sutras, such as the Lankavatara Sutra (楞伽阿跋多羅寶經; léngqié ābáduōluó bǎojīng).

Monastics are often required to be vegetarian or vegan, and other animal products are often banned in Buddhist temples and monasteries. Other dietary restrictions may include avoiding eggs, dairy, and the five types of pungent vegetables.

Devout laypeople are also often vegetarian. Some may practice being vegetarian on certain sacred days, during religious retreats, or during certain festivals.

Temples and monasteries often have vegetarian dining halls, and vegetarian feasts are a common feature of popular celebrations.

=== Laypeople ===
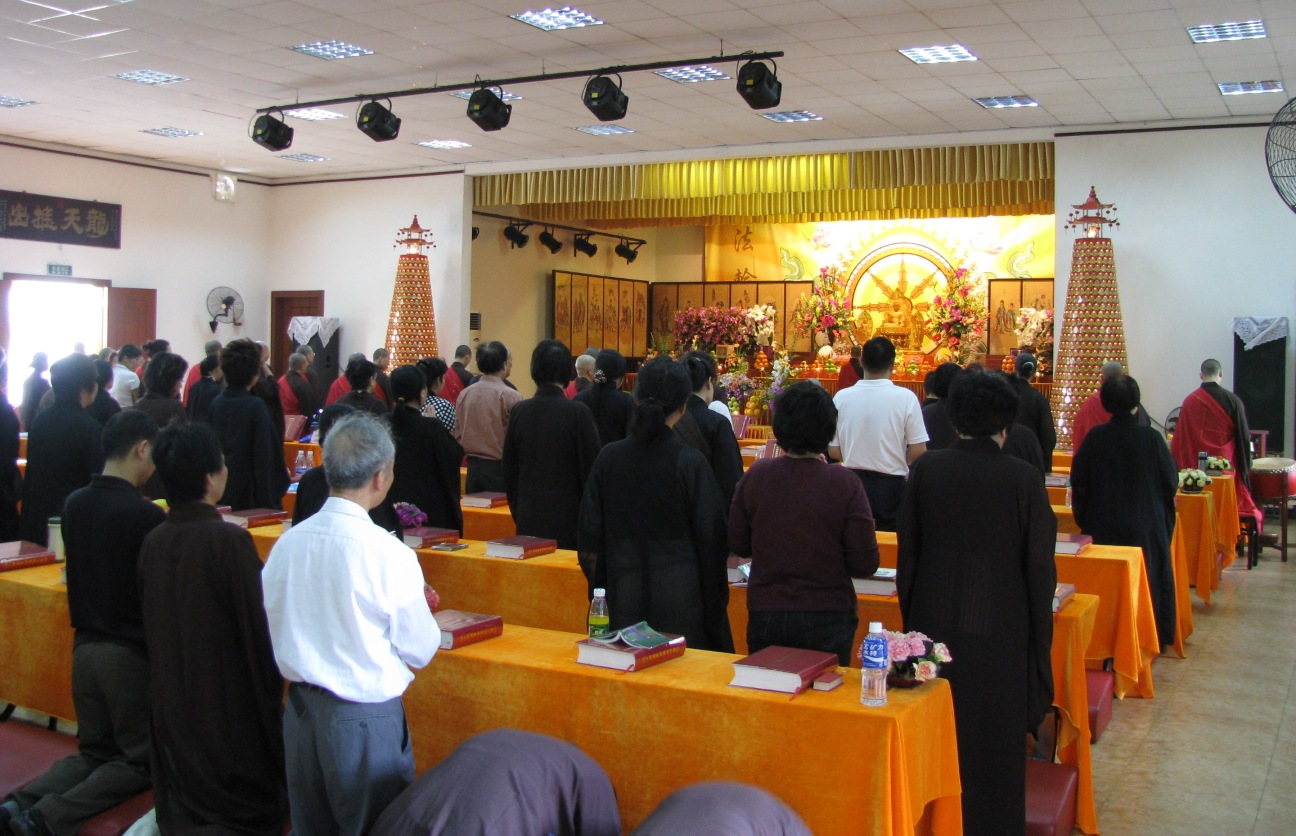
Lay Buddhists at the recitation hall of the Temple of the Six Banyan Trees in Guangzhou.

In Chinese Buddhism, lay Buddhist practitioners have traditionally played an important role, and lay practice of Buddhism in China has had similar tendencies to those of monastic Buddhism. Many historical biographies of lay Buddhists are available, which give a clear picture of their practices and role in Chinese Buddhism. In addition to these numerous biographies, there are accounts from Jesuit missionaries, such as Matteo Ricci, which provide extensive and revealing accounts of the degree Buddhism penetrated elite and popular culture in China.

Traditional practices—such as meditation, mantra recitation, mindfulness of Amitābha Buddha, asceticism, and vegetarianism—were all integrated into the belief systems of ordinary people. It is known from accounts from the time of the Ming dynasty that lay practitioners often engaged in practices from both the Pure Land and Chan traditions, as well as the study of the Buddhist sutras. The Heart Sutra and the Diamond Sutra were the most popular, followed by the Lotus Sutra and the Avatamsaka Sutra.

=== Syncretism and multiple religious belonging ===
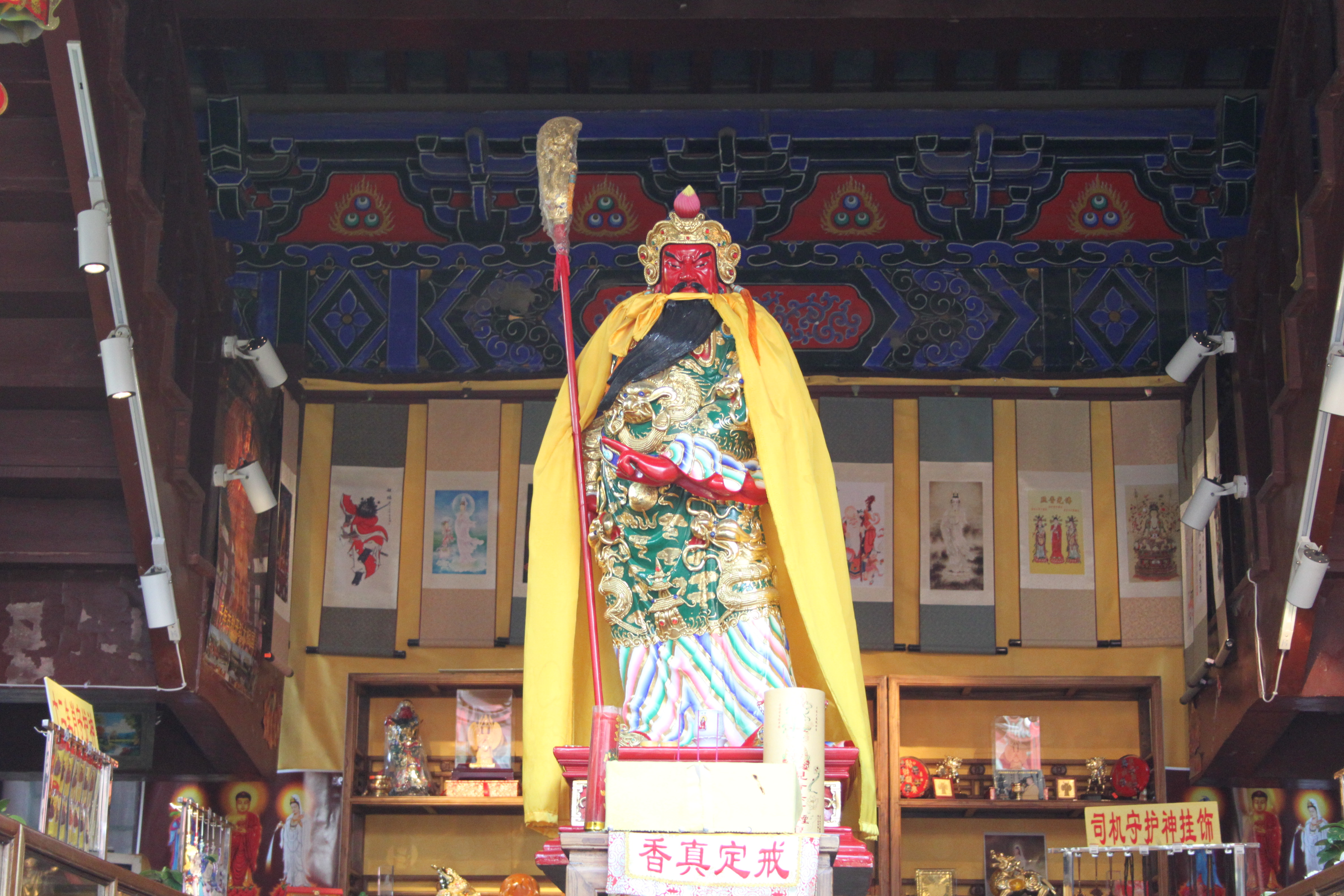
A statue of Guan Yu at Daxiangguo Temple

Chinese Buddhism also includes influences from native Chinese religions, including Confucianism, Taoism, and Chinese folk religion. This ecumenical attitude and embrace of religious pluralism has been a common feature of Chinese culture since ancient times. For example, Chinese Buddhists may practice qigong, tai chi, and gongfu, venerate native deities (such as Guan Yu, Mazu, and the Monkey King), engage in ancestor veneration, practice traditional medicine, and make use of feng shui and Chinese talismans. Chinese religions such as Taoism and Confucianism were also, in turn, influenced by Buddhism.

The idea of the compatibility of the three teachings (Confucianism, Buddhism, and Taoism) is common in China and is expressed in the phrase the three teachings harmonious as one (三敎合一; sānjiào héyī). Chinese Buddhism developed mythologies and philosophies that incorporated and accommodated Chinese religions. For example, apocryphal texts tell of how Laozi was actually a disciple of the Buddha and how Confucius was a bodhisattva. Chinese Buddhist thinkers such as Guifeng Zongmi argued that all three teachings should be followed and practiced since they all contain important truths (though he considered Buddhism to reveal the highest truth).

One such important element of Chinese Buddhism is that religious practices focus on one's ancestors, something that is shared in common with other traditional Chinese religions. This can include paying respect to them at various sites and at festivals such as the Qingming and Zhong Yuan festivals, as well as participating in services to pray for one's deceased ancestors.

The ritual burning of incense (shaoxiang, jingxiang) is another common religious practice in Buddhist spaces derived from traditional Chinese religion. During the Zhou dynasty, the Chinese believed that smoke resulting from the burning of sandalwood would act as a bridge between the human world and the spirits. The practice remains a common offering in Chinese Buddhism, which it shares with other Chinese religions.

Another common feature of Chinese religion is multiple religious belonging. As such, Chinese adherents may practice Buddhism alongside other Chinese religious practices without seeing this as conflicting. According to Mario Poceski:

Many or even most people who actually come to worship at Buddhist temples are not hardcore believers. A good number of them assume the kinds of fuzzy or hybrid religious identities that are typical of Chinese religiosity; among other things, that can mean that many of them also worship at Daoist temples or shrines associated with popular religion. This is one of the reasons why it is very difficult to arrive at reliable data about the number of Buddhists in China.

During the Tang and Yuan dynasties, Chinese Buddhism was also in proximity to Chinese branches of the Church of the East and Christianity in general, and competed with these traditions, especially during the Tang dynasty. Chinese Tibetan and Mongolian Buddhism were also significantly influenced by them, as Mongolian Buddhism, influenced by Nestorian beliefs, and Tibetan Buddhism spread out during the Yuan dynasty. The three Buddhist traditions also heavily influenced each other.

== Traditions ==
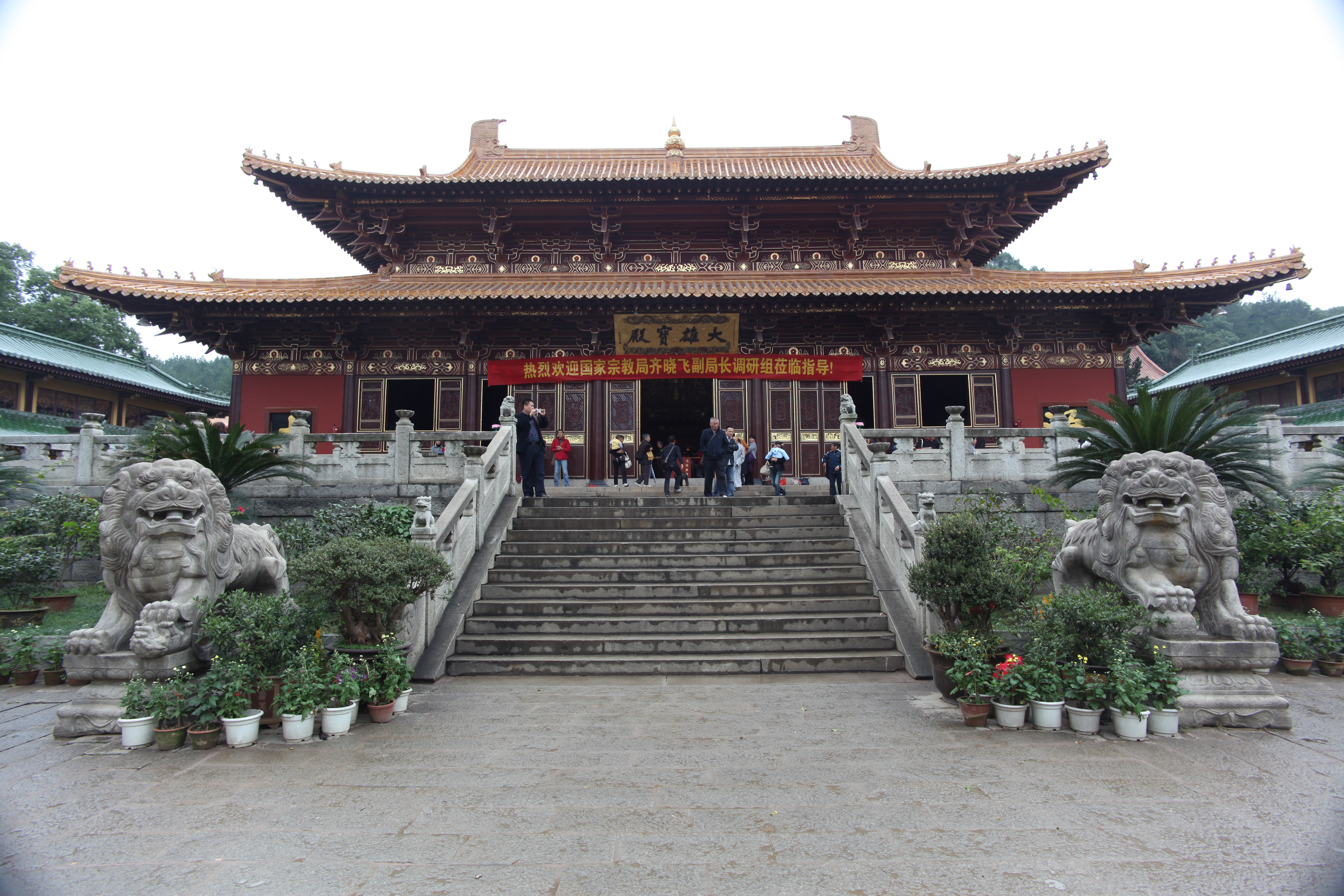
Donglin Temple at Mount Lu, considered the birthplace of Pure Land Buddhism

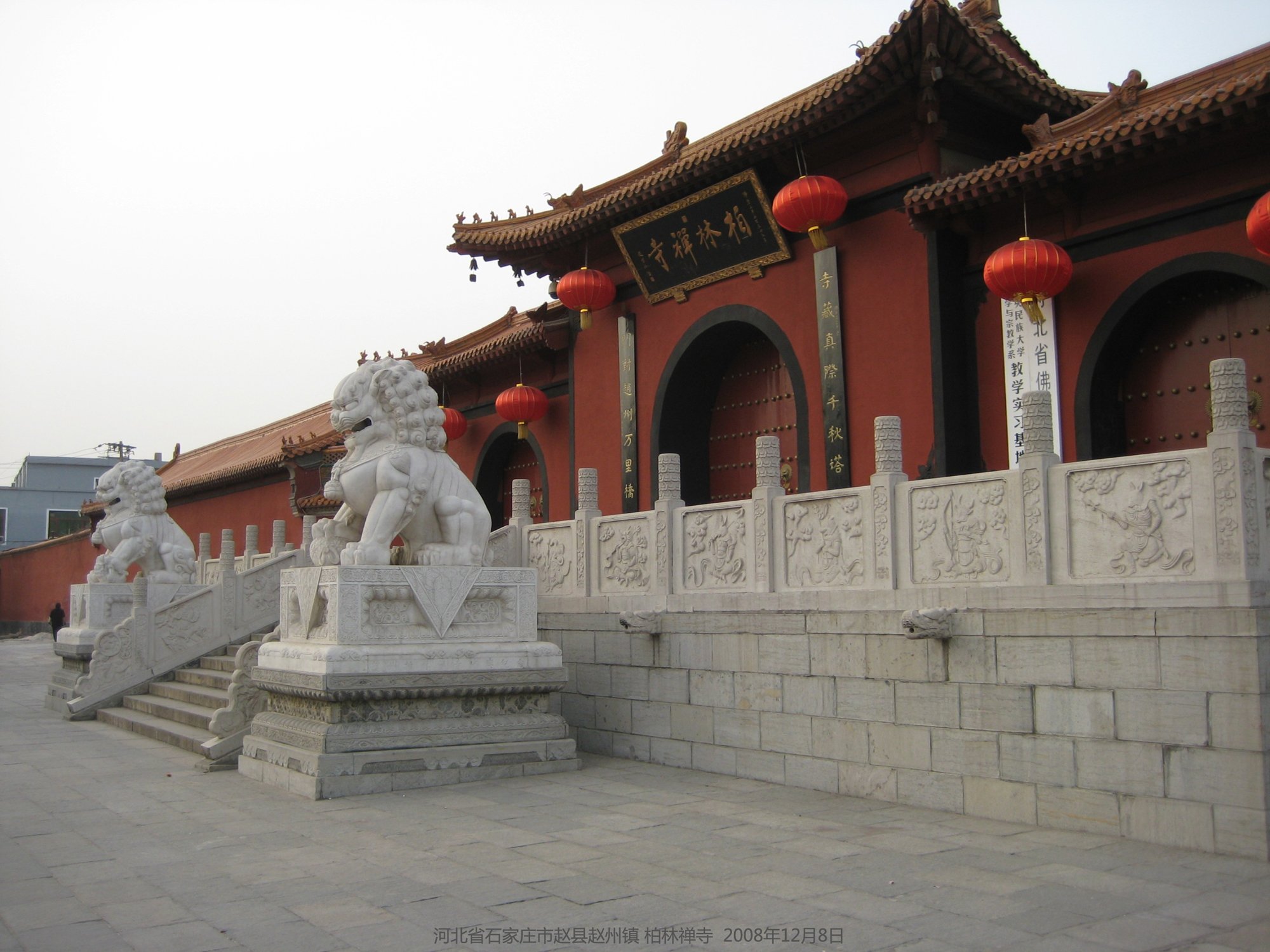
Bailin Temple (Hebei), a Chinese Chan temple

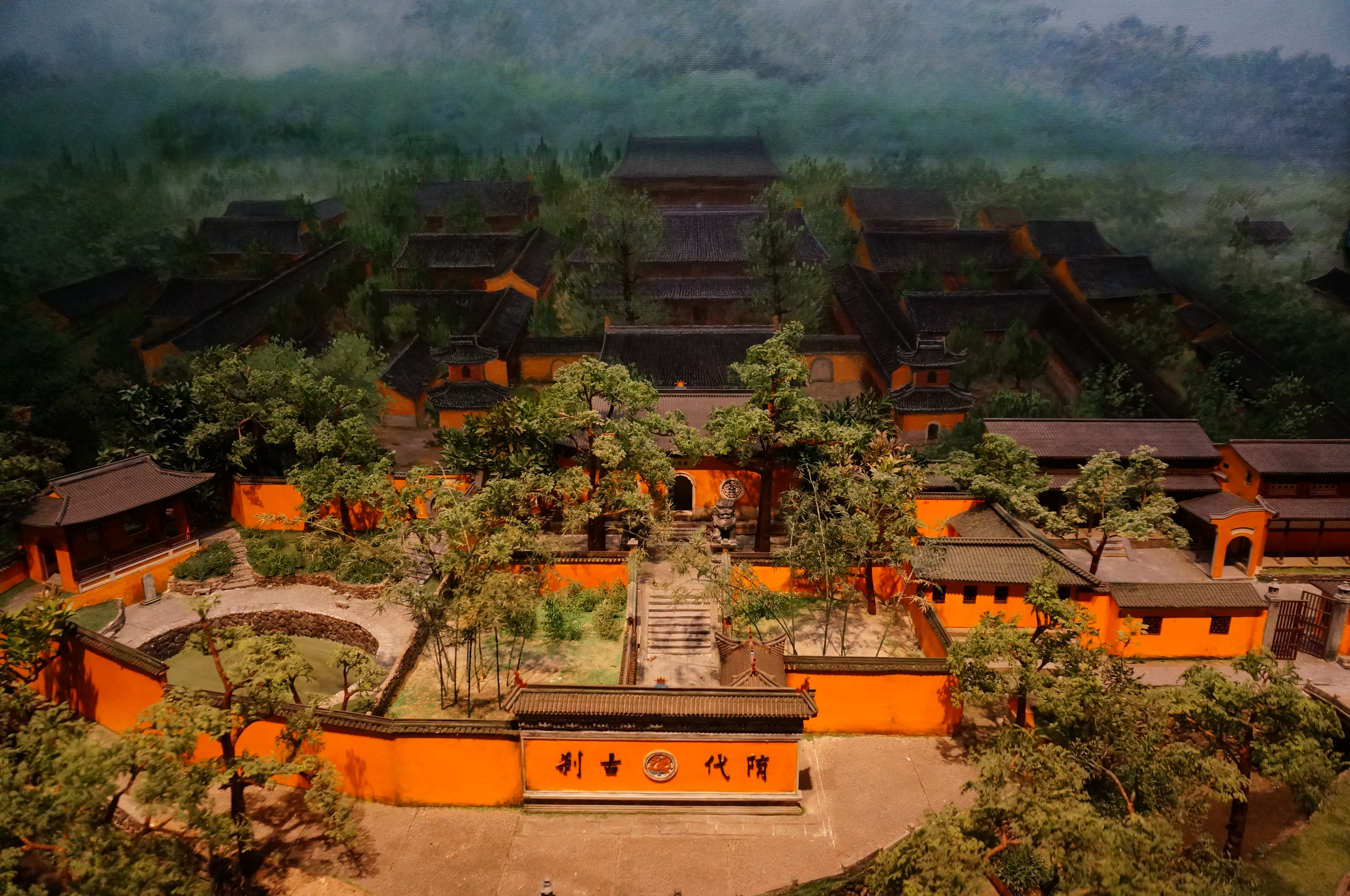
A model of Guoqing Temple, a center of the Tiantai school

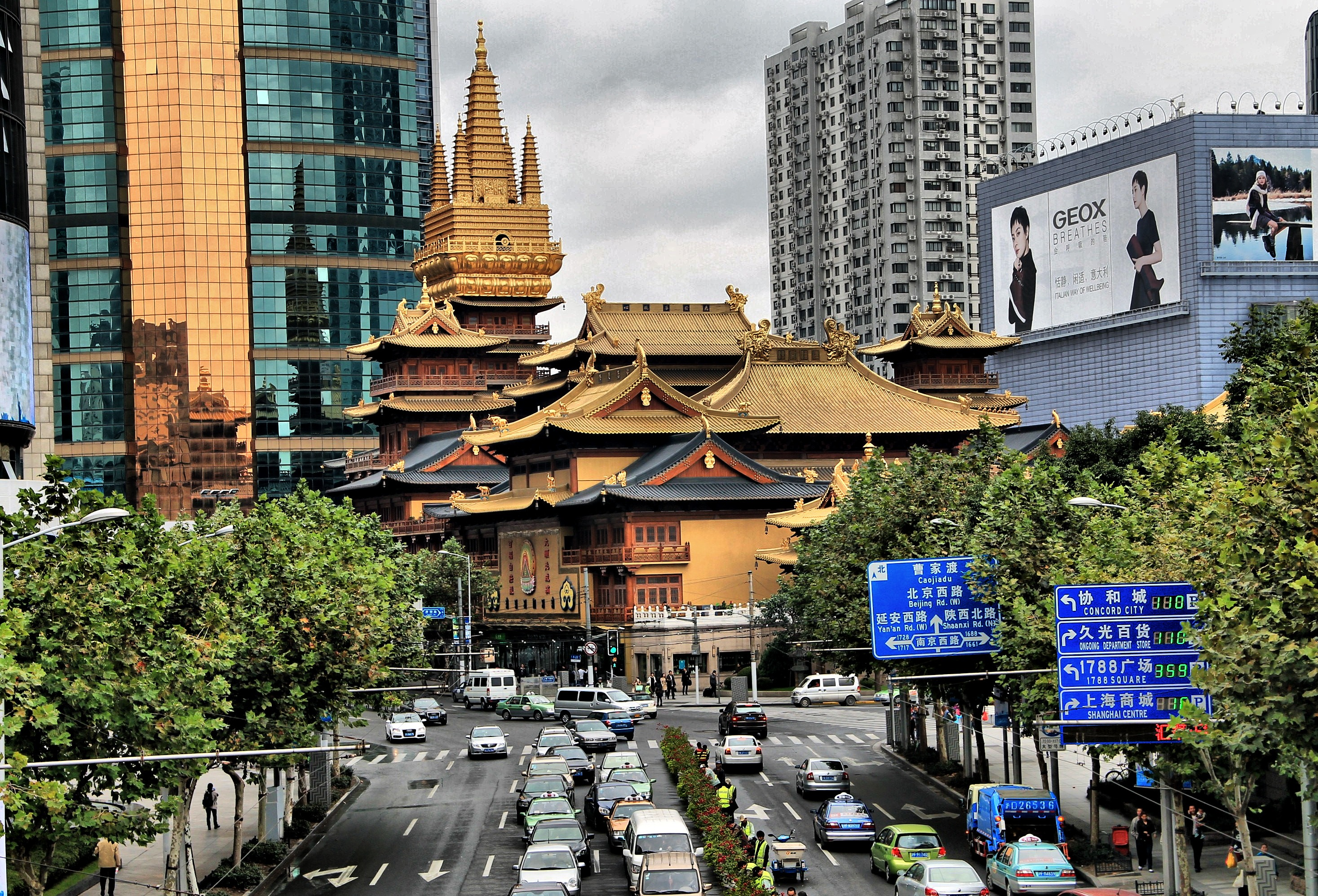
The Jing'an Temple in Shanghai, a modern Zhenyan temple revived through Japanese Shingon

=== Major traditions ===
Traditional Chinese Buddhist scholars such as Sheng-yen enumerate thirteen Buddhist traditions or schools (zōng). This list is also found in traditional Japanese Buddhist histories, particularly that of Gyōnen (1240–1321).

Over time, some of these schools survived or were revived as living traditions, while others are now defunct historical traditions or were absorbed into other schools. These traditions are not rigid designations and there has always been much intermixing, and many temples and communities are influenced by many of these traditions (and also by local Chinese custom and traditional Chinese religions such as Taoism). Some traditions may also have numerous sub-schools or sects.

The various Chinese Buddhist traditions are not exclusivist, and are better seen as trends, emphases, schools of thought, or dharma-gates (法門; fǎmén), instead of as separate sects. Chün-fang Yü quotes a famous saying that describes the harmonious situation in Chinese Buddhism, "Tiantai and Huayan for doctrine, Chan and Pure Land for practice."

As Mario Poceski notes, Chinese Buddhism "lacks clear sectarian divisions of the kind we find in other Buddhist traditions". All Chinese monastics follow the same ordination procedures and monastic precepts; and, as such, there is no rigid separation between schools or sects. While traditions such as Chan and Tiantai are understood as distinctive teachings, they are all part of the single Chinese Buddhist tradition, which is "characterized by broad-minded acceptance of a variety of styles of discourse, modes of worship, and approaches to spiritual cultivation." Due to the religion's acceptance of diversity, ecumenism, and difference, most Chinese Buddhists would not identify themselves as being part of a specific school. However, there are still disagreements and doctrinal debates within the community.

The thirteen schools are:

- The Chengshi school (historical), which focused on the study of the Tattvasiddhi-Śāstra ("The Treatise that Accomplishes Reality"; 成實論; Chengshilun).
- The Kosa School (俱舍宗) (historical), based on the study of Abhidharma using the Abhidharmakośa of Vasubandhu.
- The Three Treatises school (三論; Sānlùn; Chinese Madhyamaka), founded by Kumarajiva (344–413 CE).
- The Pure Land school.
- The Nirvana School (historical), based on the Mahāyāna Mahāparinirvāṇa Sūtra translated by Dharmarakṣa (c. 233–310); this was later absorbed into the Tiantai school.
- The Dilun school (based on the Daśabhūmikā sutra translated by Bodhiruci); this was later absorbed into the Huayan tradition.
- The Shelun school (based on Asanga's Summary of the Mahayana translated by Paramartha); it was later absorbed into the Huayan and Consciousness-only schools.
- The Consciousness-Only school (唯識宗; Wéishí, Yogachara), a.k.a. Faxiang ('dharma characteristics') school, founded by Xuanzang (602–664) and based on his Cheng Weishi Lun ("The Demonstration of Consciousness-only").
- The Tiantai school, also known as the Lotus school, due to their focus on the Lotus Sutra.
- The Huayan school, the school of the Avatamsaka Sutra.
- The Vinaya school or Nanshan school, a historical tradition that focused on the Dharmaguptaka monastic discipline, established by the monk Daoxuan (596–667).
- The Chan (Dhyana) school, i.e. the Zen tradition attributed to the founder Bodhidharma, which focuses on sitting meditation (zuòchán) and developed numerous sub-schools such as Caodong and Linji.
- The Zhenyan school (真言宗; 'true word'; "mantra school"), i.e., Chinese Esoteric Buddhism, also called Mìjiao (密教; "Esoteric Teaching"), Mìzōng (密宗; "Esoteric Tradition"), or Tángmì (唐密; "Tang Esoterica").

Many of these traditions were later exported to other East Asian nations, such as Japan, Korea, and Vietnam.

According to Sheng-yen, the Chan school is the most popular school in China today, and it is often eclectically combined with the other traditions of Pure Land, Tiantai, Huayan, Three Treatises, Consciousness-Only, Vinaya, and Esoteric.

There is also a modernist movement called Humanistic Buddhism, which emphasizes humanism, charity, and other humanitarian practices that help improve social conditions.

=== New religious movements ===
There are many sects and organizations proclaiming a Buddhist identity and pursuit (fo or fu: 'awakening', 'enlightenment') that are not recognized as legitimate Buddhism by the Chinese Buddhist Association and the Chinese government. These groups include:

- Guanyin Buddhism [Awakening Teaching] (观音佛教; Guānyīn Fójiào) or Guanyin Church (观音会; Guānyīn Huì)
- True Buddha School
- Buddhism [Awakening Teaching] of the Lord of Heaven of Infinite Thriving of the Mountain of Longevity (寿山万隆天主佛教; Shòushān Wànlóng Tiānzhǔ Fójiào)
- Wulian Jingang Dadao ('Great Way of the Innumerable Attendants of Awakening')
- Hanmi Chinese Esoteric Buddhism, Living Buddha Dechan Jueren

== Holidays and festivals ==
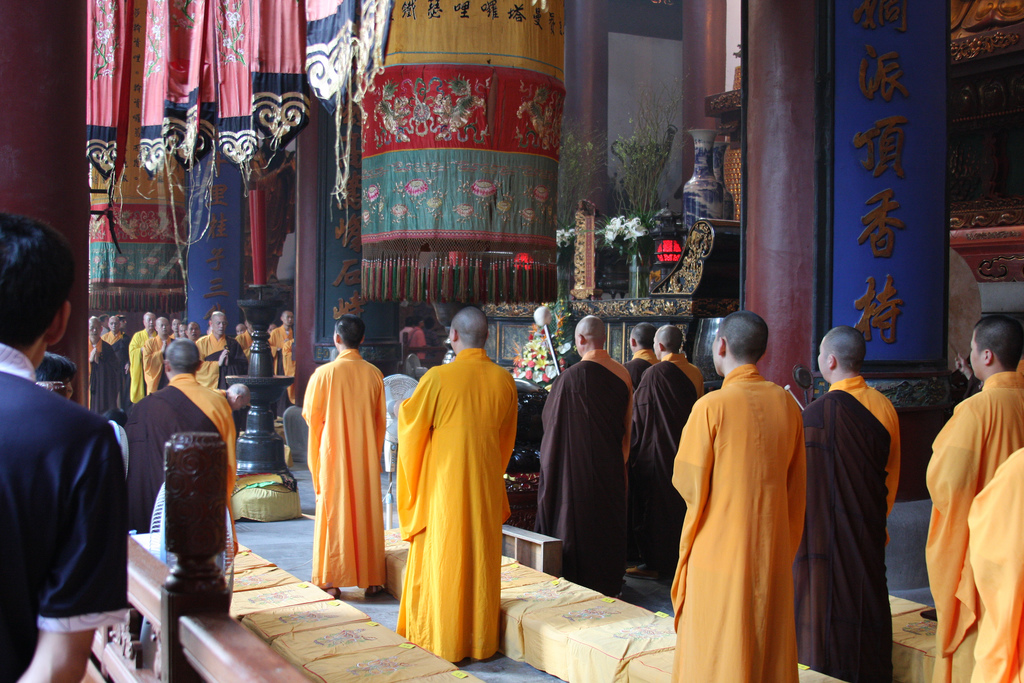
Traditional Buddhist ceremony in Hangzhou, Zhejiang

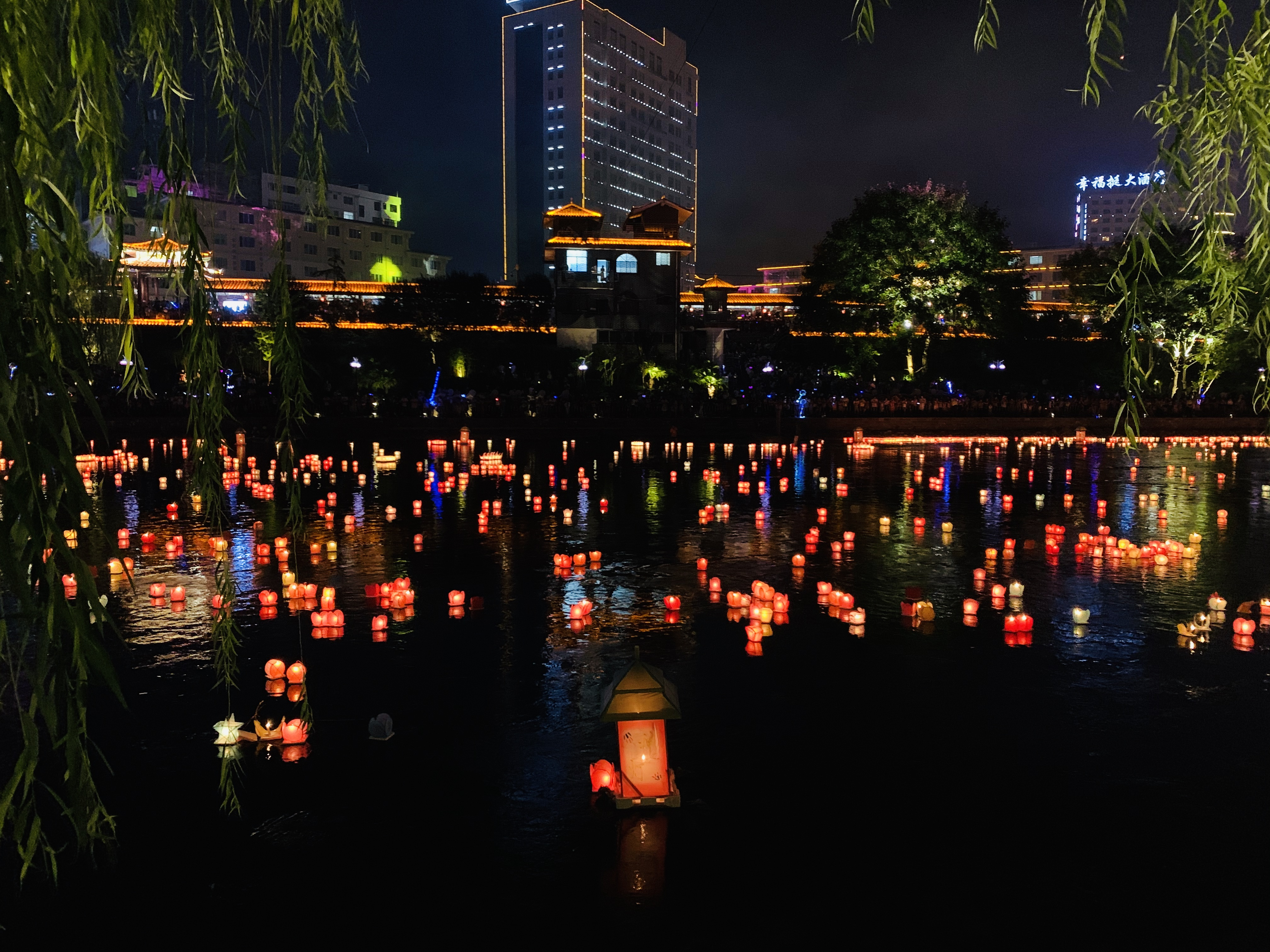
Ghost festival floating lanterns, Hong Kong

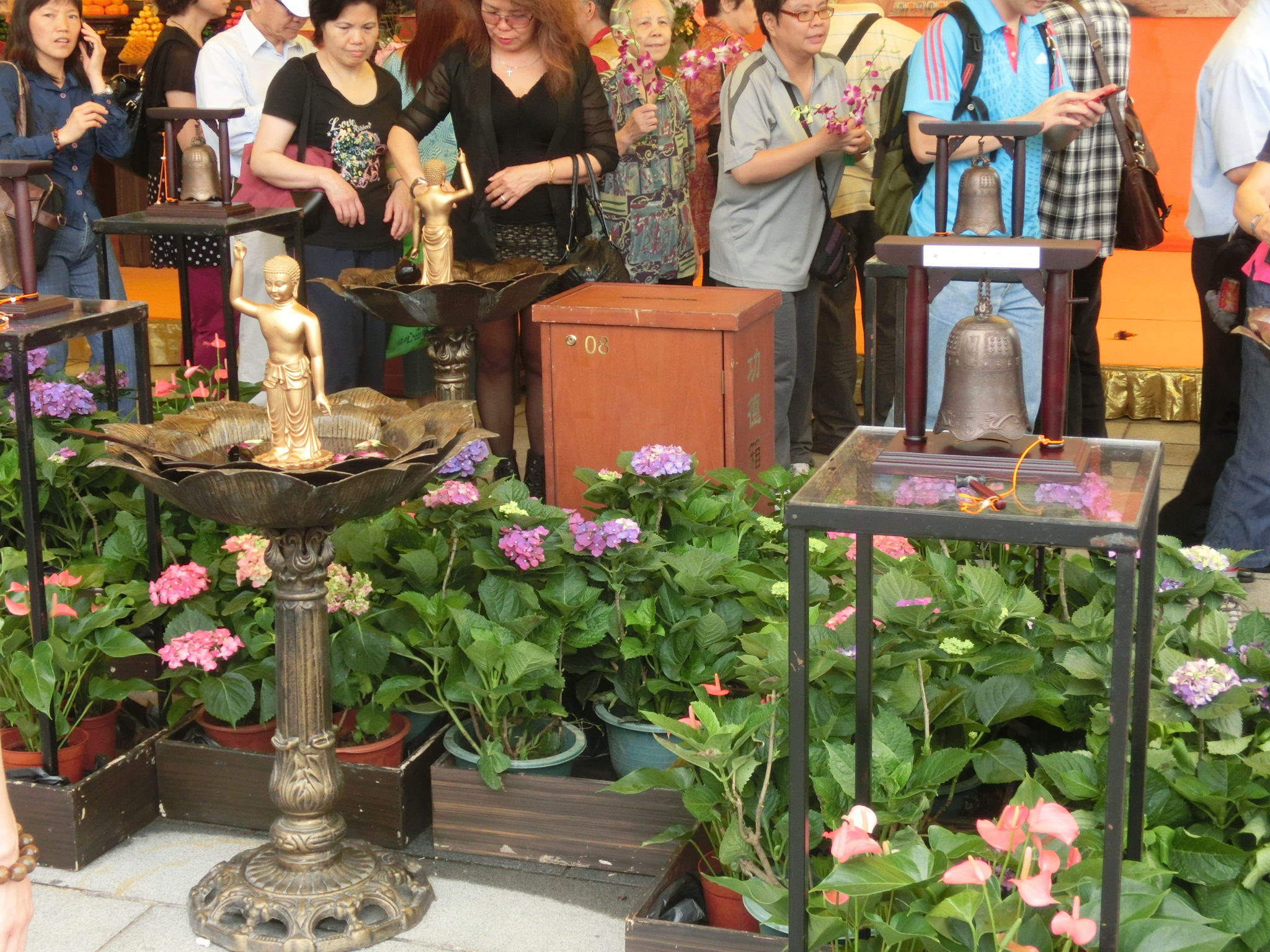
Buddha's Birthday celebration of bathing baby Buddha statues

Chinese Buddhists celebrate numerous religious festivals and holidays, and these are the most widely attended and popular of the religion's events.

During religious festivals, Chinese people visit temples to take part in rituals, chanting, food, celebrations, parades, and to make offerings of prayers, incense, fruits, flowers, and monetary donations. On such days, they may observe the moral precepts very strictly, as well as partake of a full day's vegetarian diet. Some of the most important holidays celebrated by Chinese Buddhists include Buddha's Birthday (on the eighth day of the fourth lunar month), Chinese New Year and the Lantern Festival (on the first and fifteenth days of the first lunar month), and the Ghost Festival (fifteenth day of the seventh lunar month).

=== List of holidays ===
The following holiday dates given are based on the Chinese calendar. For example, 8.4 refers to the eighth day of the fourth month of the Chinese calendar.

- 8.12 – Enlightenment Day of Śākyamuni Buddha
- 1.1 – Birthday of Maitreya Buddha
- 9.1 – Birthday of Śakra, Lord of the Devas
- 8.2 – Renunciation Day of Śākyamuni Buddha
- 15.2 – Mahāparinirvāṇa Day of Śākyamuni Buddha
- 19.2 – Birthday of Bodhisattva Avalokiteśvara (Guan Yin)
- 21.2 – Birthday of Bodhisattva Samantabhadra
- 4.4 – Birthday of Bodhisattva Manjusri
- 8.4 – Buddha's Birthday
- 15.4 – Vesak
- 13.5 – Birthday of Bodhisattva Sangharama (Qie Lan)
- 3.6 – Birthday of Skanda (Wei Tuo)
- 19.6 – Enlightenment Day of Bodhisattva Avalokiteśvara
- 13.7 – Birthday of Bodhisattva Mahāsthāmaprāpta
- 15.7 – Ullambana Ghost Festival
- 24.7 – Birthday of Bodhisattva Nagarjuna
- 30.7 – Birthday of Bodhisattva Kṣitigarbha
- 22.8 – Birthday of Dīpaṃkara Buddha
- 19.9 – Renunciation Day of Bodhisattva Avalokiteśvara
- 30.9 – Birthday of Bhaiṣajyaguru Buddha (Medicine Buddha)
- 5.10 – Anniversary of the death of Bodhidharma
- 17.11 – Birthday of Amitabha Buddha

== See also ==
- Budai
- Buddhism in Southeast Asia
- Buddhism in China
- Buddhism in Hong Kong
- Buddhism in Taiwan
- Buddhism and Eastern religions
- Chinese Buddhist cuisine
- Dharma Drum Mountain
- East Asian Buddhism
- Fo Guang Shan
- Four Buddhist Persecutions in China
- List of Buddhist architecture in China
- List of converts to Buddhism
- Manjusri (Wen Shu)
- Samantabhadra (Pu Xian)
- Silk Road transmission of Buddhism
- Persecution of Buddhists in China
- Timeline of Buddhism
- Shuilu ritual paintings
- Zhiyuan fabao kantong zong lu, a translation catalog
