= Zhiyuan fabao kantong zong lu =

The Zhìyuán fǎbǎo kāntòng lù (Chinese: 至元法寶勘同) is a Yuan dynasty catalog of over 1,400 of Chinese Buddhist translations from Sanskrit which indicates the corresponding Tibetan and Sanskrit titles when available. The catalog was first published in 1289.
