= Huayan Temple (Datong) =

Buddhist temple in Shanxi, China

- 华严寺
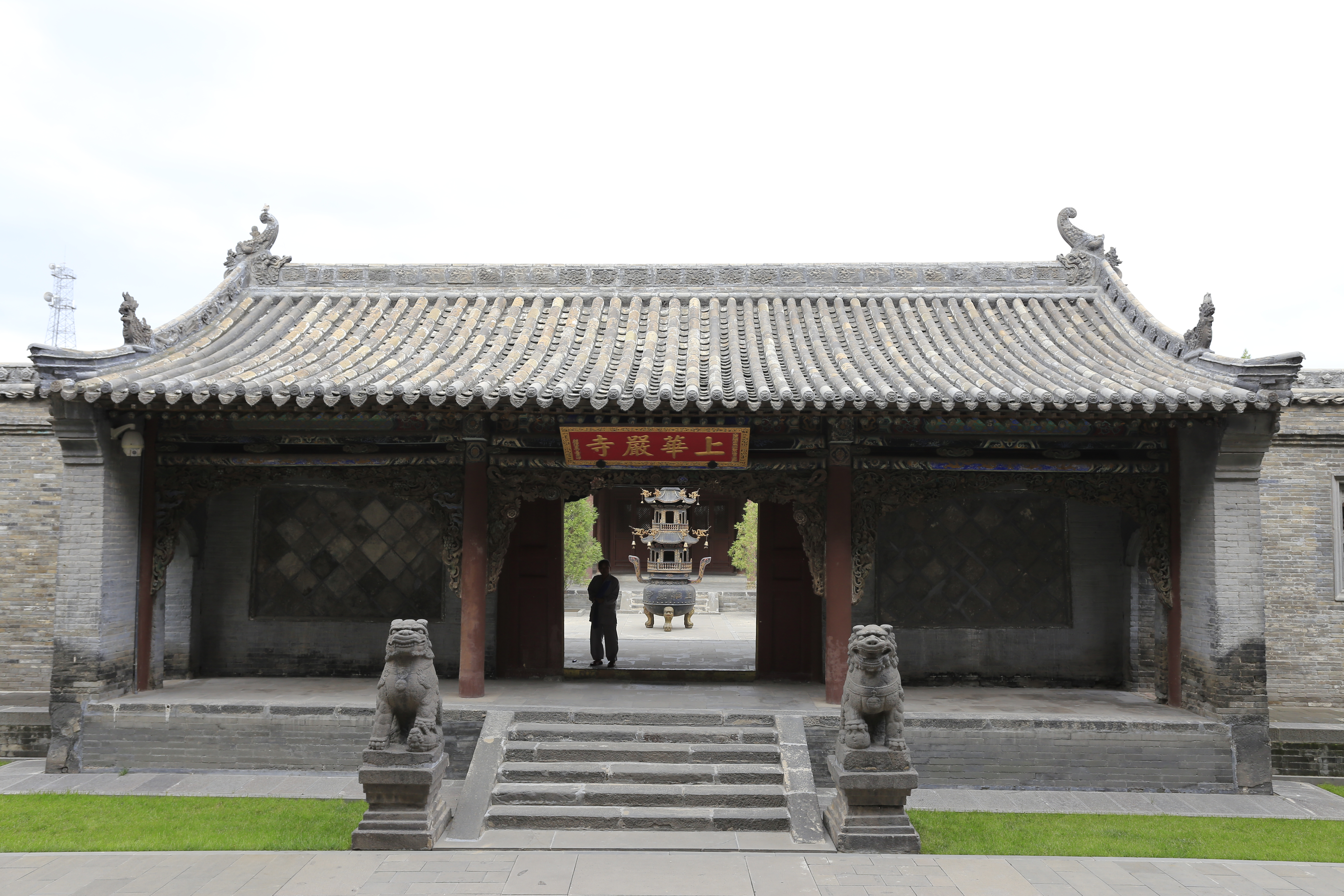
- The Shanmen at Huayan Temple.

- Location within Shanxi

Religion
- Affiliation: Buddhism

Location
- Location: Pingcheng District, Datong, Shanxi
- Country: China
- Coordinates: 40°05′56″N 113°18′05″E

Architecture
- Style: Chinese architecture
- Established: 1038
- Completed: 1140 (reconstruction)

Website
- www.sxdthys.com

Huayan Temple or Huayan Monastery (simplified Chinese: 华严寺; traditional Chinese: 華嚴寺; pinyin: Huáyán Sì) is a Buddhist temple located in Datong, Shanxi, China.

Huayan Temple has been burned down and rebuilt several times. The Daxiongbao Hall and Cangjing Ge still preserve the architectural style of the Liao and Jin dynasties (907–1234). It is an artistic complex of ancient Chinese architecture, sculpture, frescoes and inscriptions, as well as a cultural synthesis of religion and politics.

== History ==
=== Liao dynasty ===
The temple was first established in 1038, in the 7th year of Chongxi period (1032–1055) in the Liao dynasty (907–1125). The name of "Huayan" derives from Avatamsaka Sutra, which more commonly known as "Huayan Sutra" (华严经) in China. Part of the temple was devastated in 1122, during the war between Liao and Jin dynasties.

=== Jin dynasty ===
Huayan Temple was restored and redecorated in 1140, in the 3rd year of Tianjuan period (1138–1140) in the Jin dynasty (1115–1234). Abbot Tongwu (通悟) rebuilt the Daxiongbao Hall, Guanyin Hall, Shanmen, and Drum tower. In 1166, Emperor Shizong visited the temple.

=== Yuan dynasty ===
During the reign of Emperor Wuzong (1308–1311) in the Yuan dynasty (1271–1368), abbot Huiming (慧明) supervised the reconstruction of Huayan Temple. Daxiongbao Hall, abbot's room, and dining room were gradually renovated. In the heyday of the temple, it had hundreds of halls and rooms. After the fall of the Yuan dynasty, most of the temple buildings were destroyed in the battle between the Hongjin and Mongolian armies.

=== Ming dynasty ===
In the early Ming dynasty (1368–1644), the temple was confiscated. It reactivated its religious activities in the mid-15th century, during the Xuande (1426–1435) and Jingtai periods (1450–1456).

=== Qing dynasty ===
At the dawn of the Qing dynasty (1644–1911), in 1648, Huayan Temple was reduced to ashes by a devastating fire, with only the Daxiongbao Hall and Buddhist Texts Library remaining. The temple declined and incredibly disappeared during the middle and later Qing dynasty.

=== People's Republic of China ===
After the founding of the Communist State, the government provided great protection for the temple.

Huayan Temple as inscribed among the first group of "Major National Historical and Cultural Sites in Shanxi" by the State Council of China in 1961.

It has been designated as a National Key Buddhist Temple in Han Chinese Area by the State Council of China in 1983.

== Architecture ==
The complex includes the following halls: Shanmen, Daxiongbao Hall, Bojia Jiaozang Hall, Mi Le Hall, Guanyin Hall, Yaoshi Hall, Wenshu Pavilion, Puxian Pavilion, Bell tower, Drum tower, Zushi Hall, Dharma Hall, Wood Pagoda, etc.

=== Daxiongbao Hall ===
The current structure of the Daxiongbao Hall dates back to 1140 during the Jin dynasty (1115–1234). While the hall was originally built in 1062 under the Liao dynasty, it was destroyed by fire in 1122 during a rebellion and was rebuilt in 1140 during the succeeding Jin dynasty. The hall was built to face the east, being nine rooms wide, five rooms deep and covering an area of 1,559 square metres (16,780 sq ft). Standing on a platform more than 4 meters high, it is one of the largest extant Buddhist halls from the Liao and Jin dynasties, and one of the two largest existing historical temples in China (the other being the Daxiongbao Hall of Fengguo Temple in Liaoning). The eaves are 9.5 meters high, with a hip roof. The glazed tile roof ornaments on the ridge are very large, reaching a height of 4.5 meters, with each tile being 76 centimeters long and weighing 27 kilograms. On each end of the main ridge is giant Chiwen, a legendary animal with a dragon head and fish tail with colorful glaze and vivid style. They are relics of the Jin (1115–1234) and Ming dynasties (1368–1644).

The hall employs a column-reduction technique, reducing the number of inner columns by twelve, thus expanding the front space to facilitate the arrangement of Buddha statues and performance of rituals. The center of the hall enshrines the statues of the Five Tathagathas, which were carved in the Xuande period (1426–1435) of the Ming dynasty (1368–1644). The three Buddhas in the center: Piluzhena Fo (Mahāvairocana), Amituofo (Amitābha) and Achu Fo (Akshobhya), were carved from wood, while the other two Buddhas: Baosheng Fo (Ratnasambhava) and Bukong Chengjiu Fo (Amoghasiddhi), along with the attendant bodhisattvas, were sculpted from clay. Ming dynasty statues of the Twenty-Four Protective Deities are also placed on both sides of the hall flanking the central altar.

Three walls of the hall are covered with murals, the paintings reaching a height of 64 meters and covering an area of 887.25 square meters in total. The murals depict various events from Buddhist scriptures and Buddhist figures, such as Sudhana's pilgrimage to find fifty-three spiritual teachers from the Avatamsaka Sutra, children worshipping the Bodhisattva Guanyin, the thousand-armed and thousand-eyed manifestation of Guanyin known as Qianyan Qianshou Guanyin, Arhats and others. The murals were painted during the Guangxu period (1875-1908) of the Qing dynasty by a group of craftsmen. The ceiling also features 73 painted panels, also mostly made during the Qing dynasty, depicting a variety of patterns including circles, loong, and fenghuang, flowers and Sanskrit.

On the north wall outside the hall entrance are four steles inscribed with the Yijing by Zhu Xi, a famous Neo-Confucian scholar of the Song dynasty. Beneath the south building's corridor, a stone tablet inscribed with a poem titled "Taihu Lake" written by the renowned Ming Dynasty writer Wen Zhengming. In summer, canna lilies, passionflowers, oleanders, and red hydrangeas bloom in the courtyard, their vibrant colors and fragrant aromas filling the air.

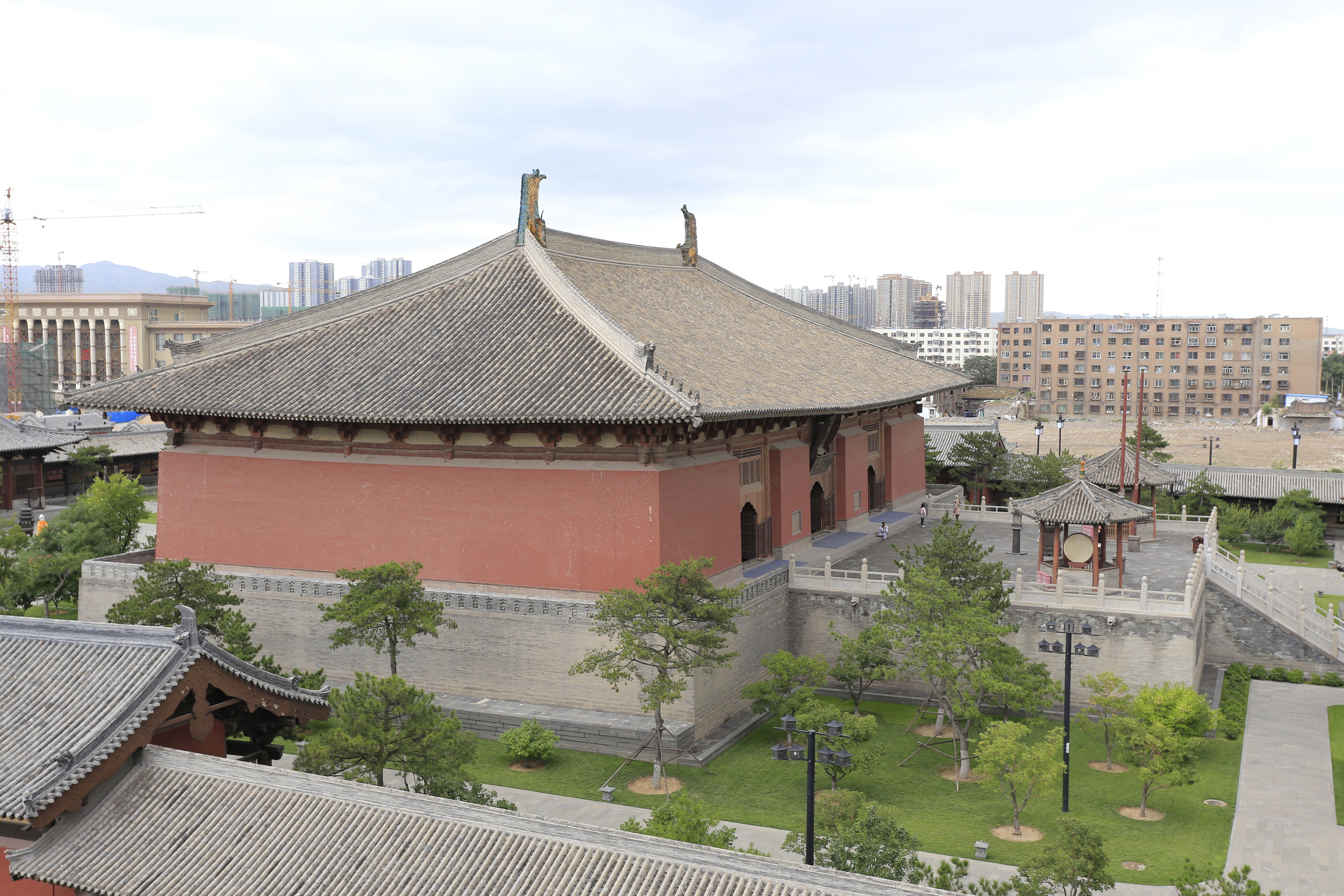
The Daxiongbao Hall, built in 1140 during the Jin dynasty. The platform the hall is on was built during the earlier Liao dynasty.

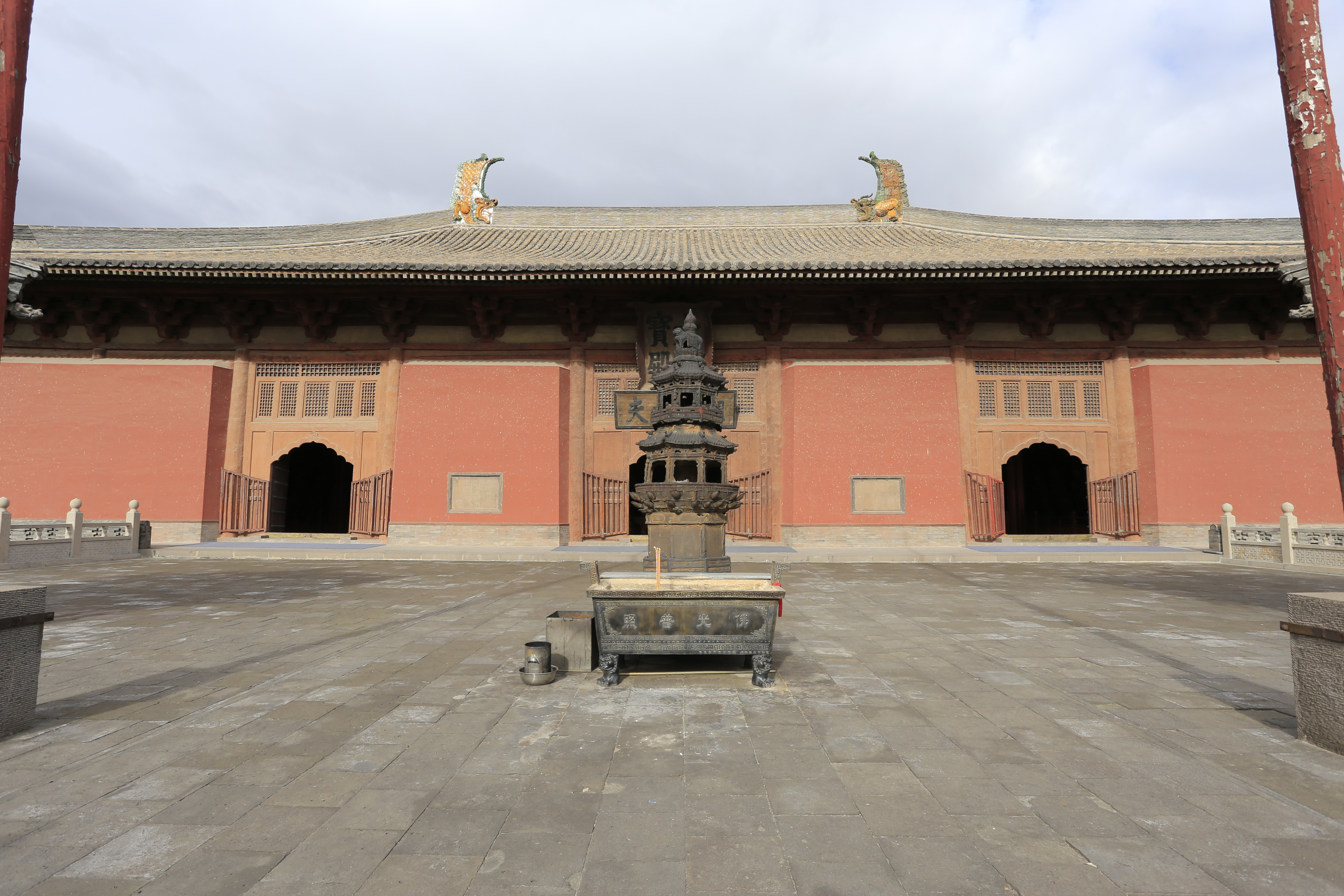
Front view of the Daxiongbao Hall

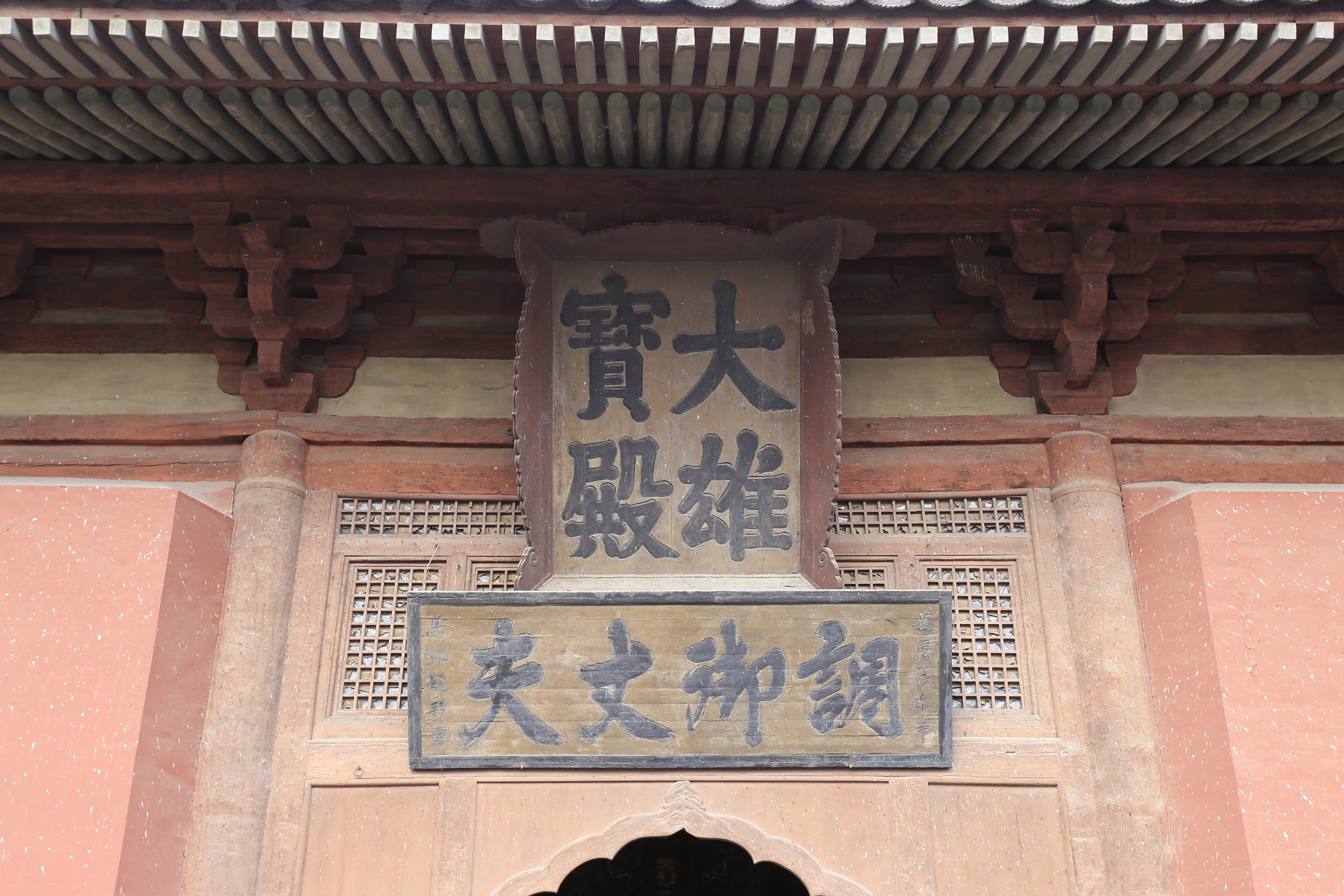
Plaque with the words "Daxiongbao Hall" written on it, inscribed during the Ming dynasty

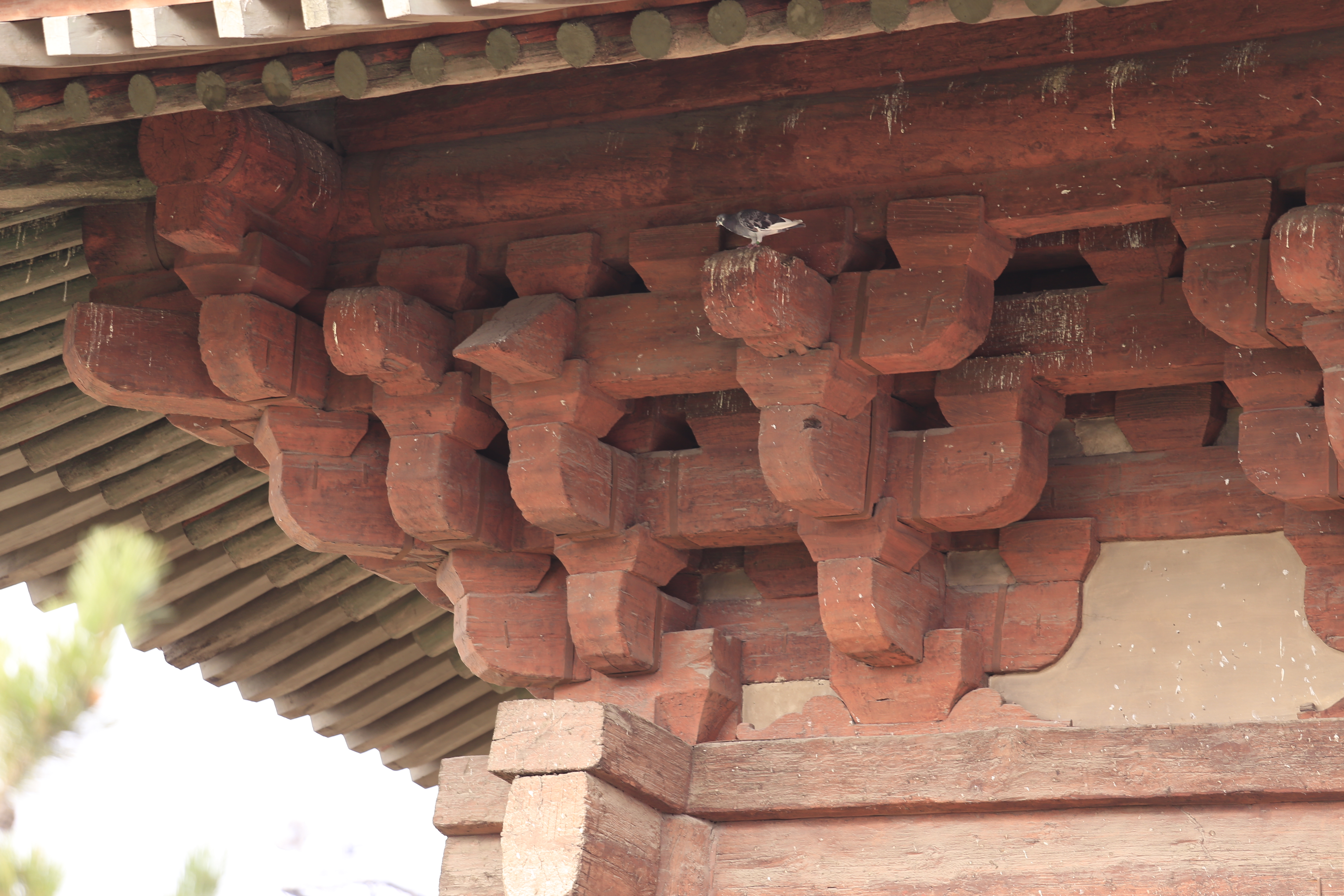
One of the Dougongs on the outer corner of the Daxiongbao Hall

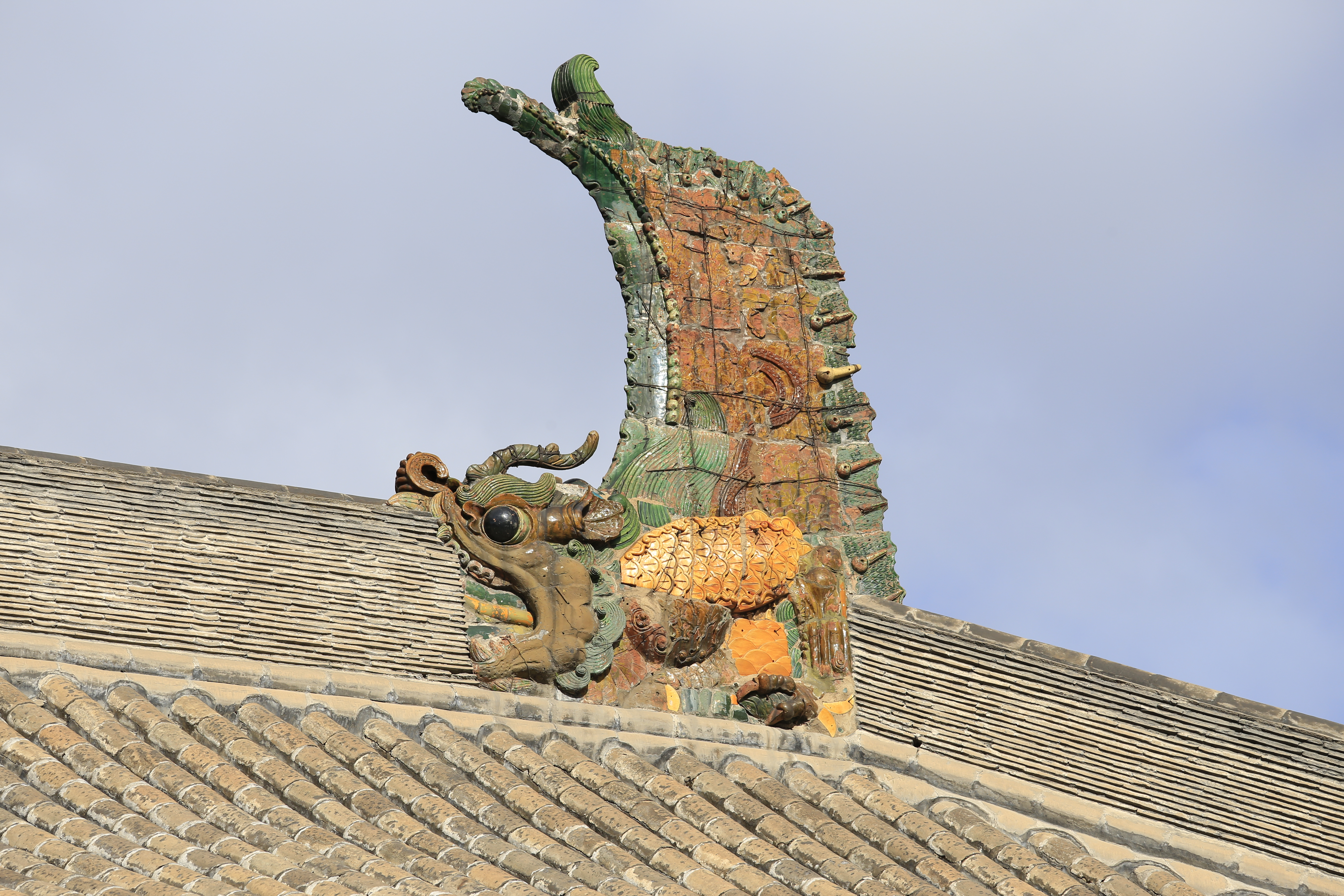
One of the Chiwen on the roof

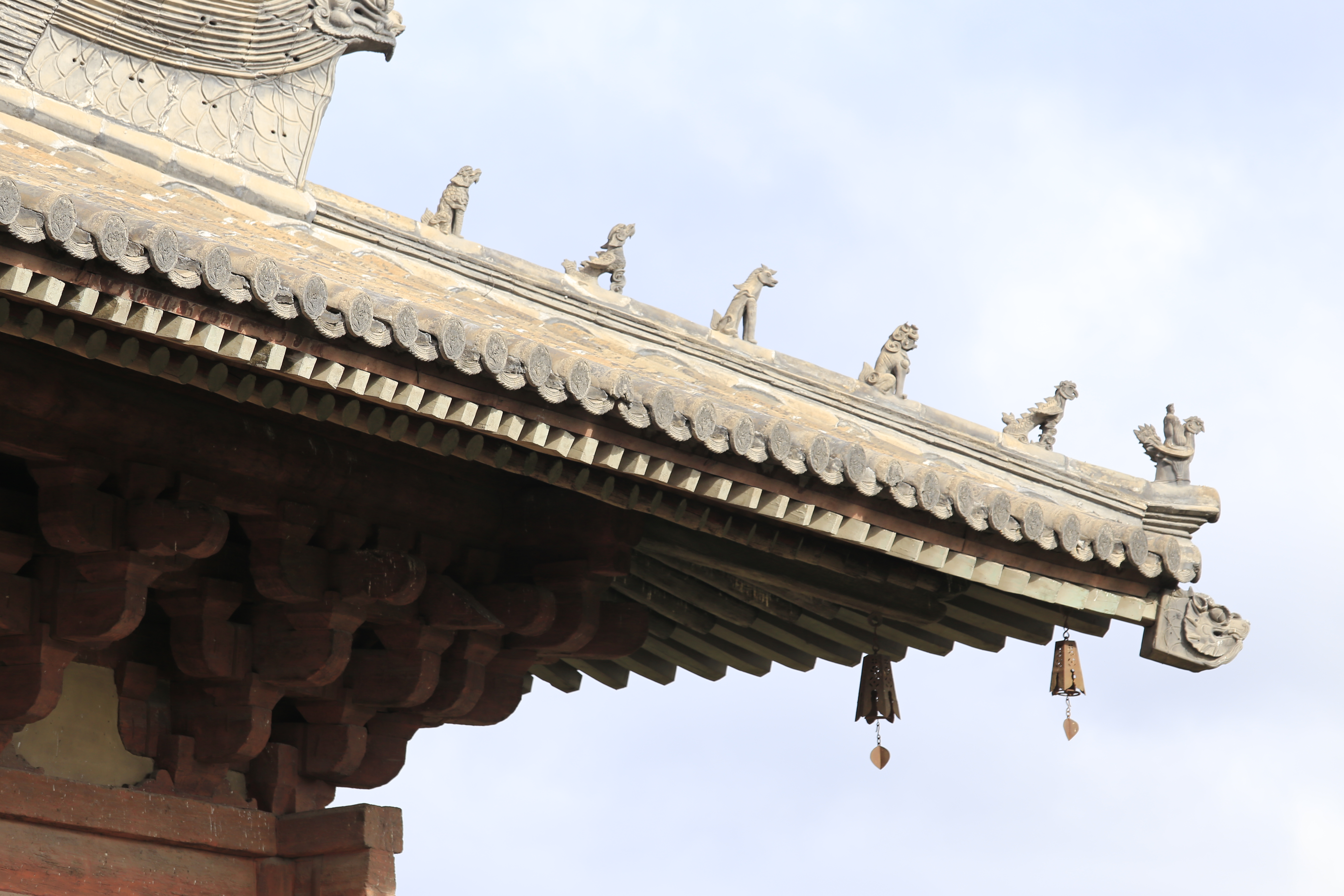
Decorations on the roof

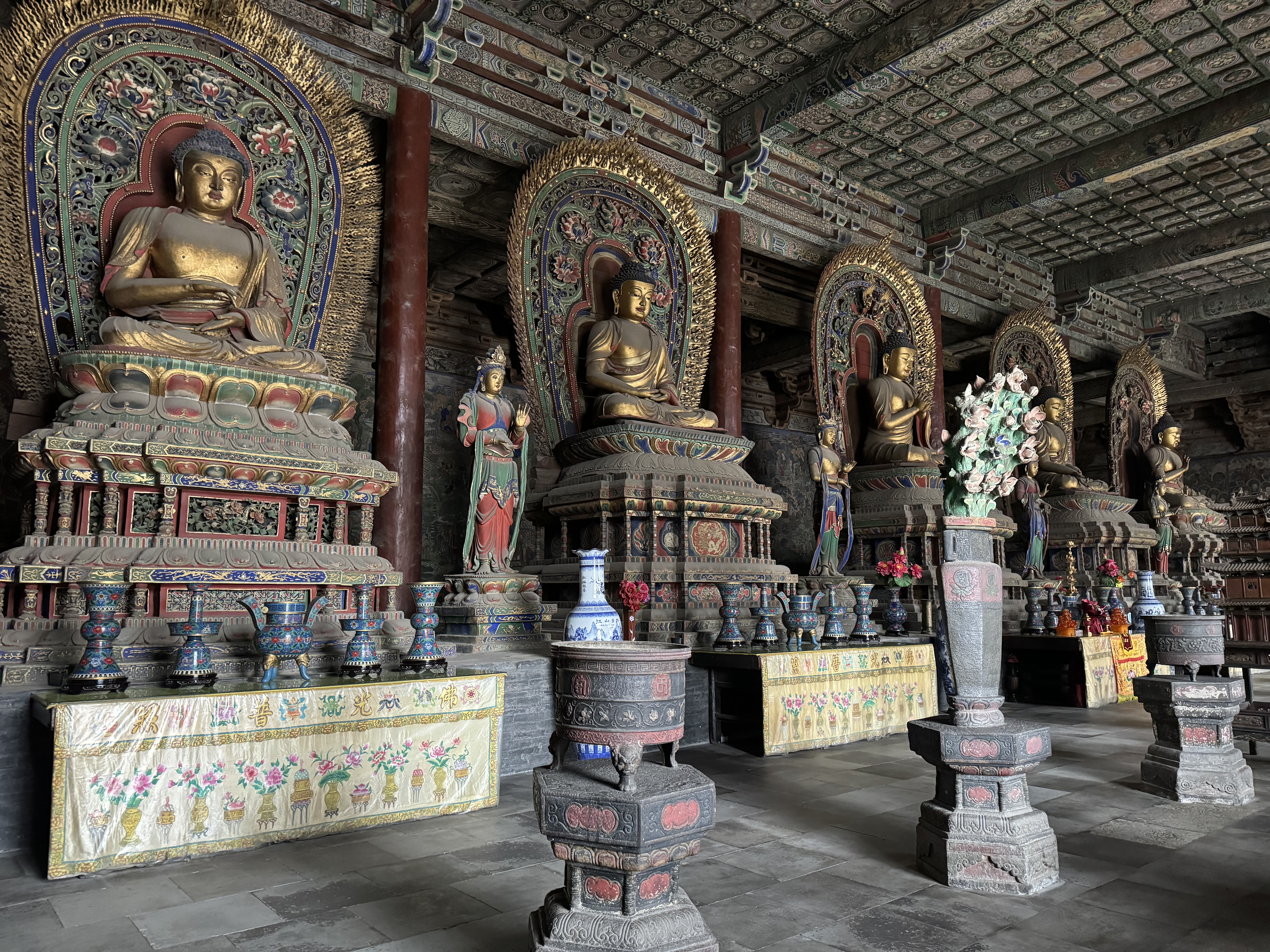
Ming dynasty statues of the Five Tathāgatas in Shanhua Temple in Datong, Shanxi, China. From left to right: Baosheng Fo, Amituofo, Piluzhena Fo, Achu Fo, Bukong Chengjiu Fo

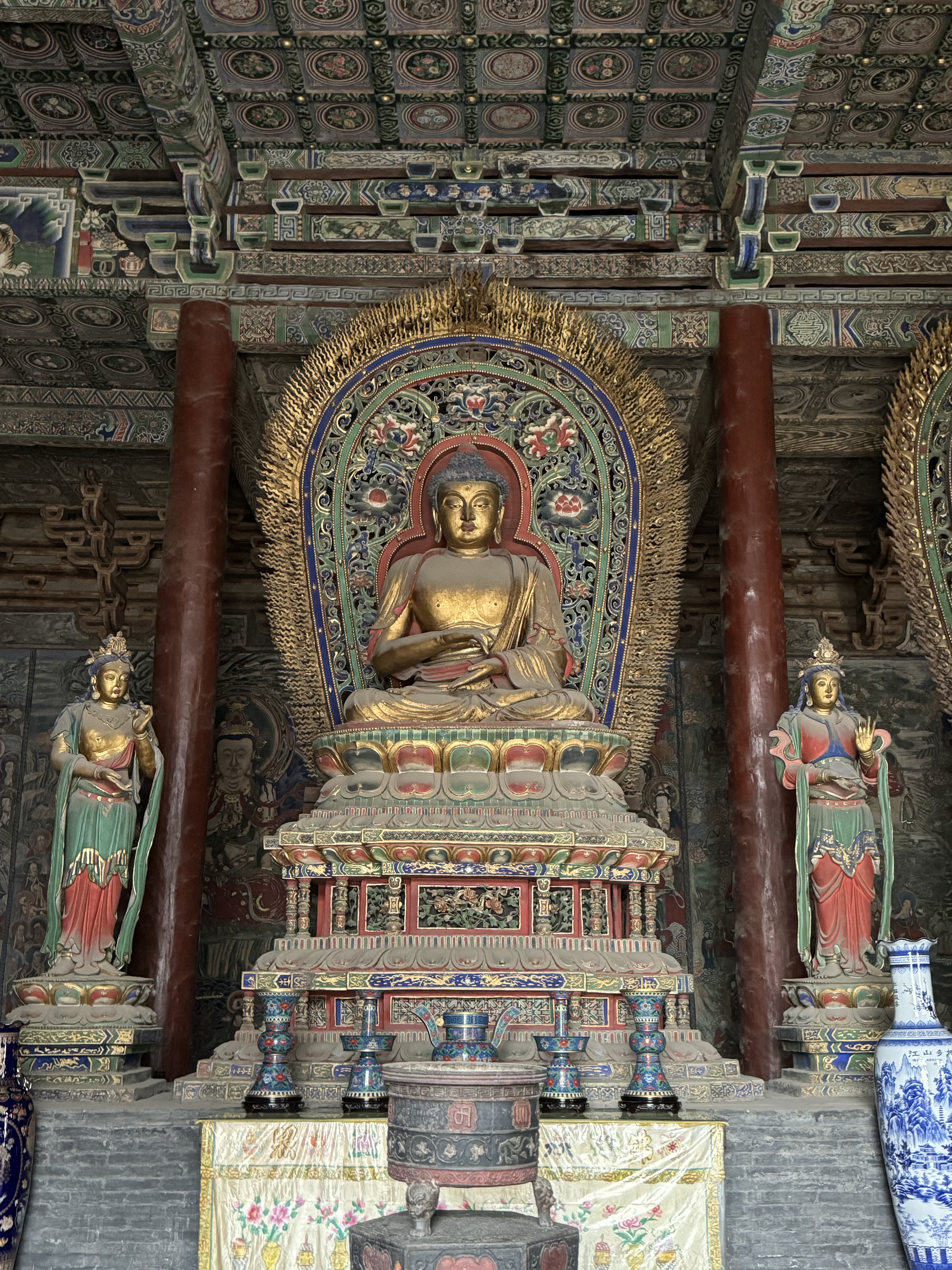
Baosheng Fo

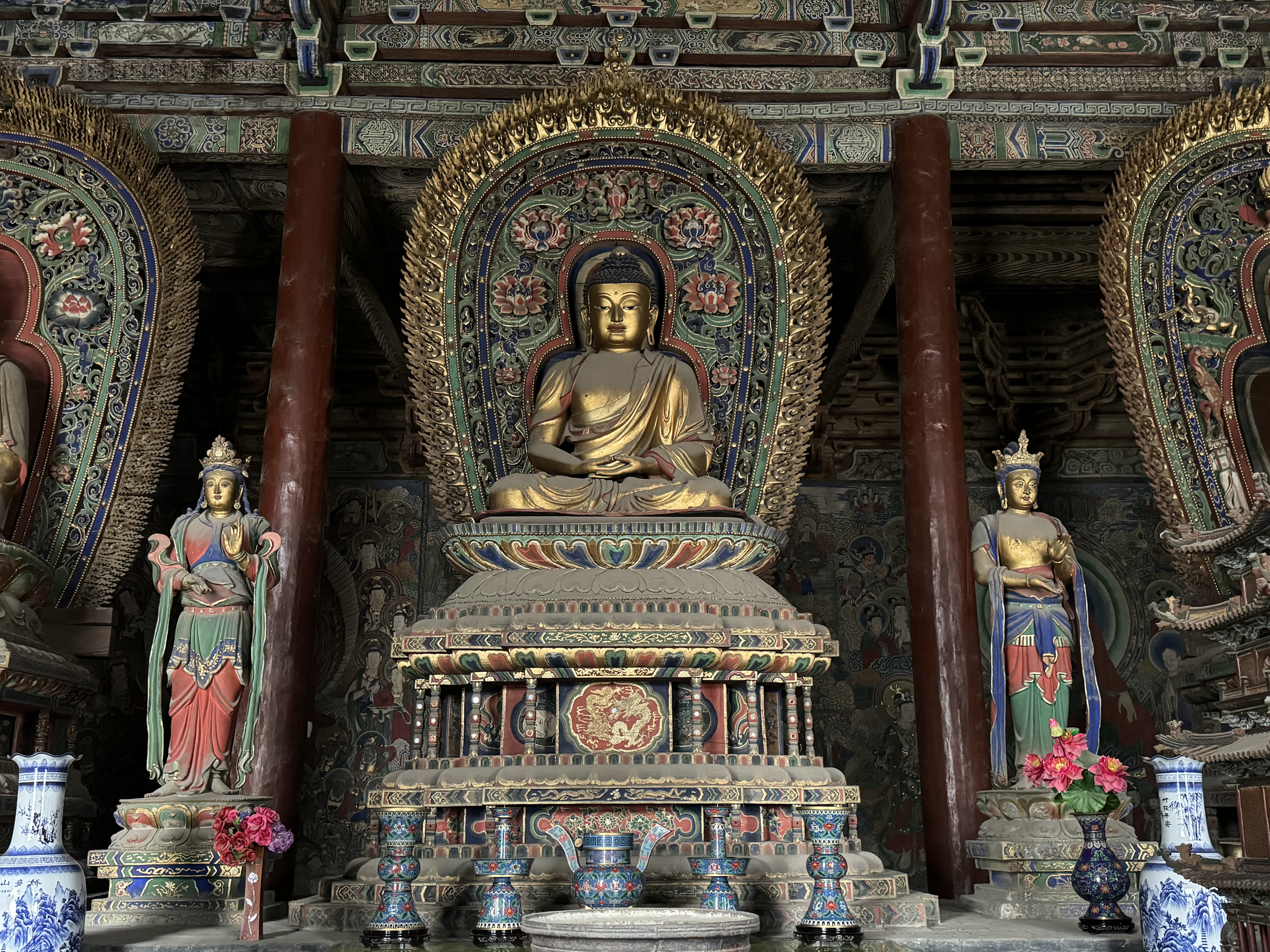
Amituofo

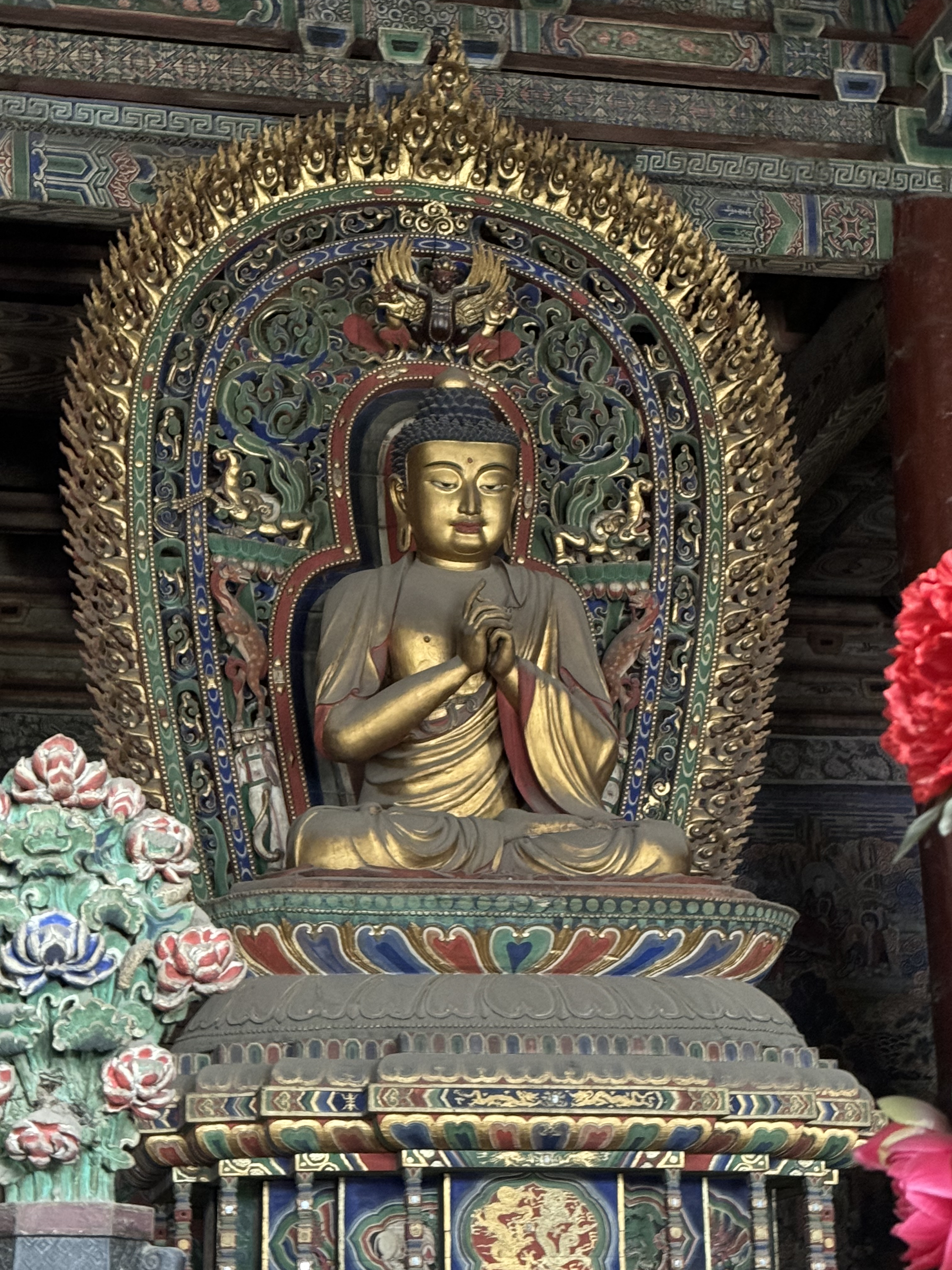
Piluzhena Fo

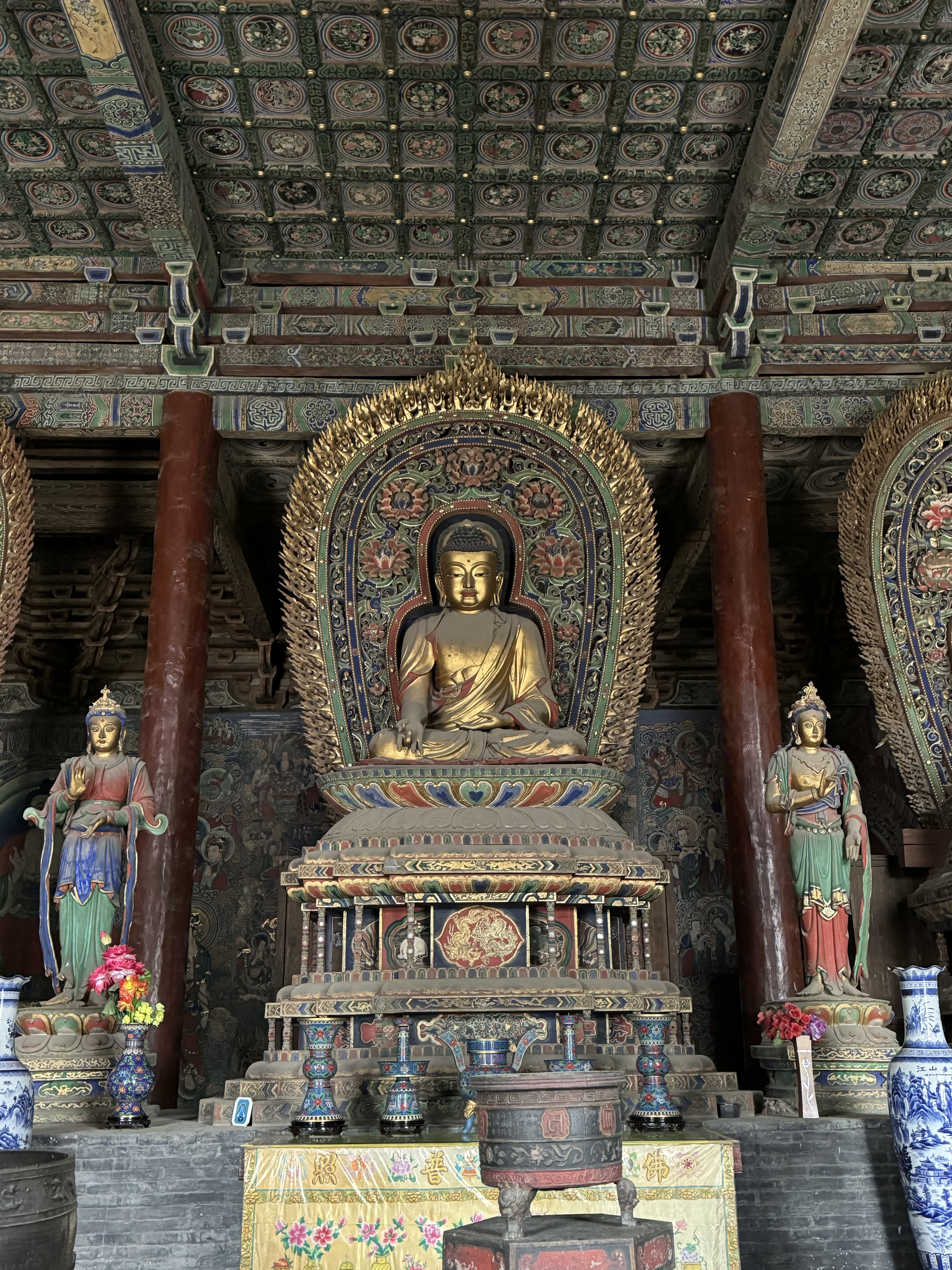
Achu Fo

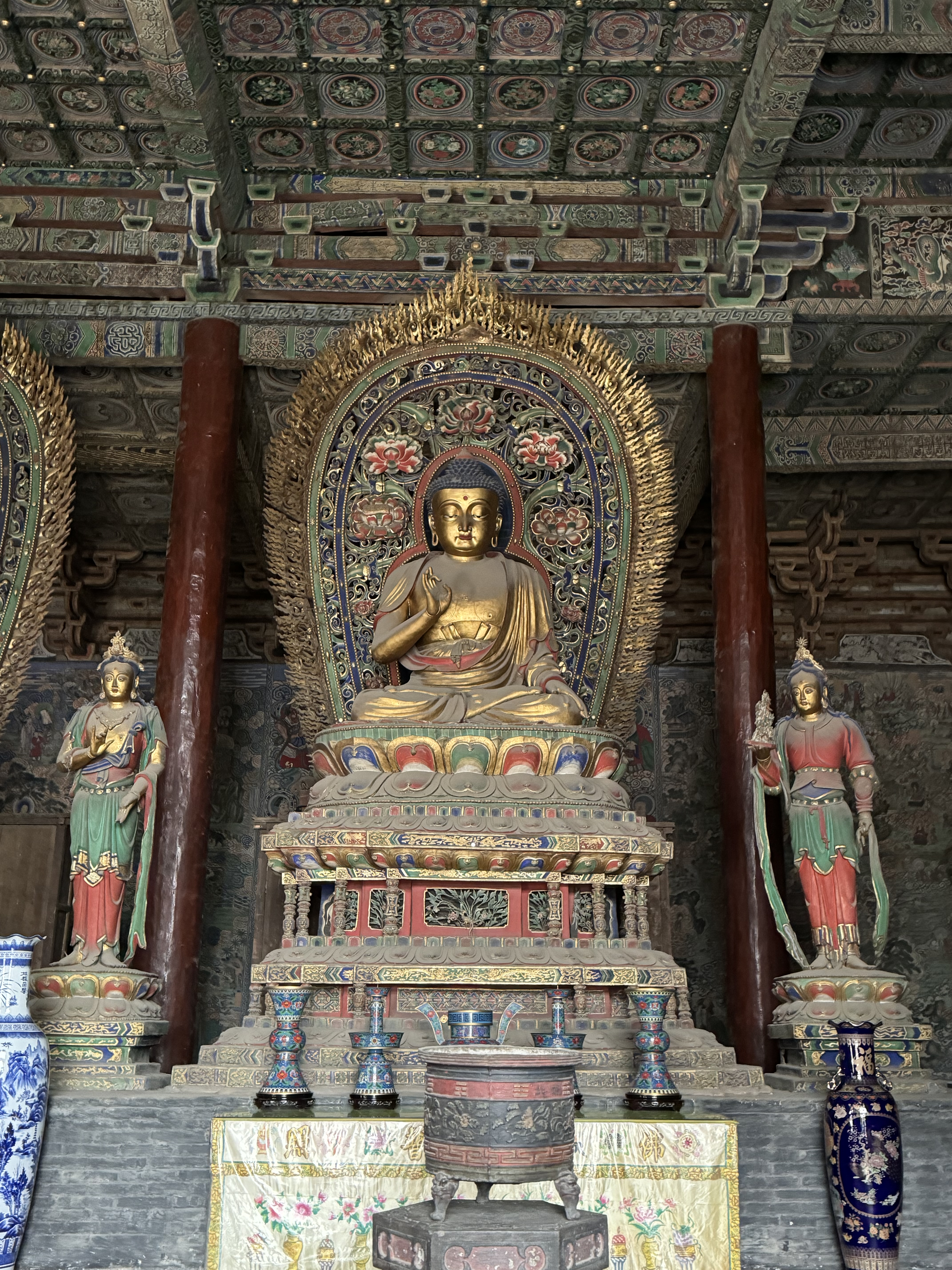
Bukong Chengjiu Fo

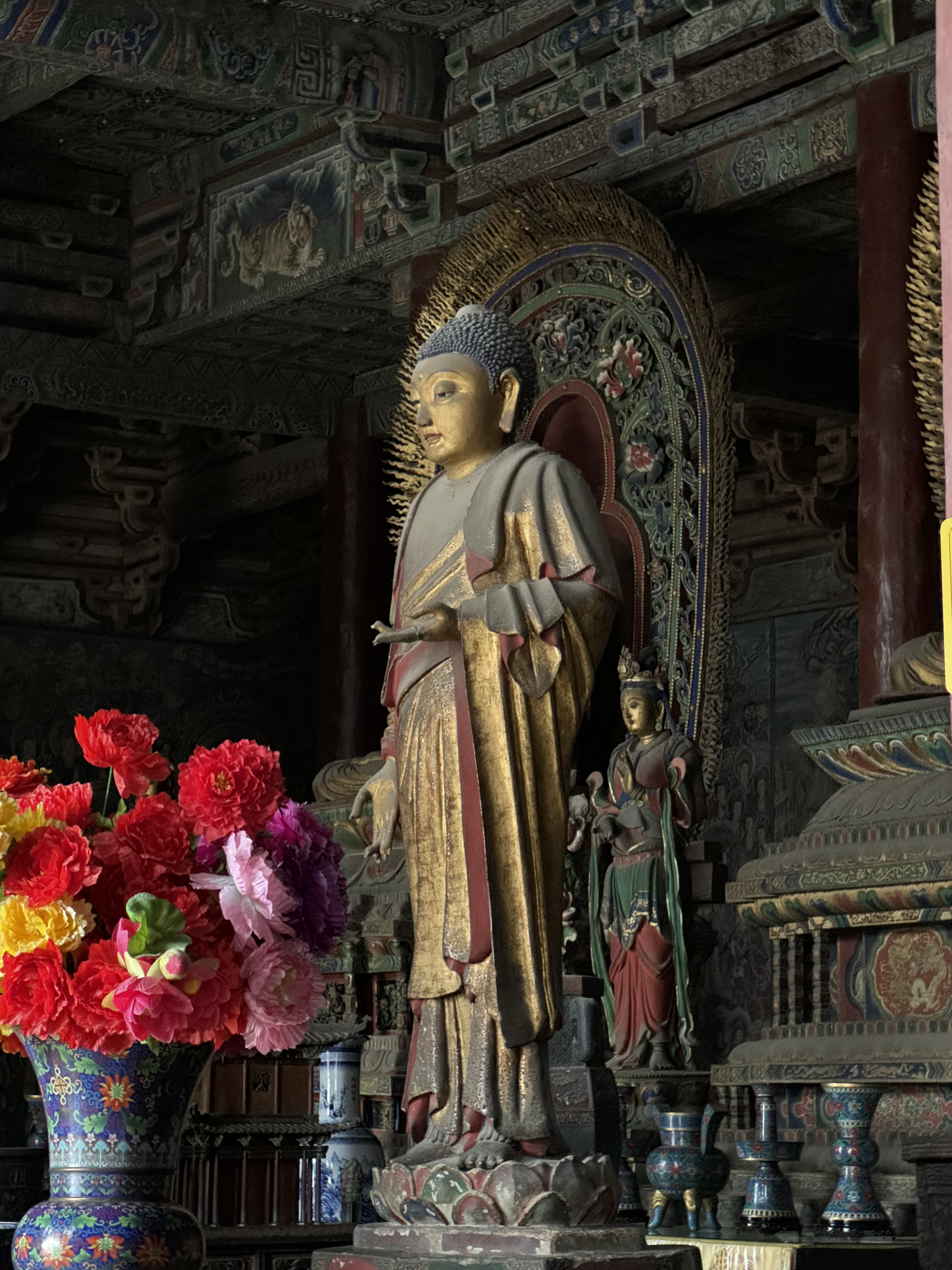
Ming dynasty standing statue of a Buddha with a welcoming stance

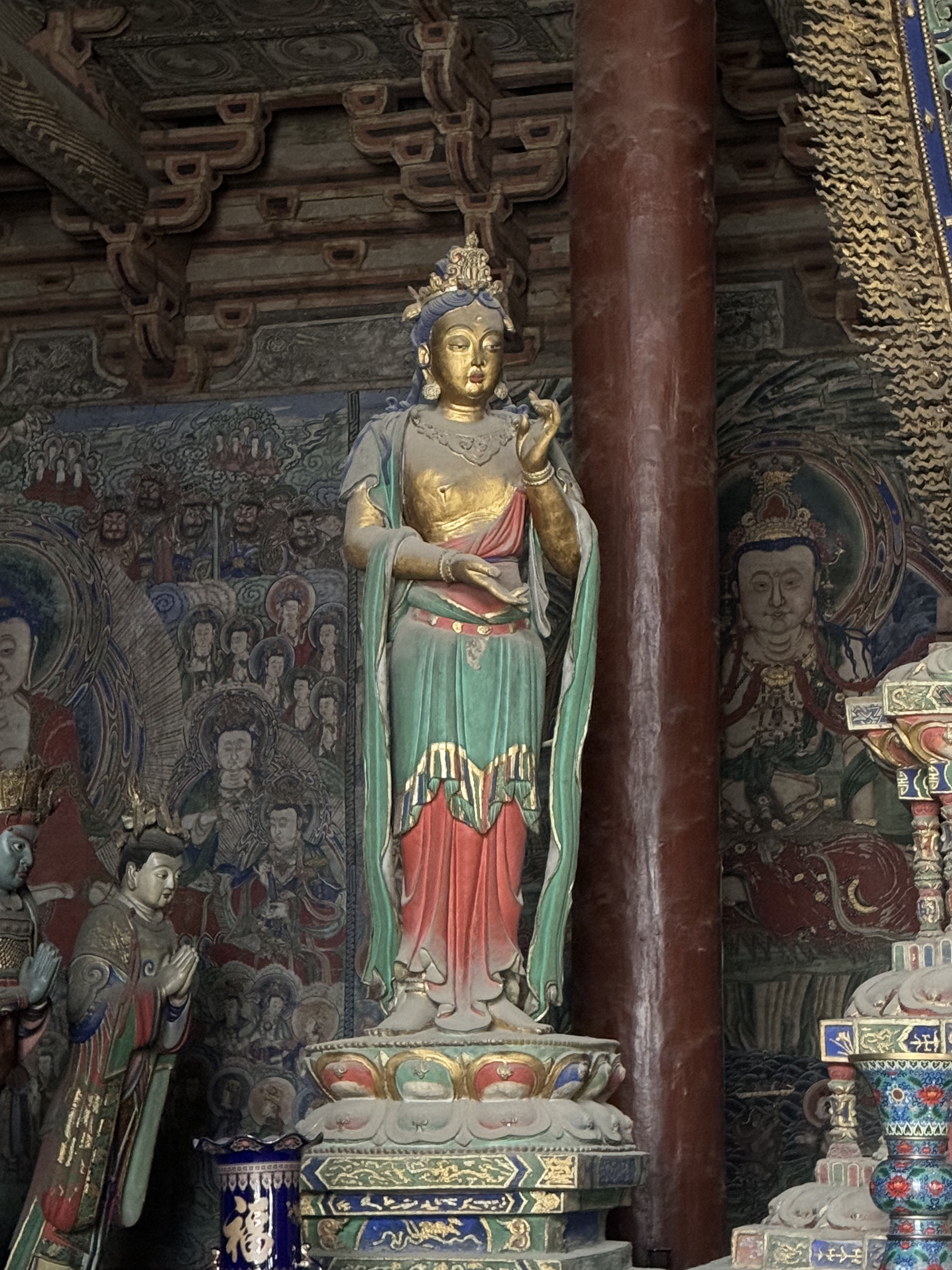
Attendant Bodhisattva beside Achu Fo

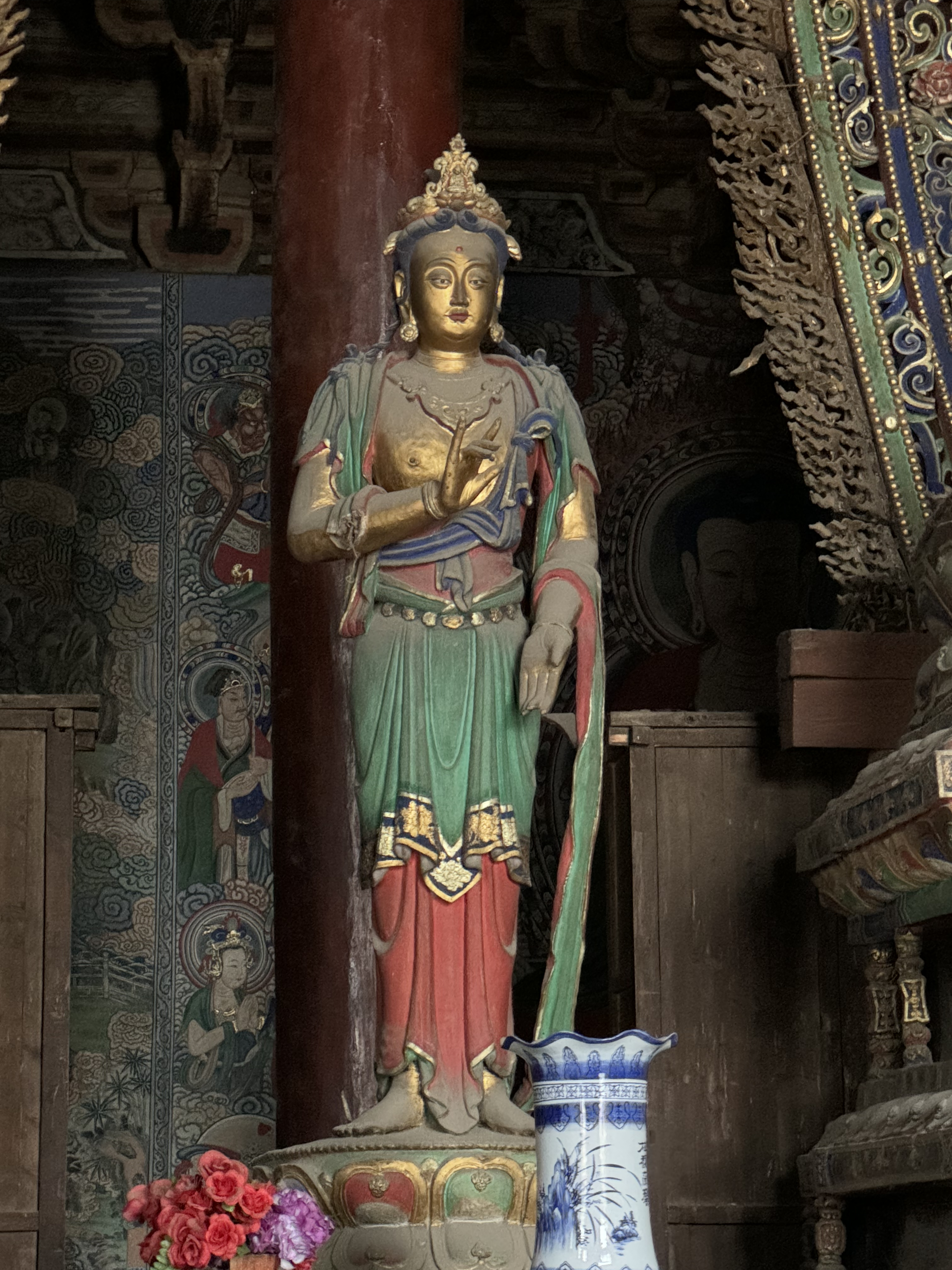
Attendant Bodhisattva beside Bukong Chengjiu Fo

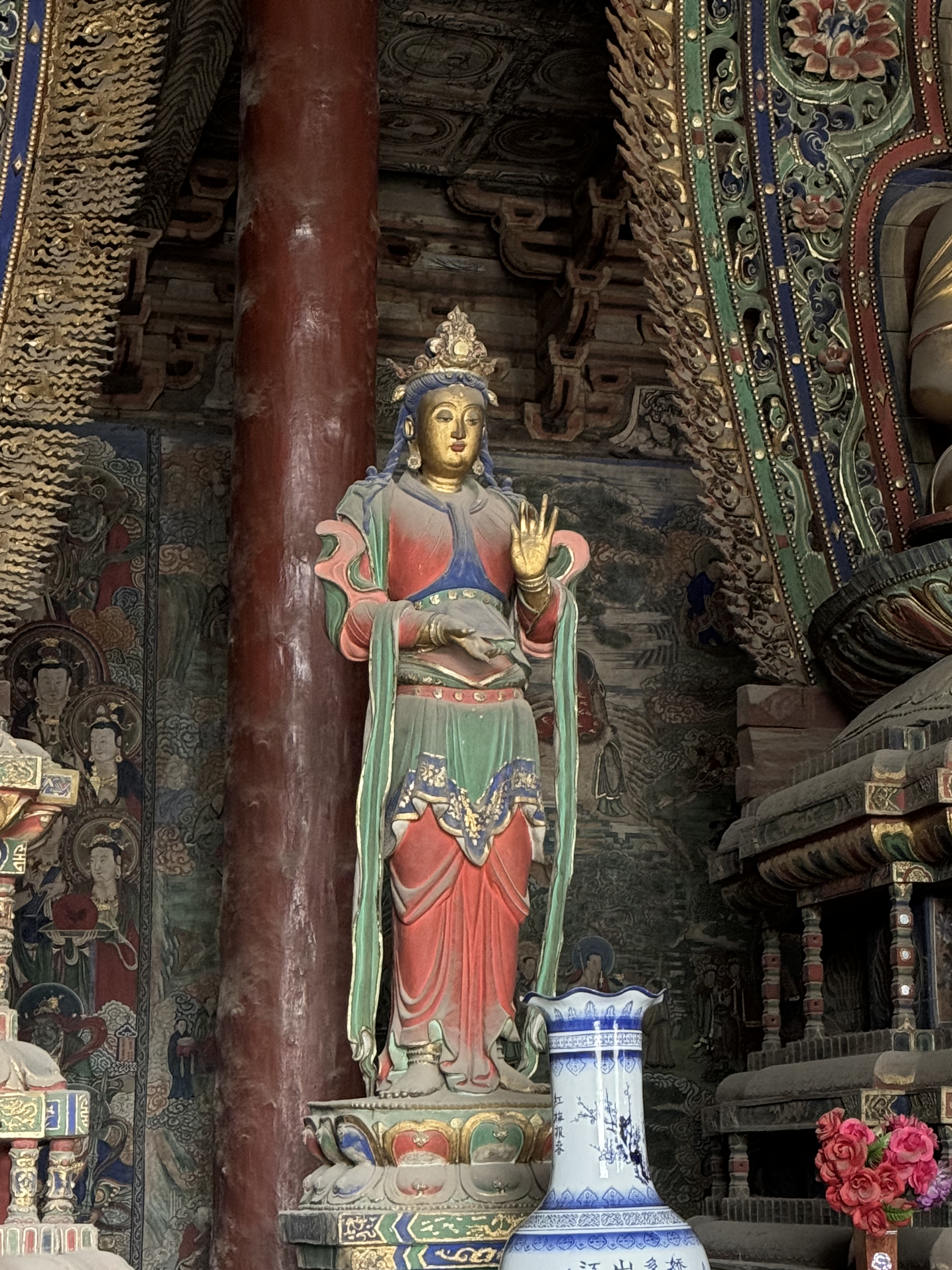
Attendant Bodhisattva beside Baosheng Fo

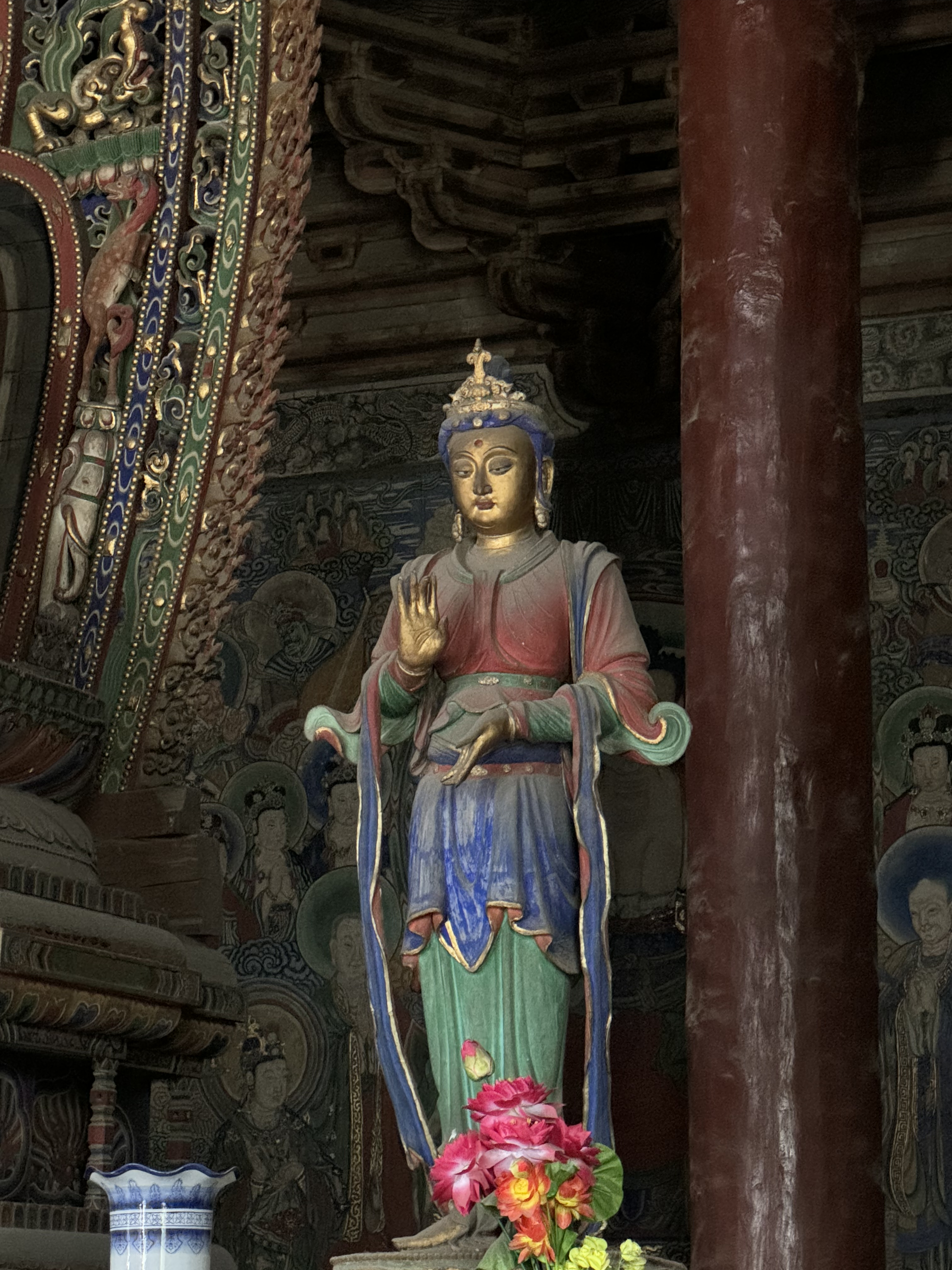
Attendant Bodhisattva beside Amituofo

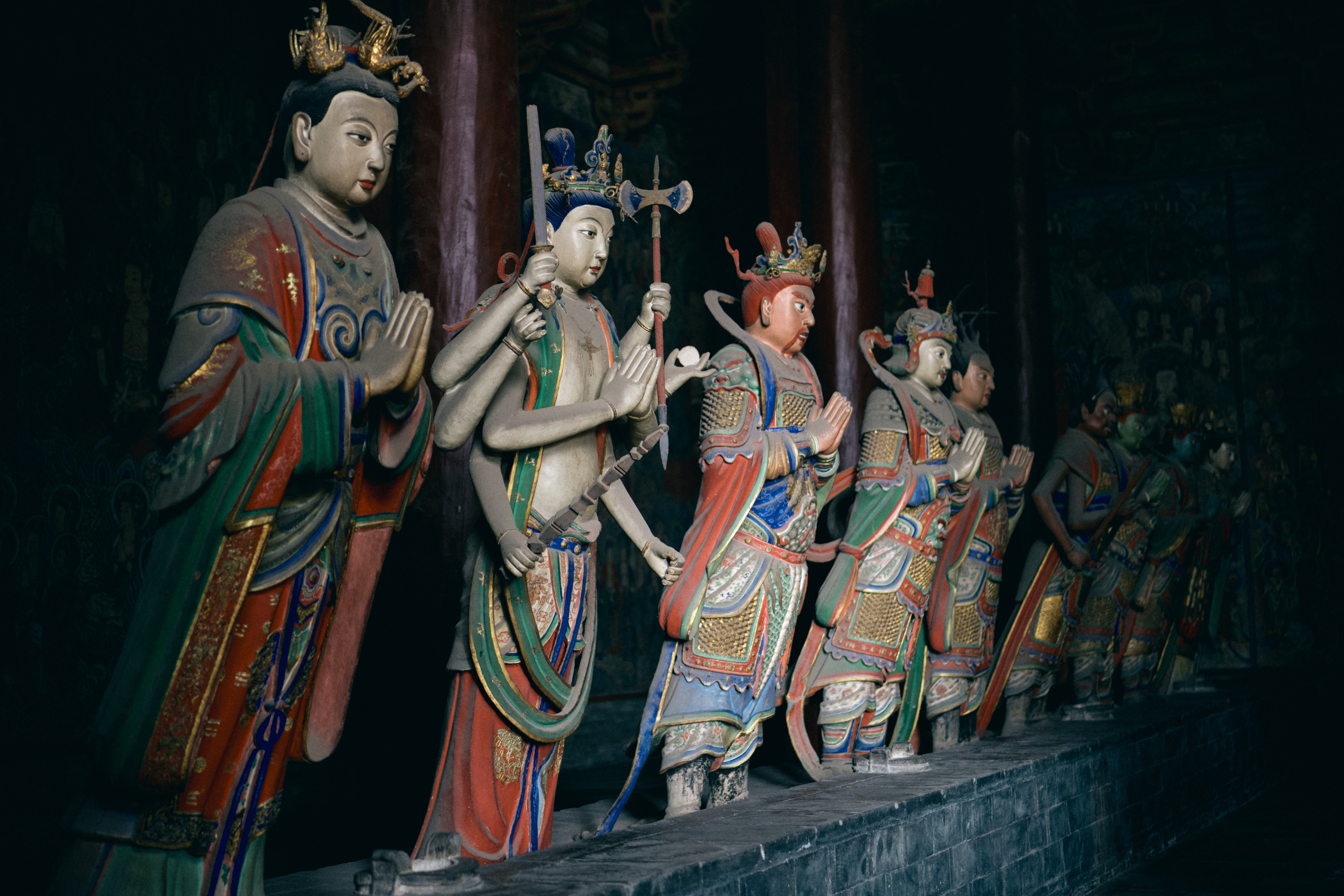
Statues of the Twenty-Four Devas on the left side of the hall

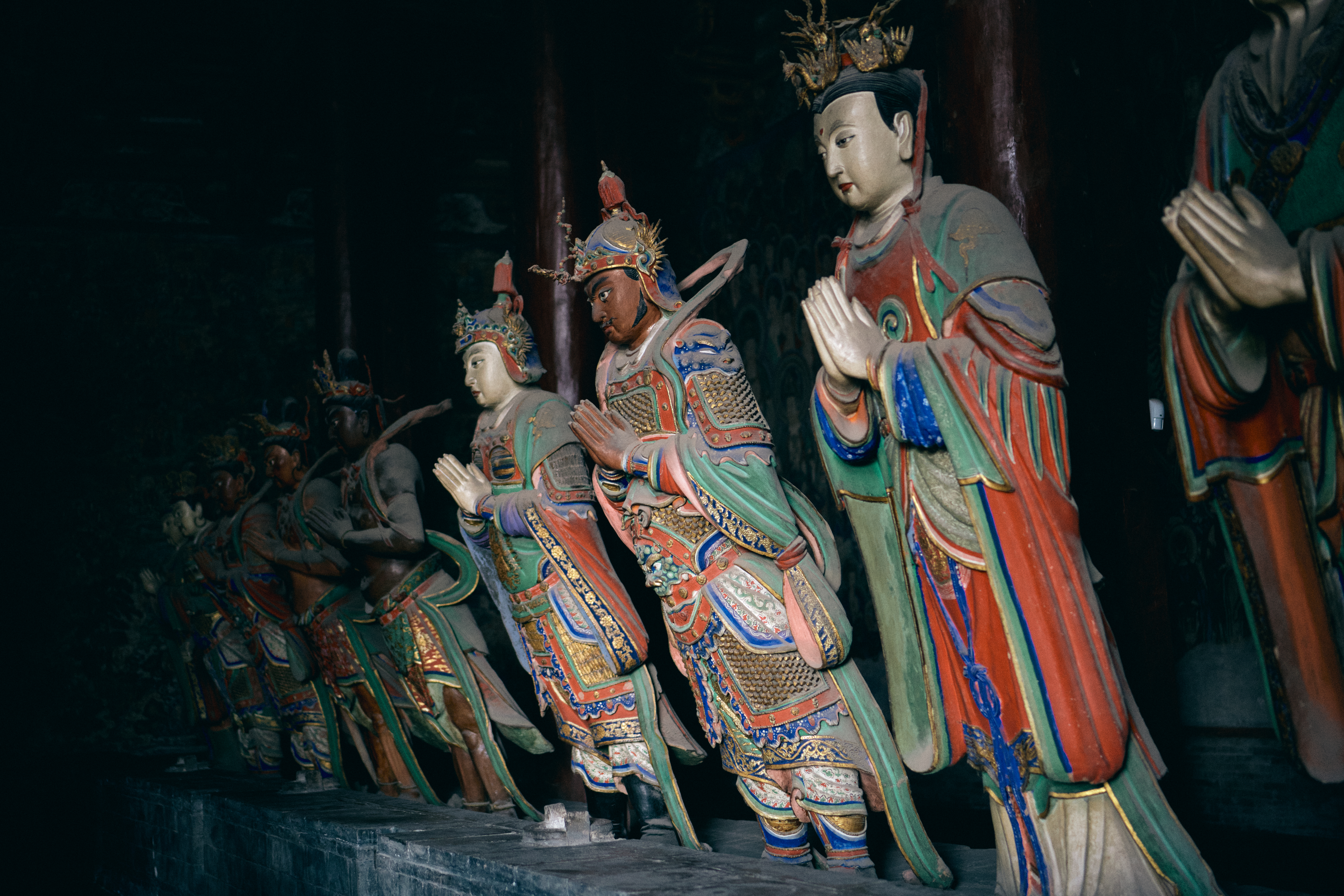
Statues of the Twenty-Four Devas on the right side of the hall

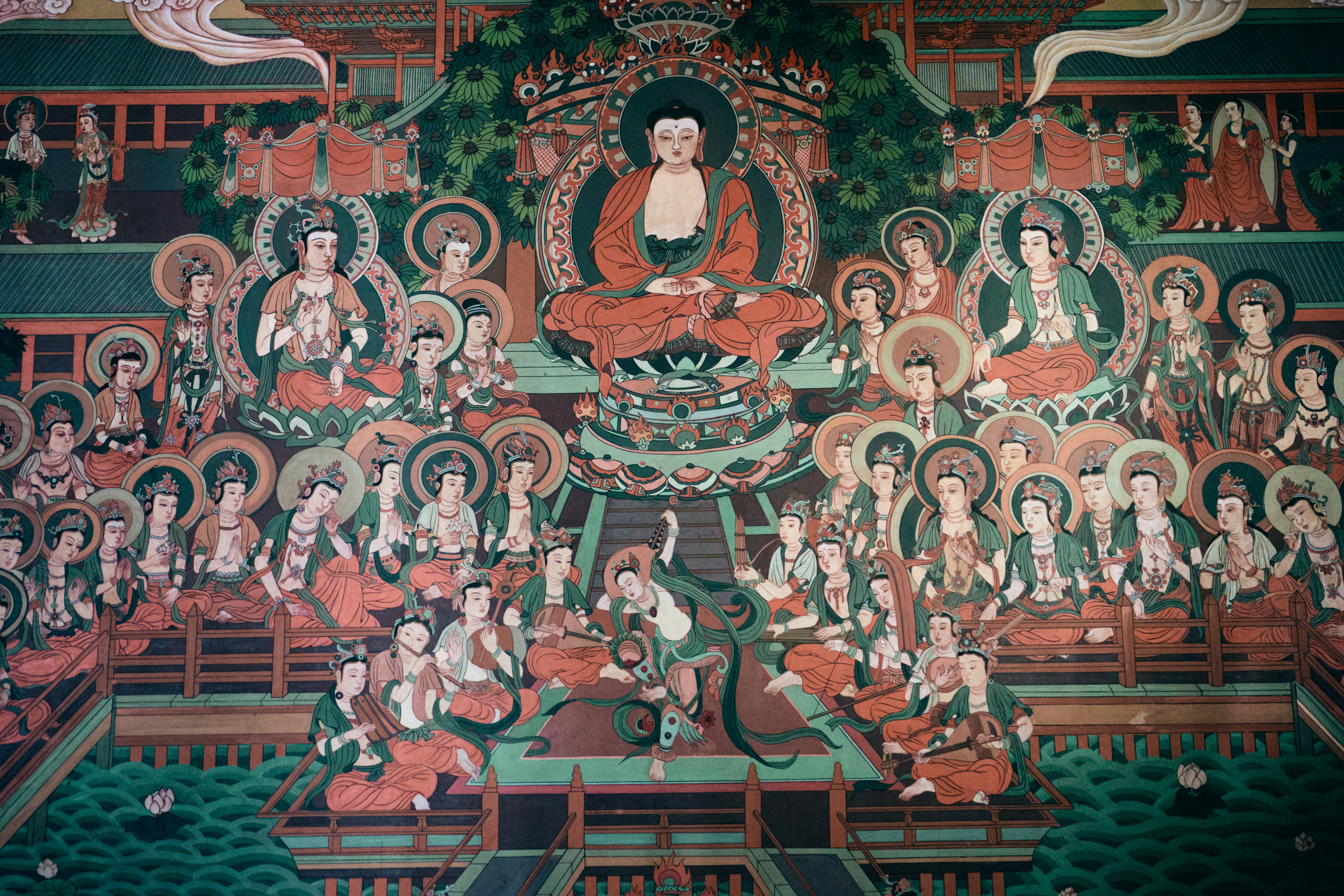
Mural depicting a Buddha and two Bodhisattvas seated on lotus thrones, with multiple other Bodhisattvas seated before them; possibly depicting the Pure Land of Amituofo

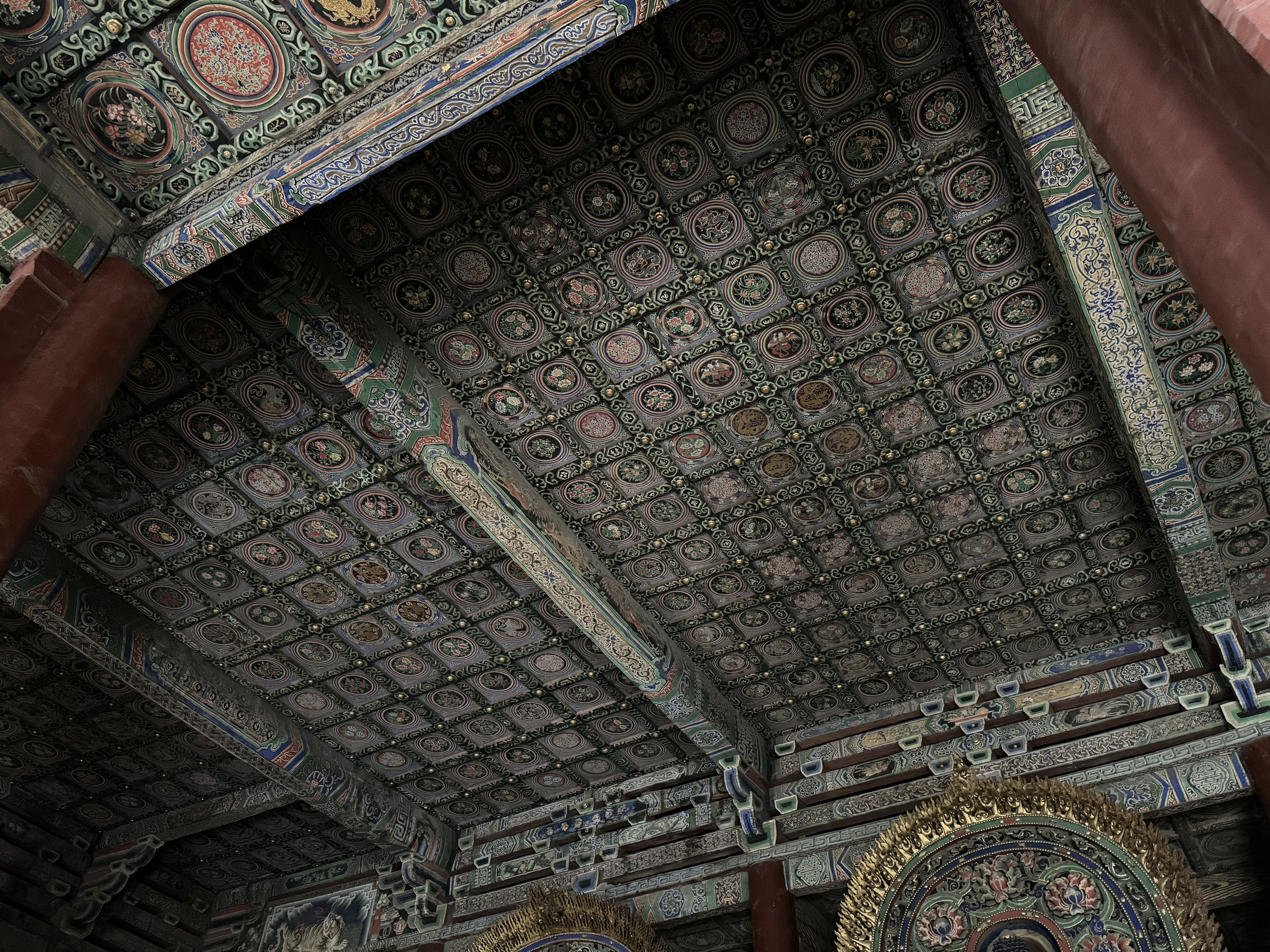
Mural painting on the ceiling

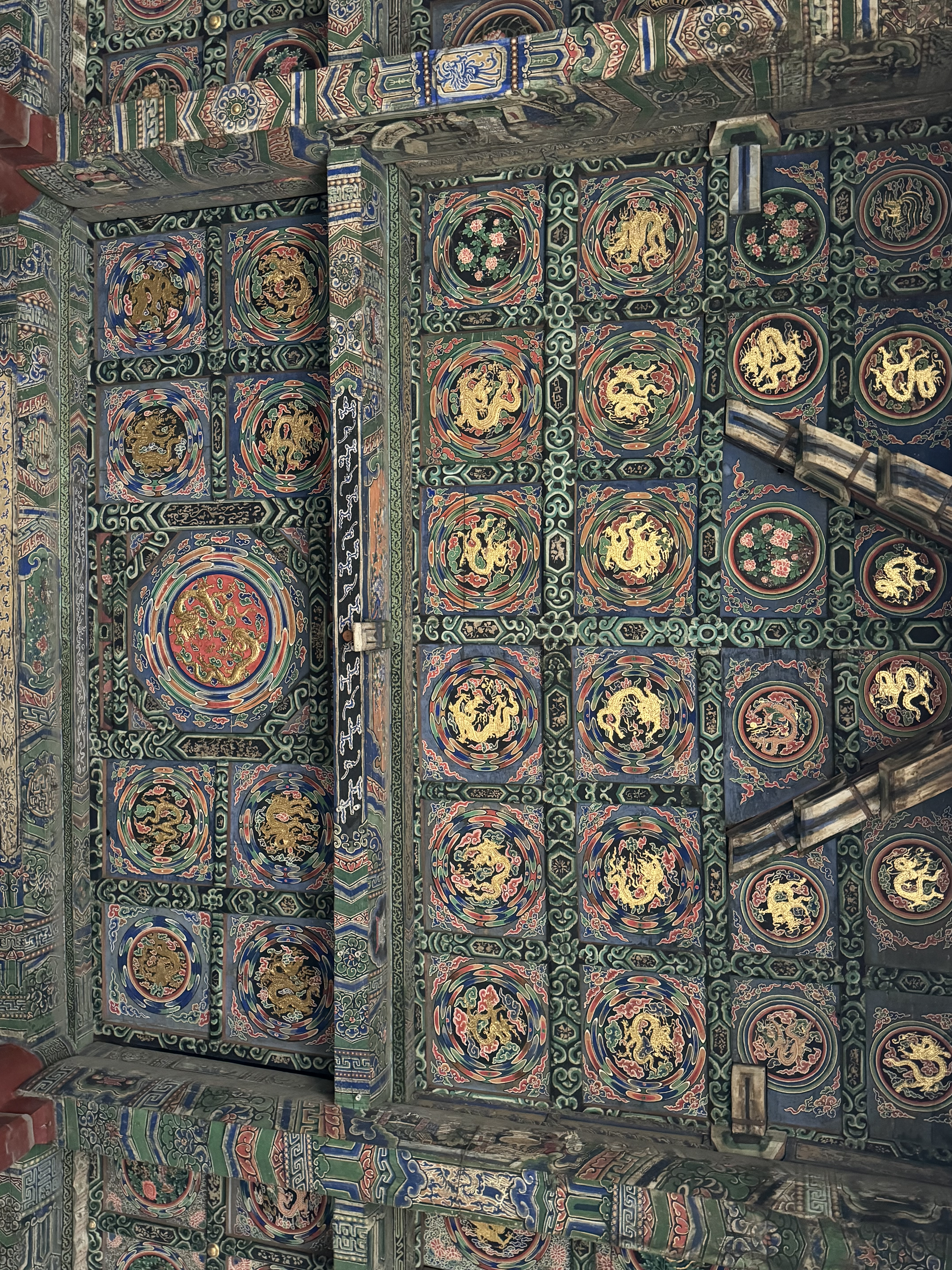
Mural painting on the ceiling depicting loongs

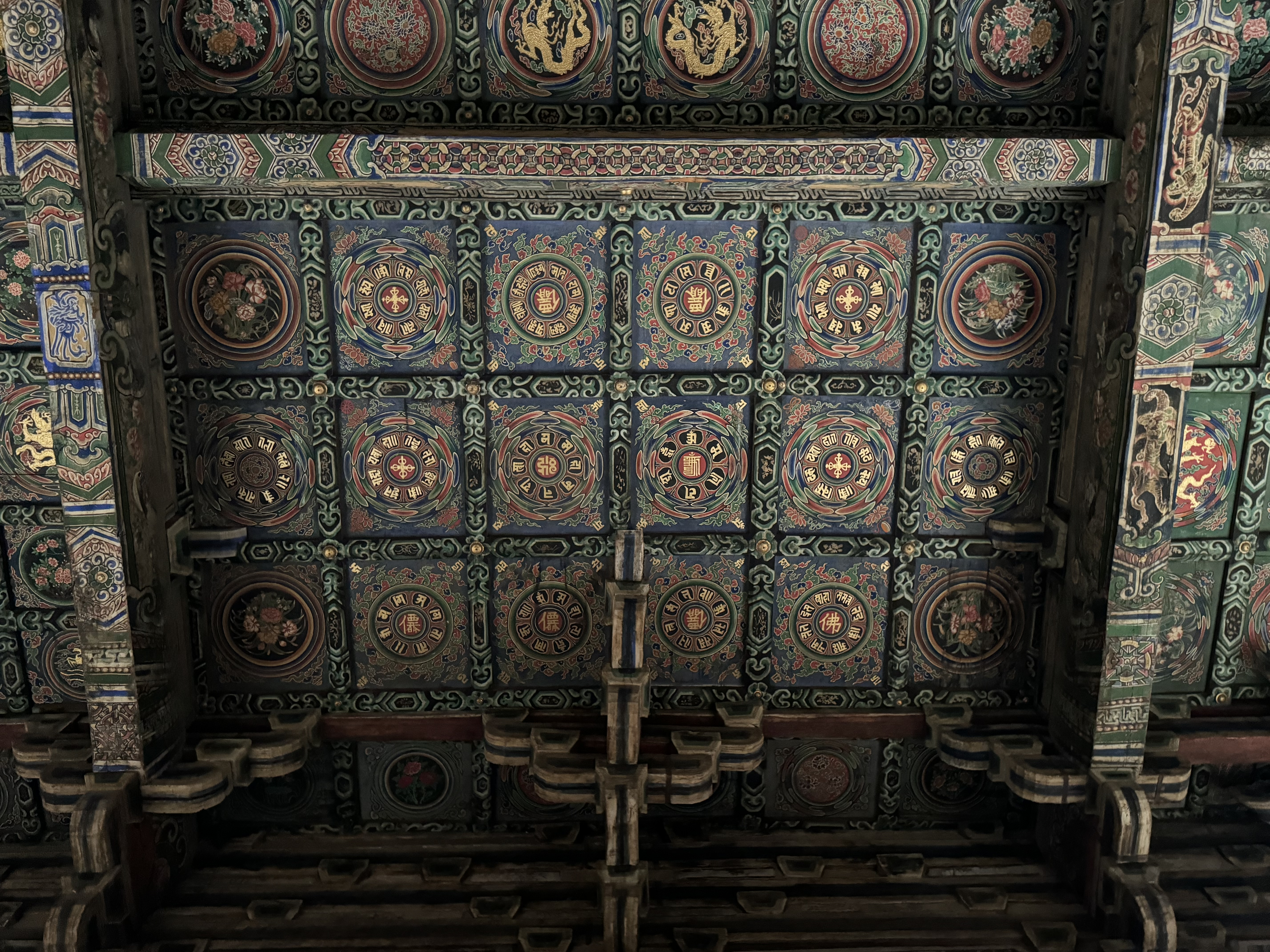
Mural painting on the ceiling depicting Sanskrit words

=== Bojia Jiaozang Hall ===
The main hall of Huayan Temple is the Bojia Jjiaozang Hall (薄伽教藏殿, lit: "Bhagavan Sutra Hall"), which serves as the Zangjing ge of the temple by storing Buddhist scriptures. Built in 1038 during the Liao dynasty, it measures five rooms in width and four rooms in depth, covering an area of 2665 square meters and retains certain Tang dynasty architectural elements. It features a single-eave hip roof. With its deep, double-tiered eaves, gently sloping beams, and prominently raised columns, the eaves extend far outwards, showcasing the traditional Chinese timber frame structure combined with bracket sets.

The hall enshrines thirty-one Liao dynasty statues in total. In the center of the main hall, three large Buddha statues sit on lotus pedestals, representing the Three Buddhas of the Three Times: Randeng Fo (Dipankara) representing the past, Shijiamounifo (Śākyamuni) representing the present, and Mi Le Fo (Maitreya) representing the future. The other statues depict disciples, offering boys, and attendant bodhisattvas listening attentively and devoutly and paying respect to the three Buddhas. The hall also contains two tiers of pavilion-style wooden wall cabinets arranged in a circular layout. These cabinets, numbering thirty-eight, are placed on a waist-high Sumeru pedestal, with scripture cabinets on top containing over 1,700 cases from the Ming and Qing dynasties, totaling more than 18,000 volumes of scriptures, including a set of Chinese Buddhist canon which was printed in the Qing dynasty.

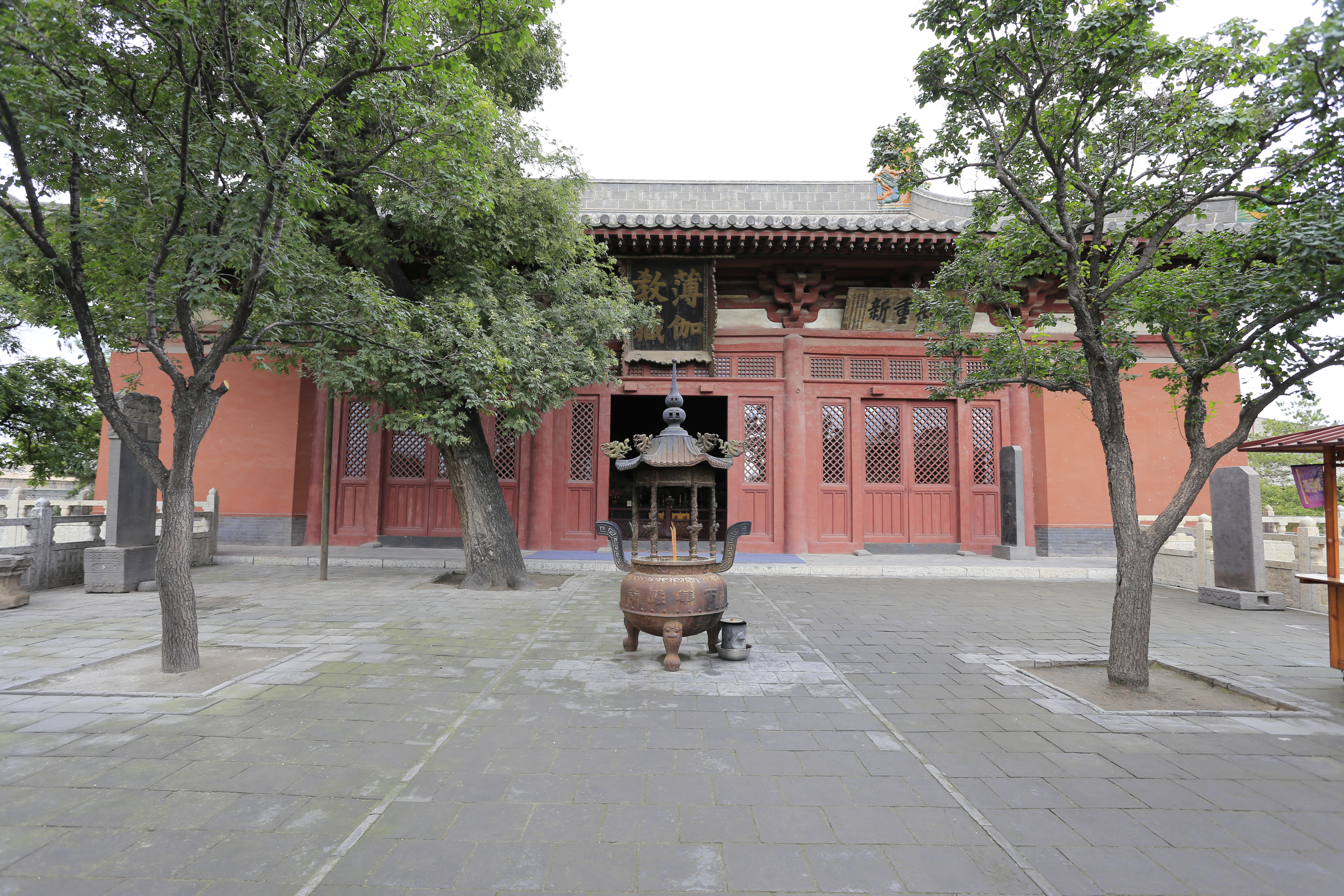
The Bojia Jiaozang Hall, built in 1038 during the Liao dynasty.

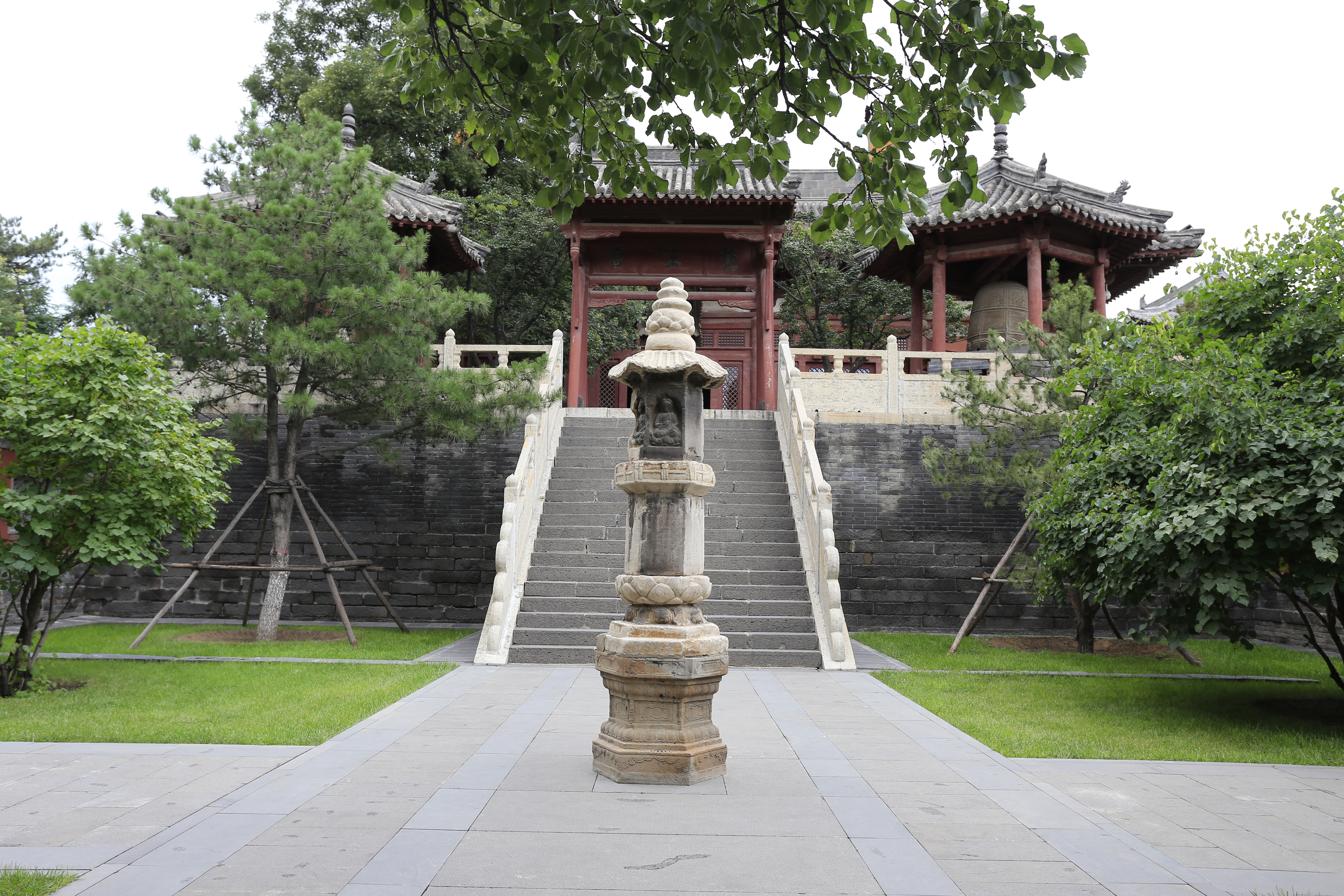
The Bell Tower in front of the Bojia Jiaozang Hall, also built during the Liao dynasty.

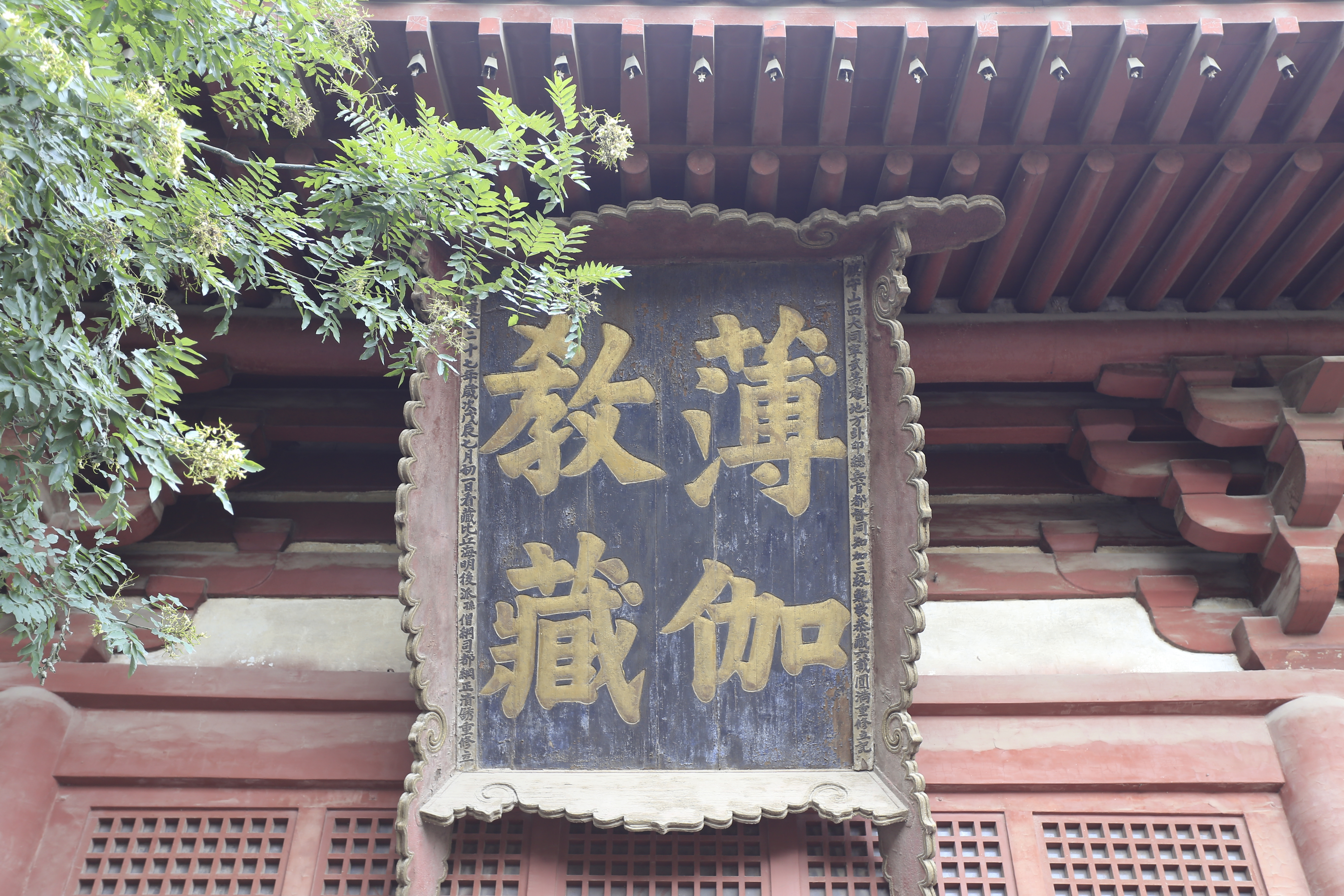
Plaque with the words "Bojia Jiaozang Hall" written on it, inscribed during the Qing dynasty

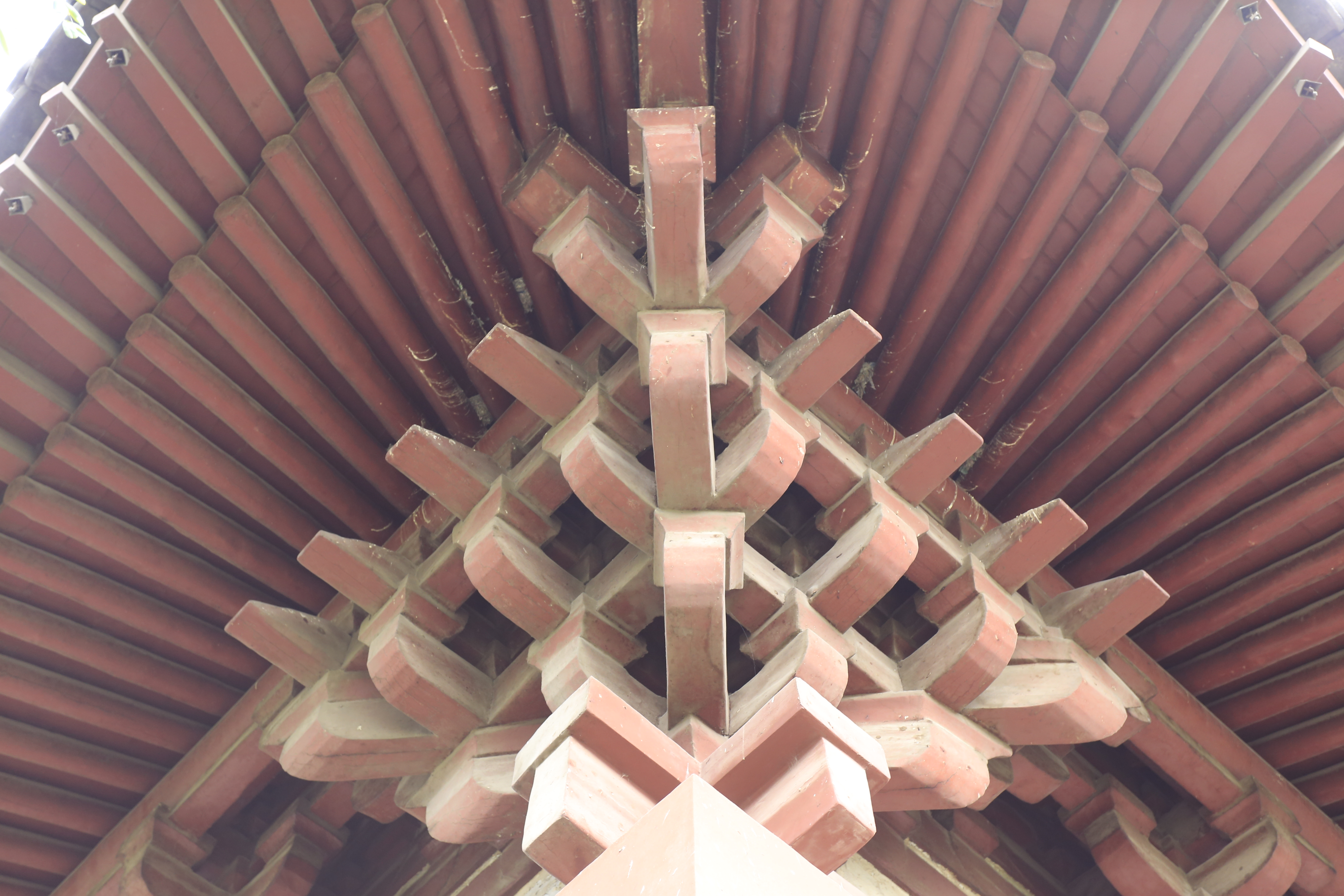
One of the Dougongs on the outer corner of the Bojia Jiaozang

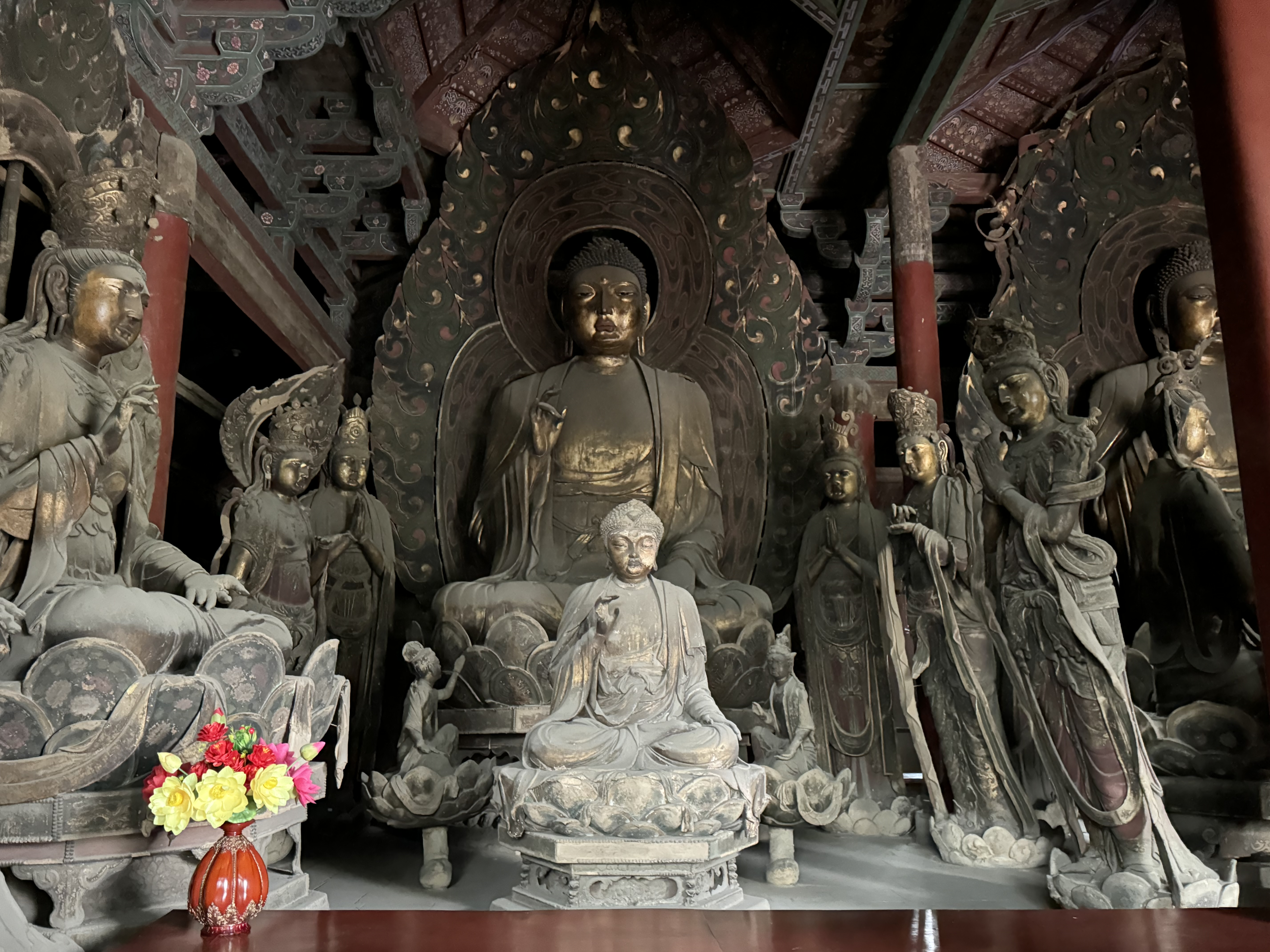
Liao dynasty statues of Randeng Fo flanked by multiple attendant Bodhisattvas, with a smaller Buddha statue enshrined in front

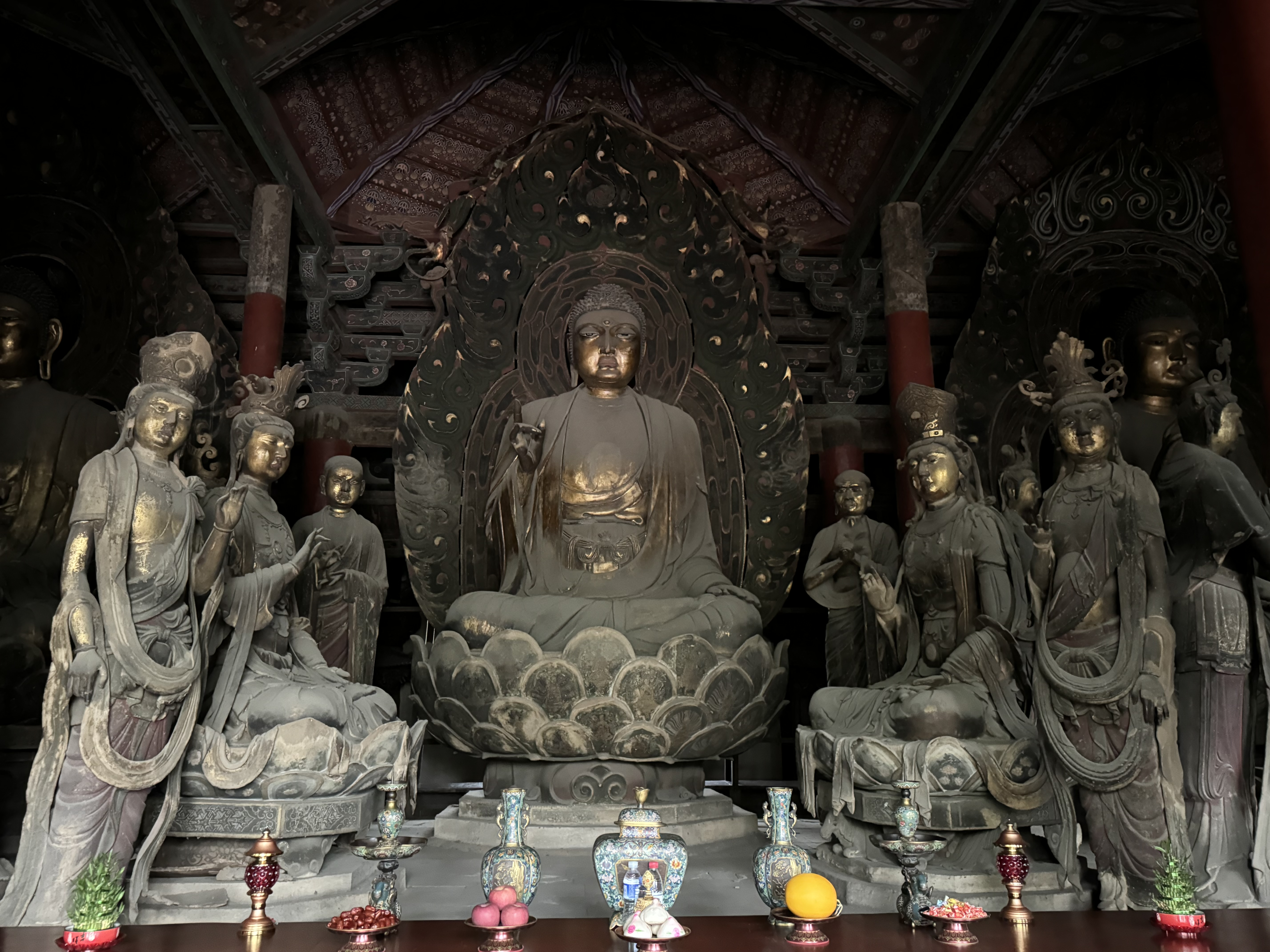
Liao dynasty statues of Shijiamouni flanked by multiple attendant Bodhisattvas and disciples

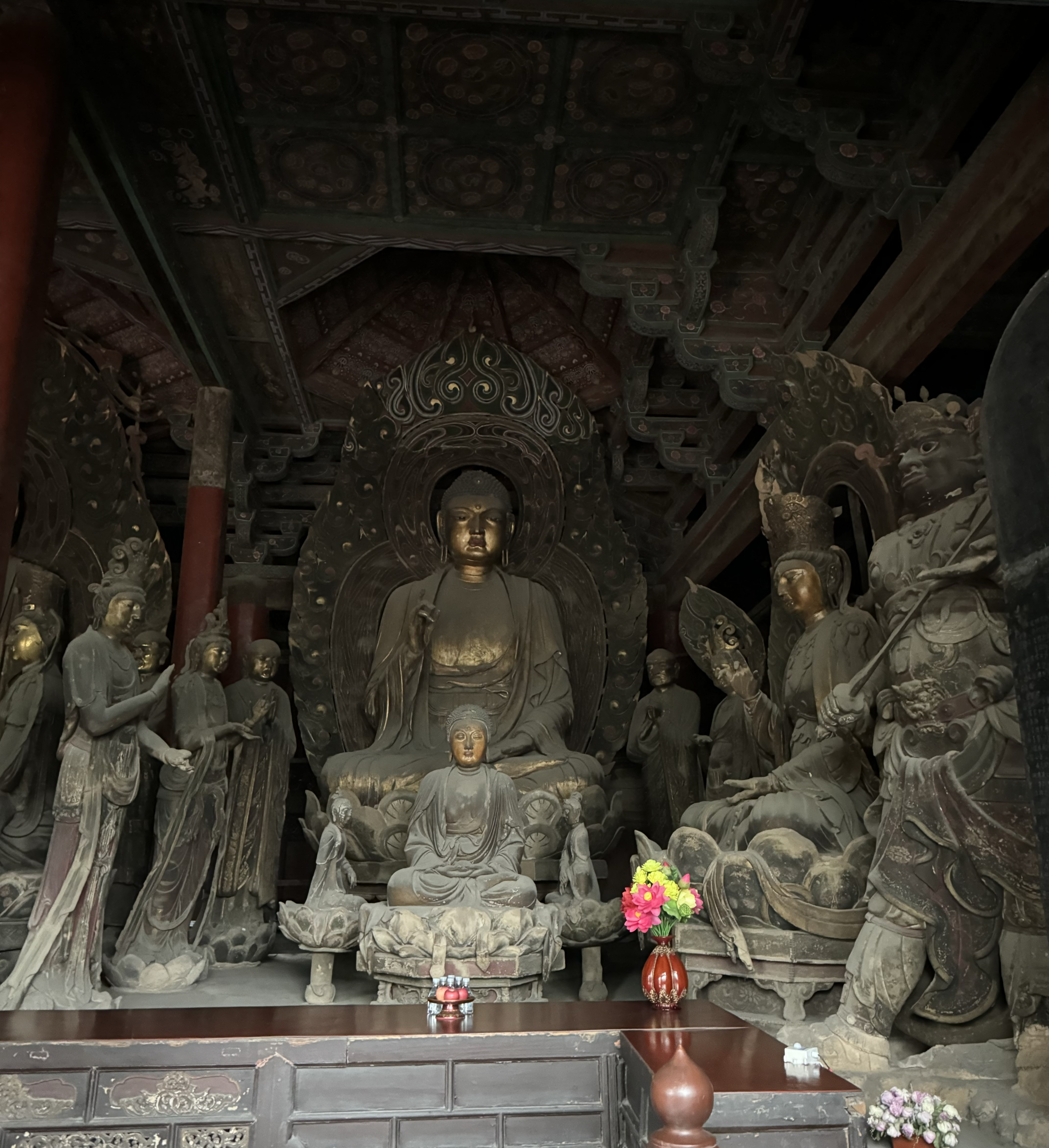
Liao dynasty statues of Mi Le Fo flanked by multiple attendant Bodhisattvas, with a smaller Buddha statue enshrined in front

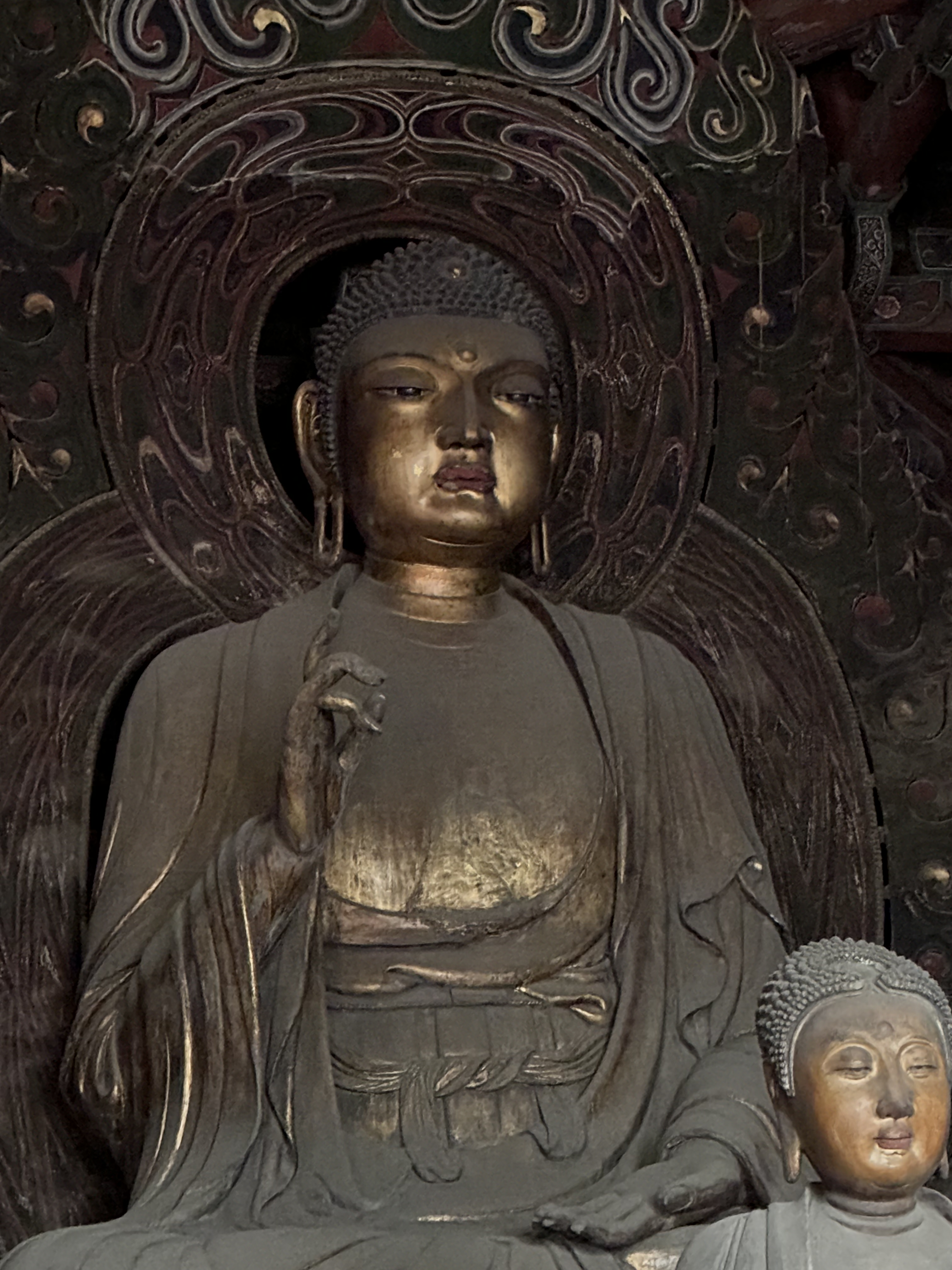
Liao dynasty statue of Mi Le Fo

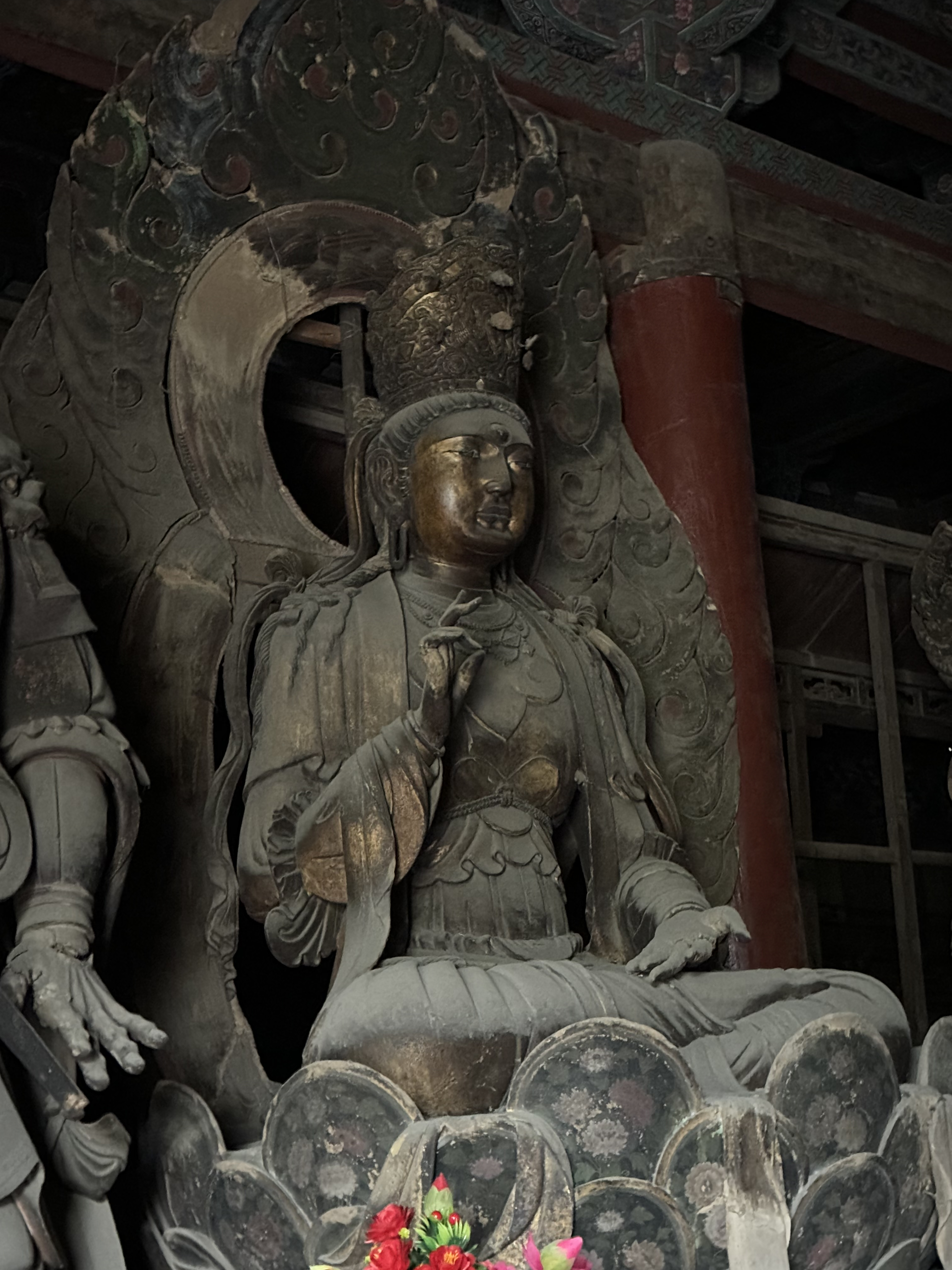
Liao dynasty statue of the Bodhisattva Dizang

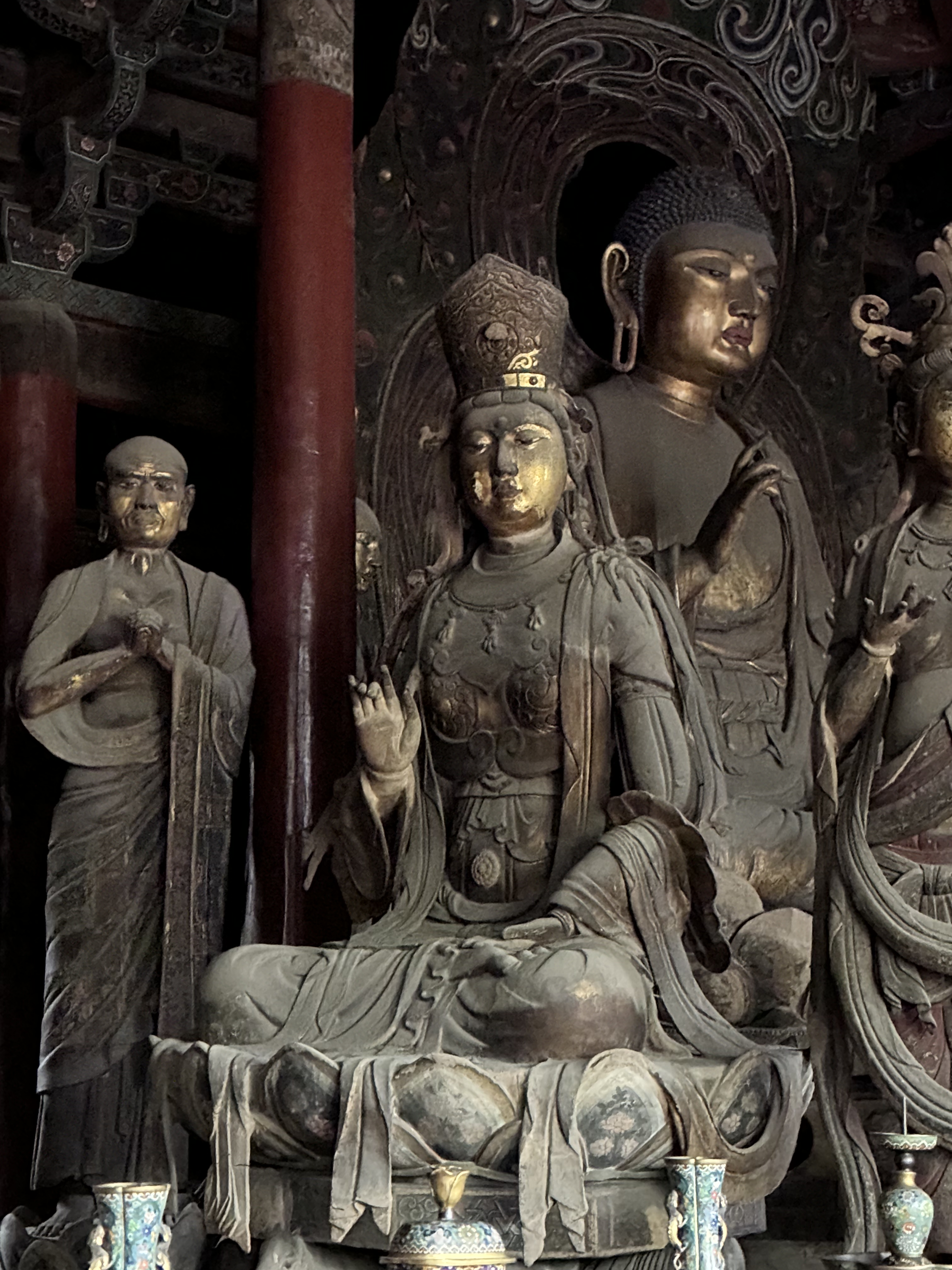
Liao dynasty statue of the Bodhisattva Wenshu

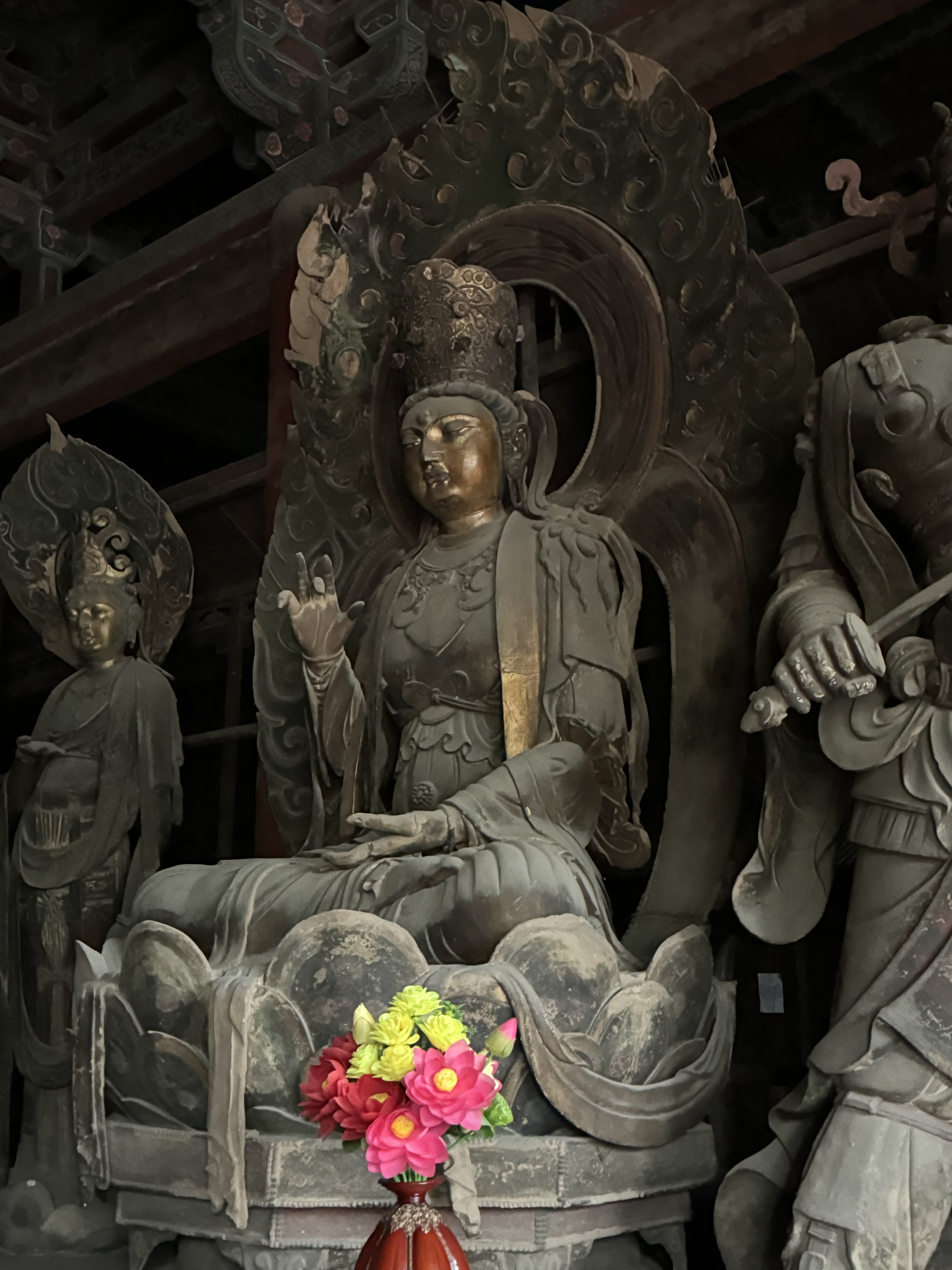
Liao dynasty statue of the Bodhisattva Guanyin

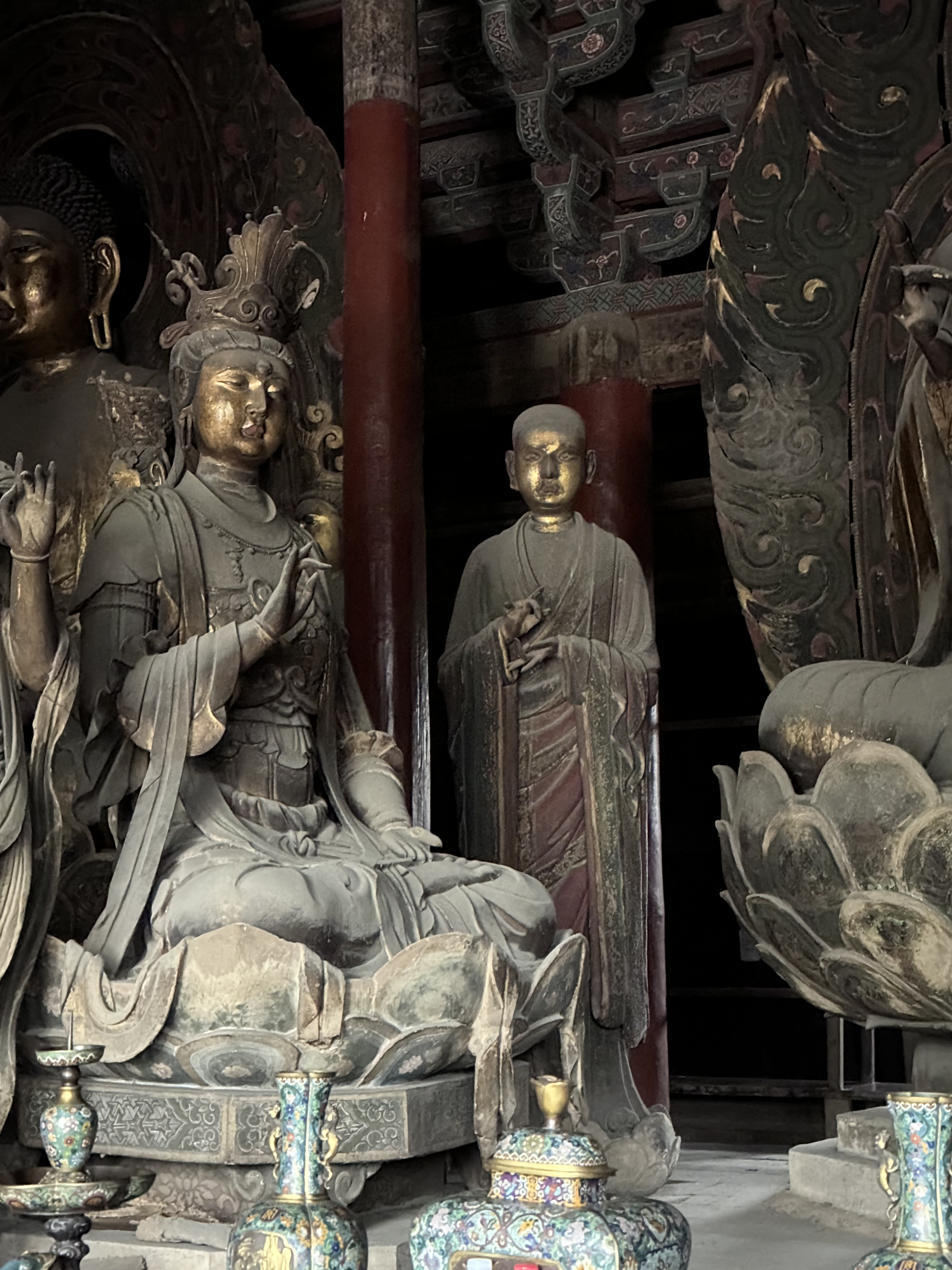
Liao dynasty statues of the Bodhisattva Puxian with a disciple

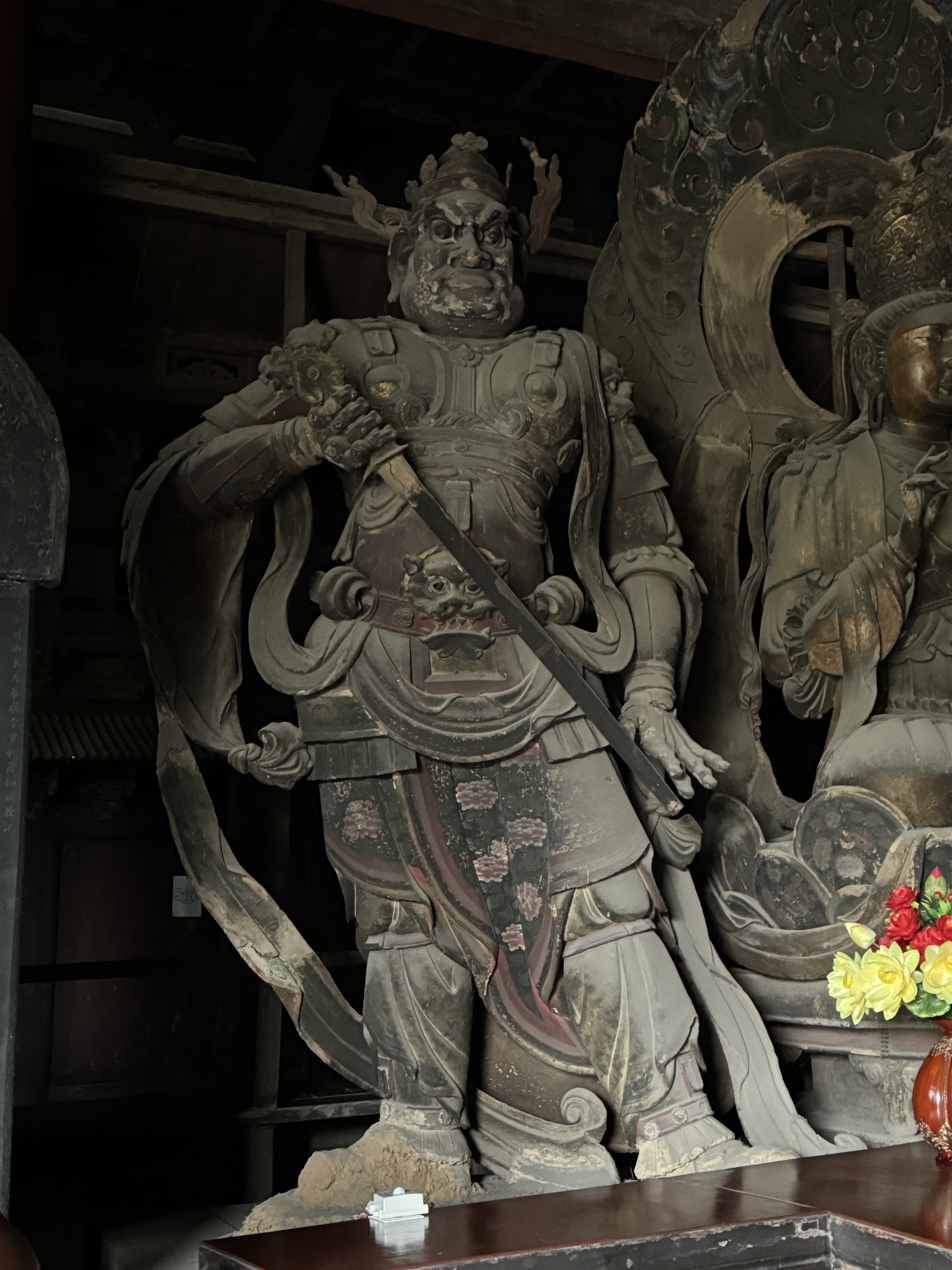
Liao dynasty statue of a Heavenly King

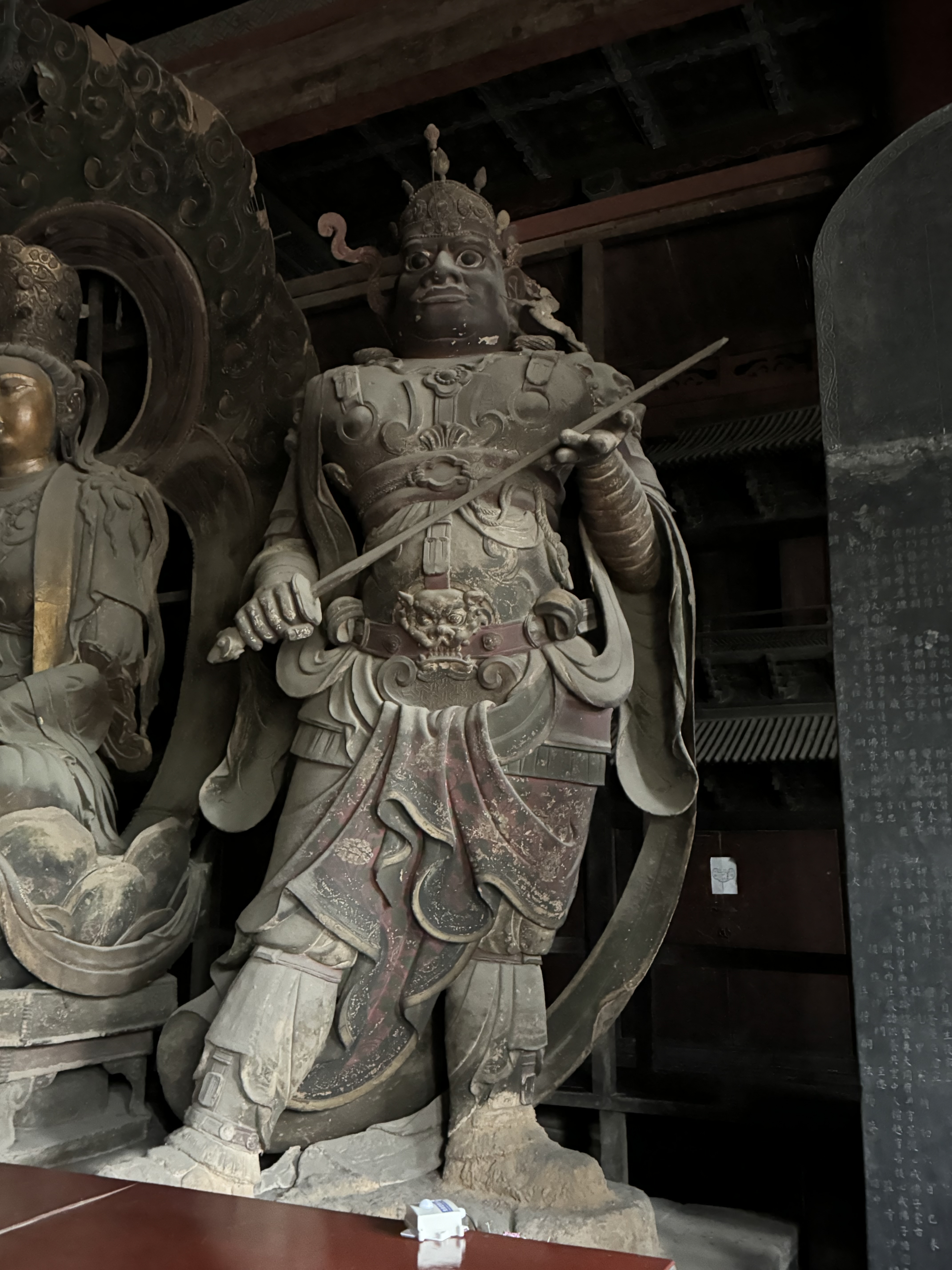
Liao dynasty statue of a Heavenly King

== Gallery ==
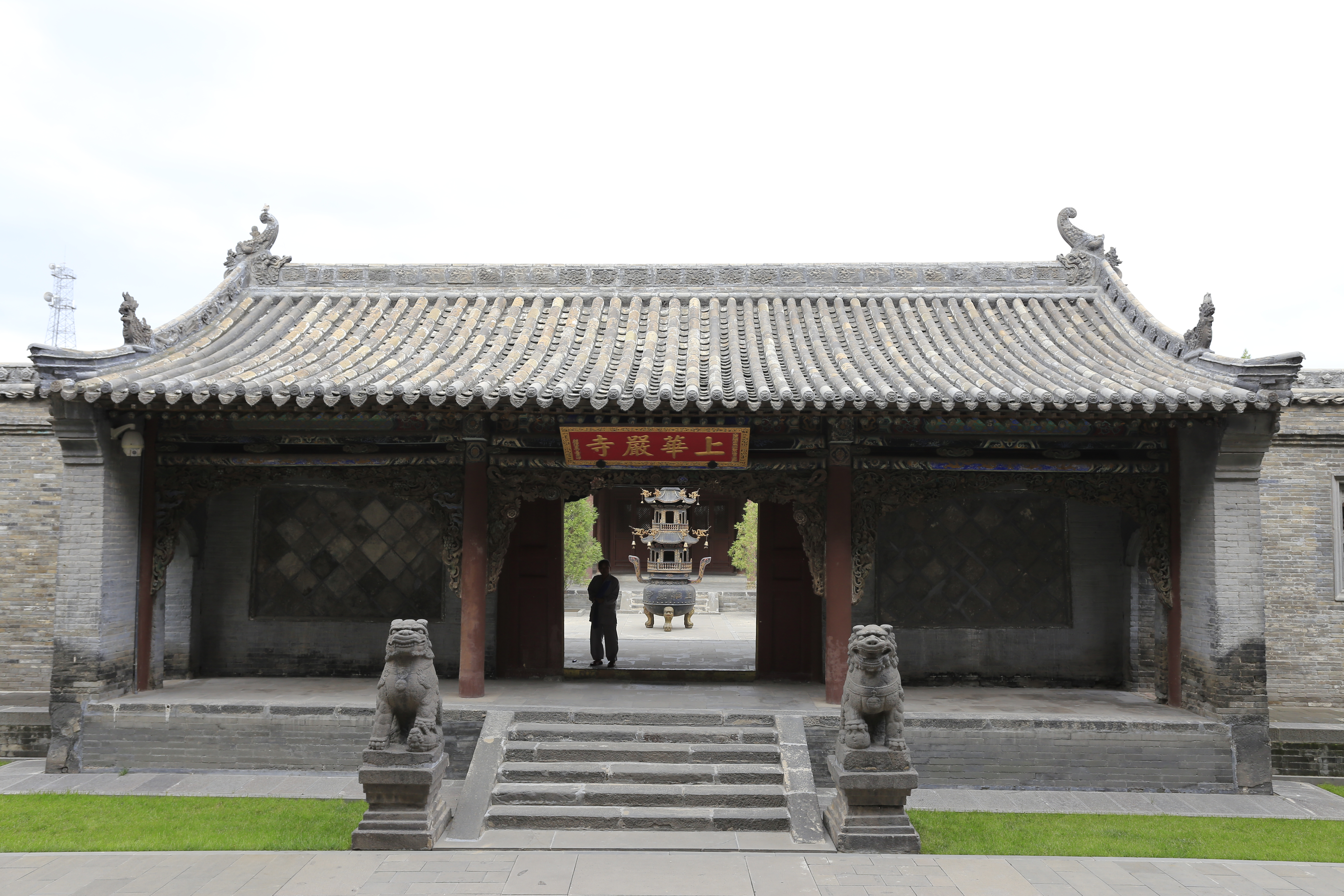
Qing dynasty period shanmen

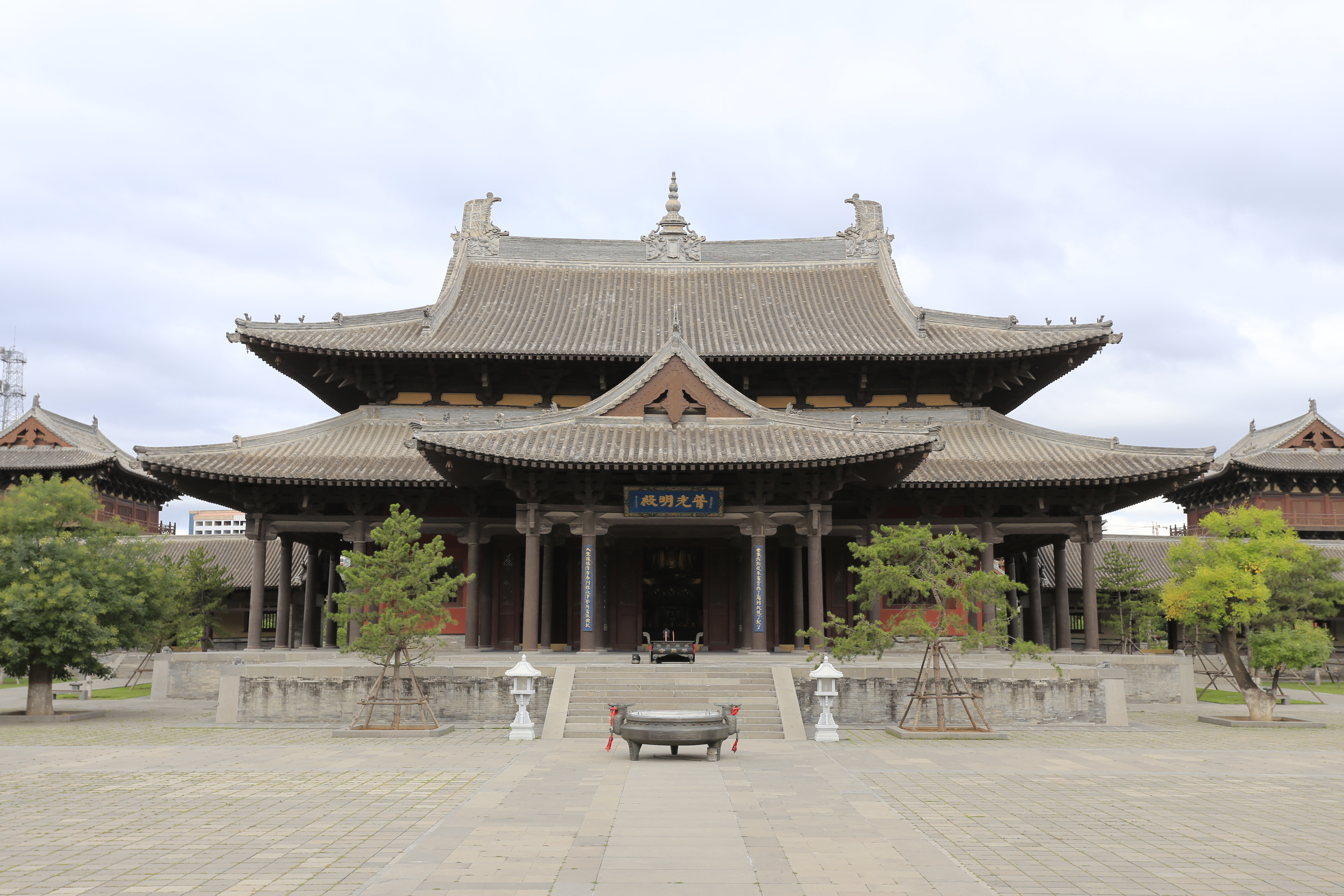
The Puguangming Hall (普光明殿) at Huayan Temple.

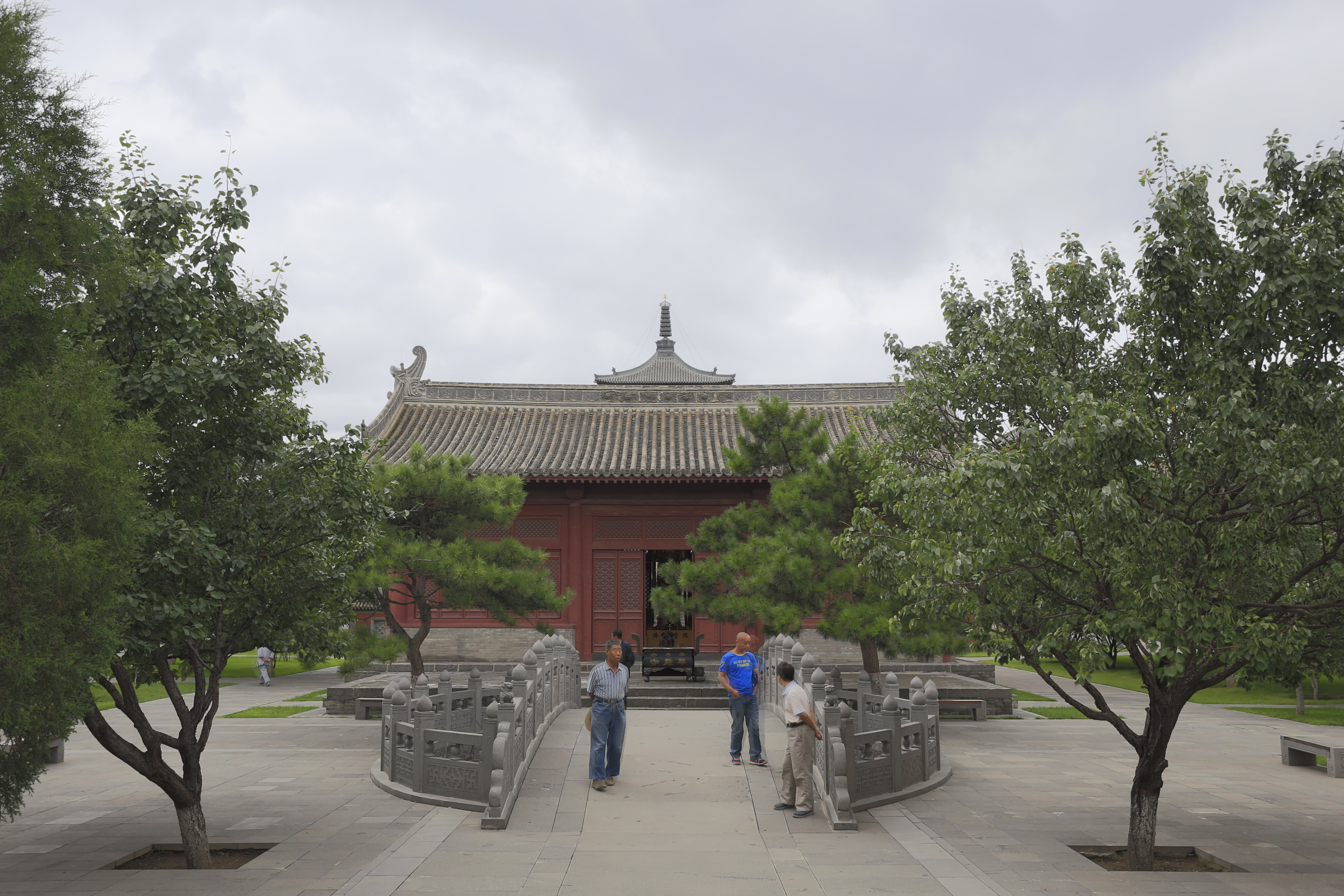
Qing dynasty period Guanyin Hall

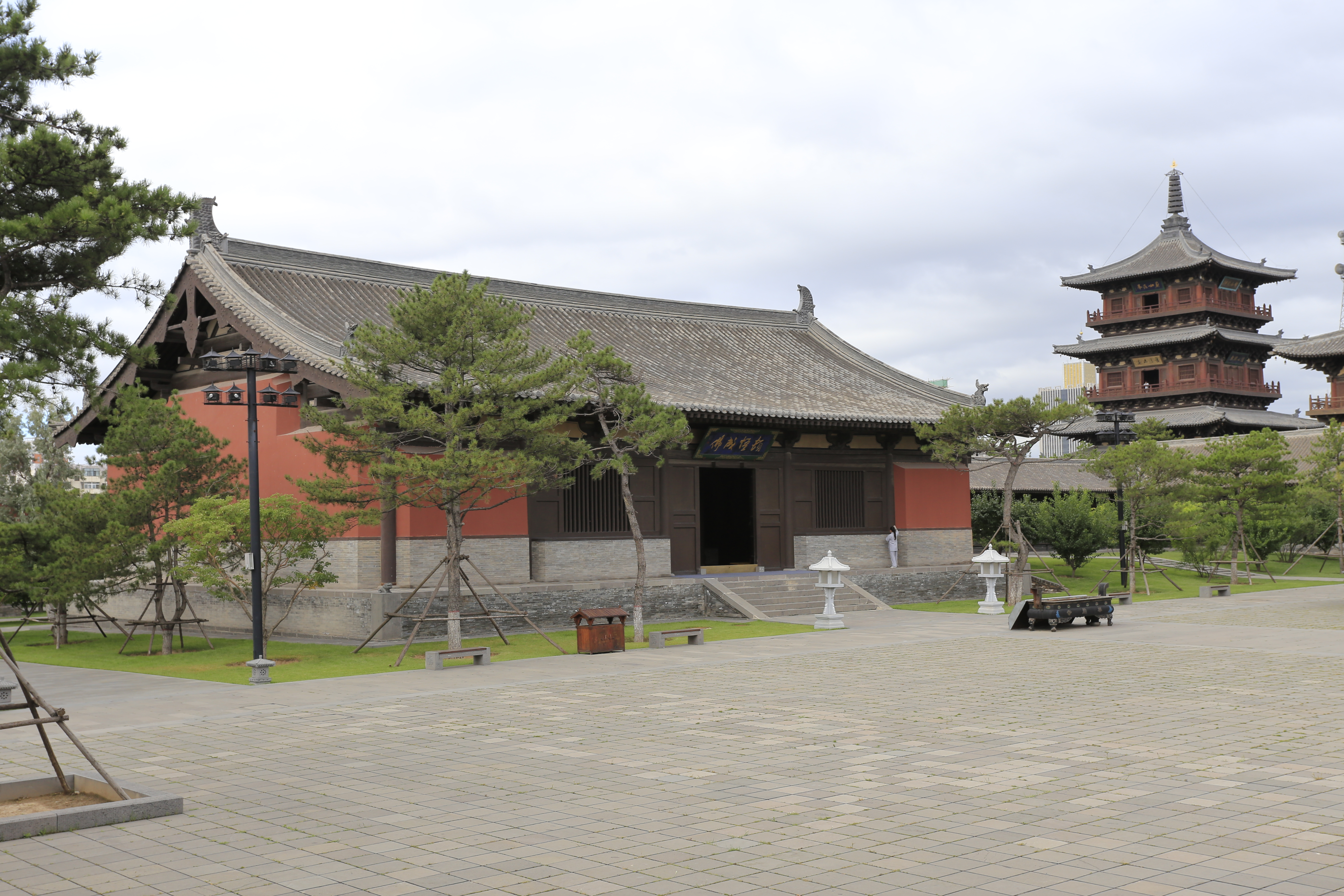
The Mituo Hall

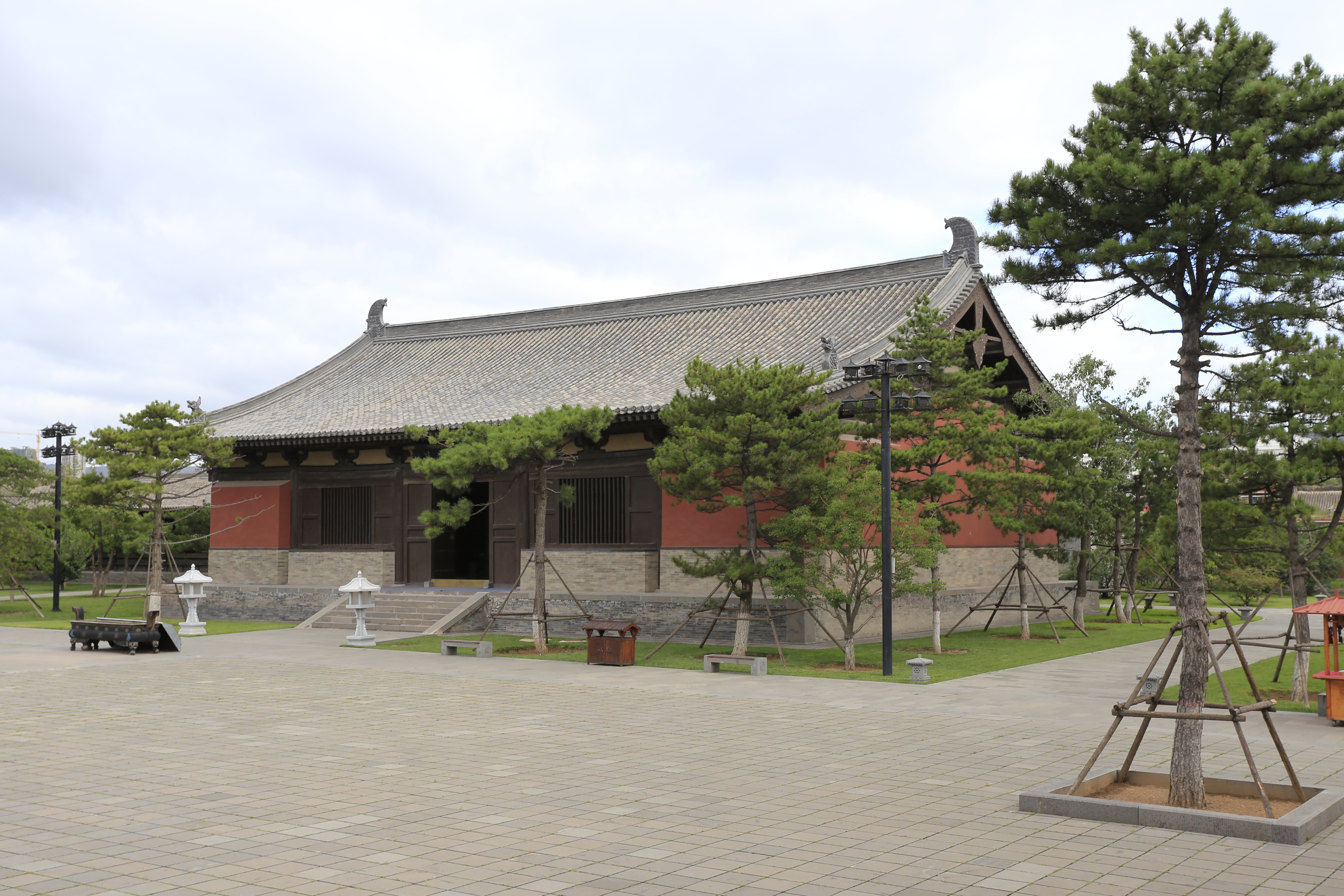
The Yaoshi Hall

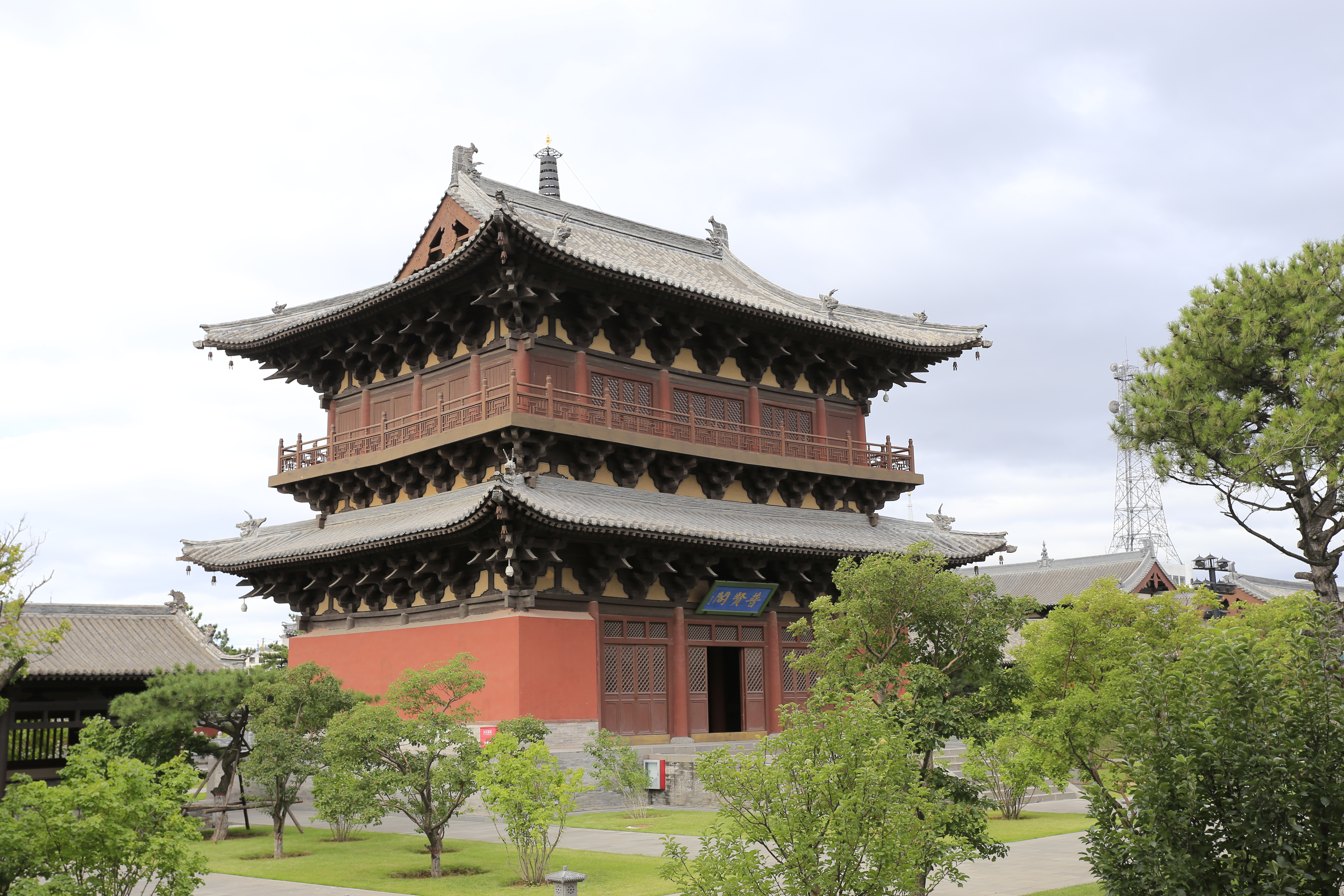
The Puxian Pavilion

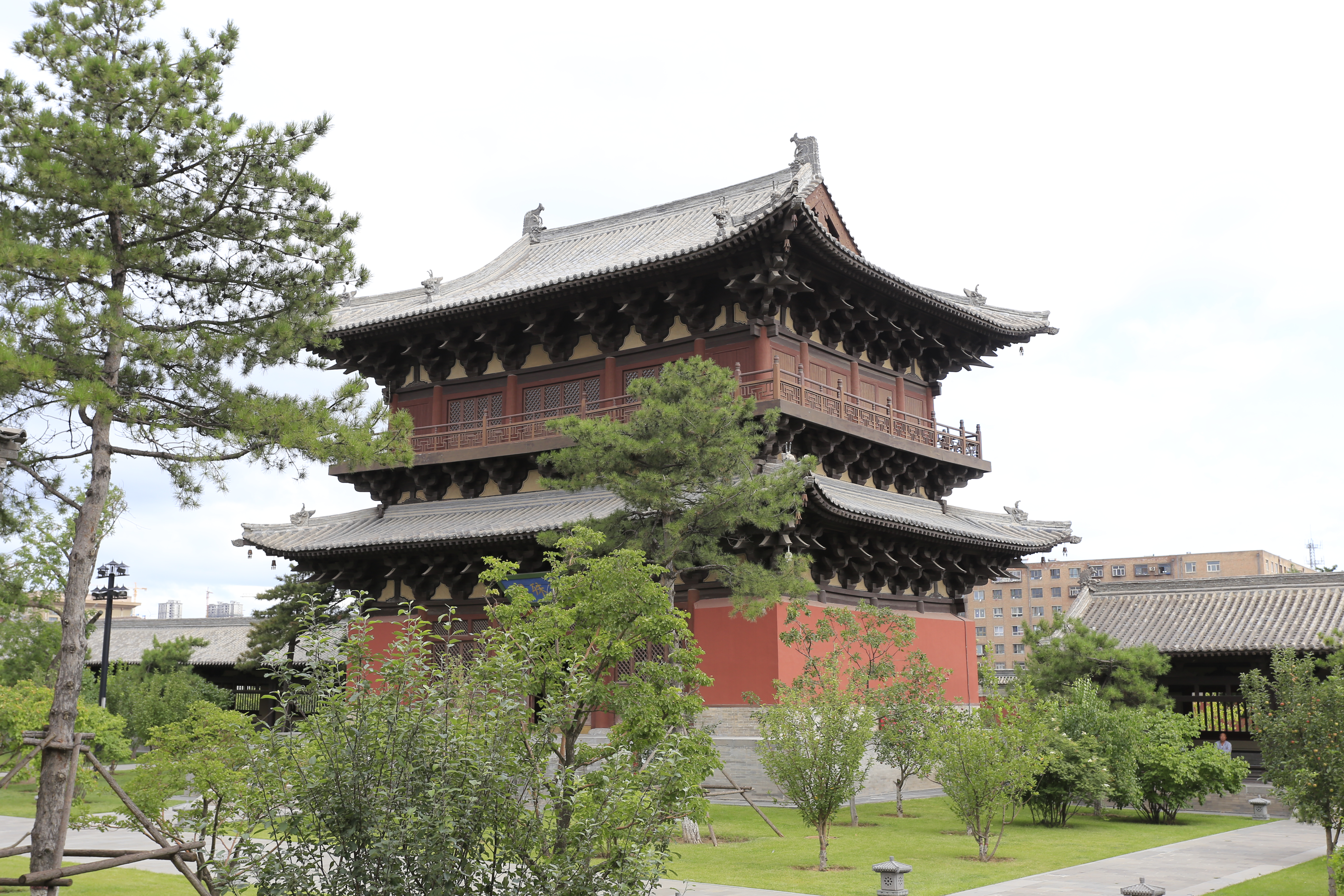
The Wenshu Pavilion

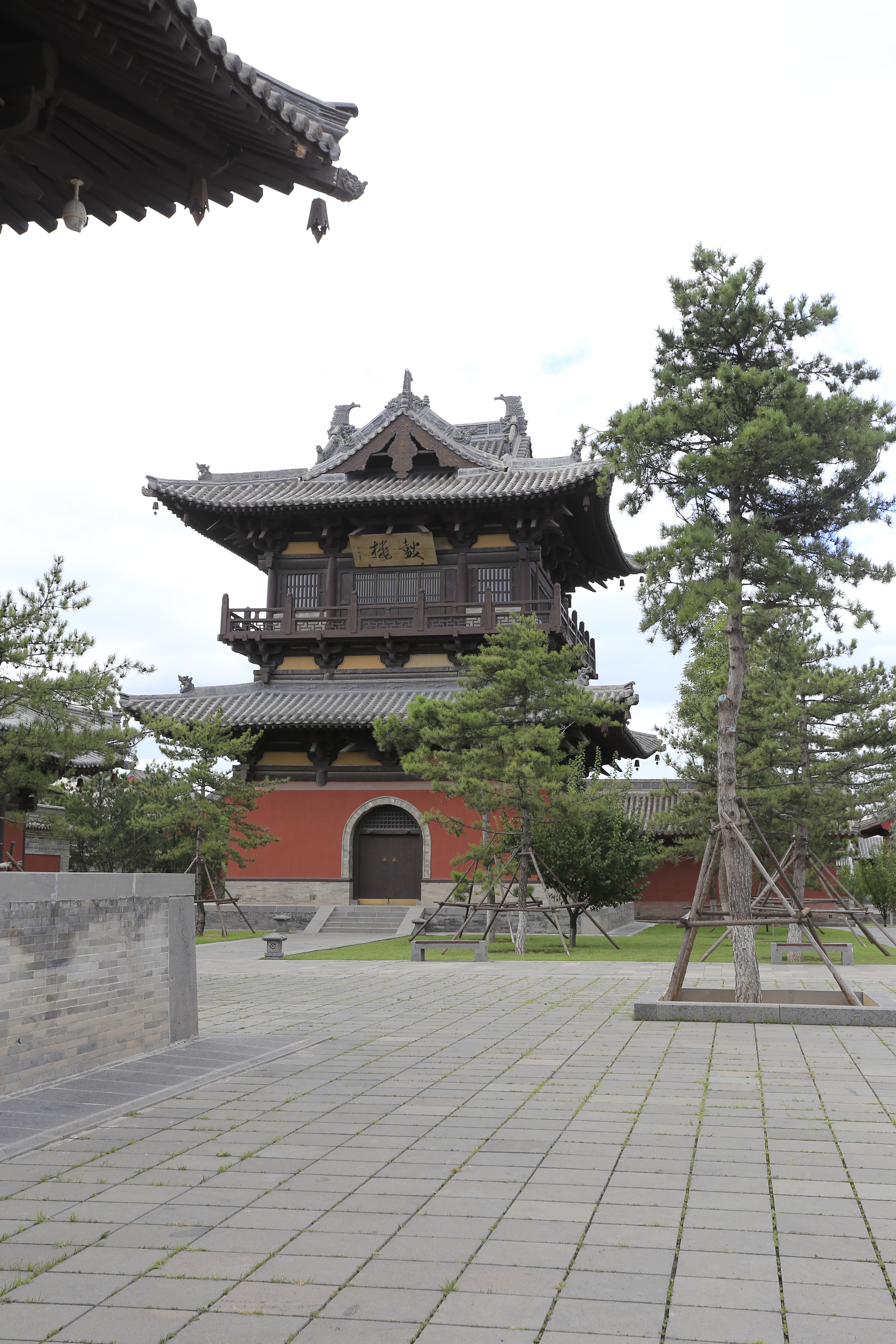
The drum tower

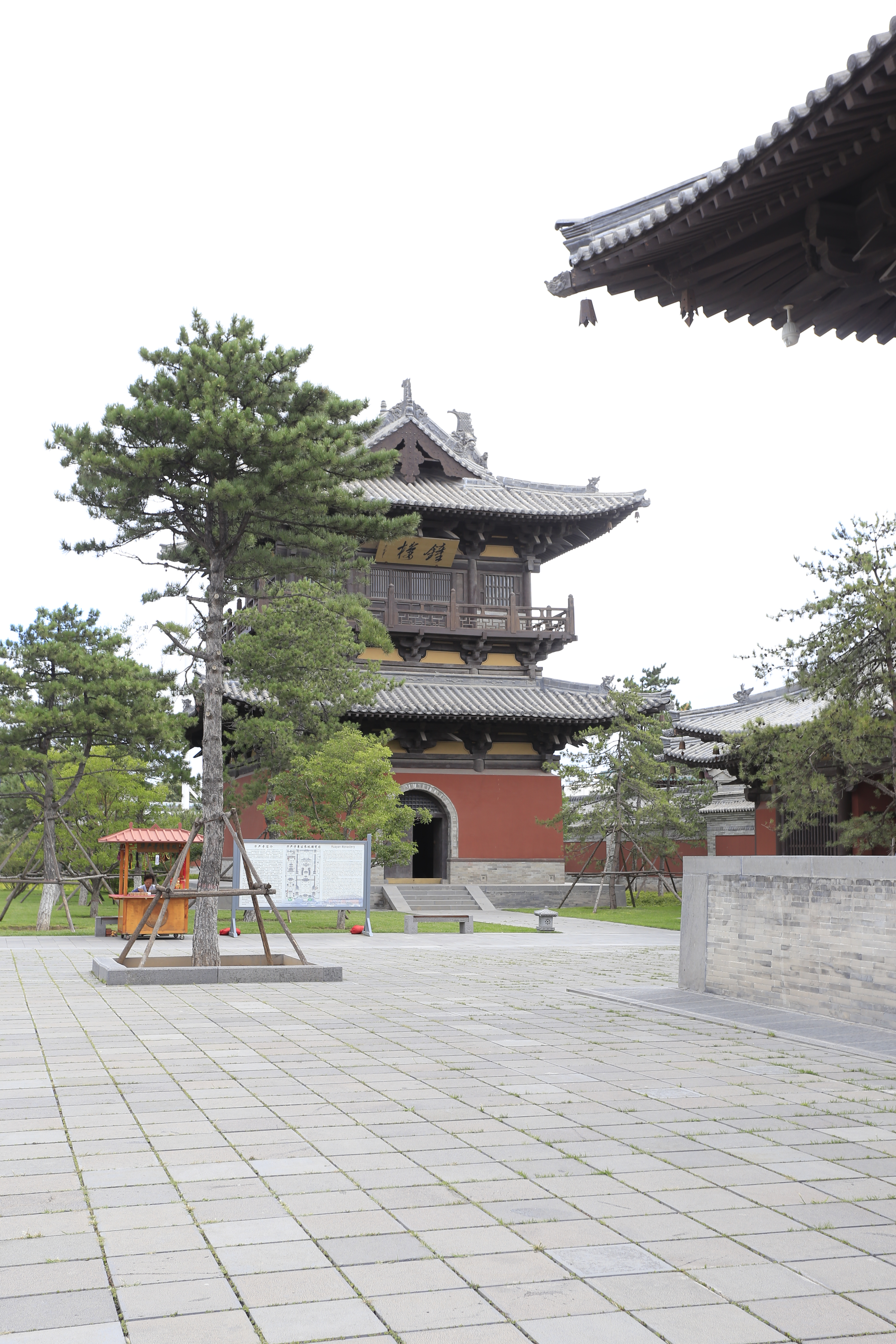
The bell tower

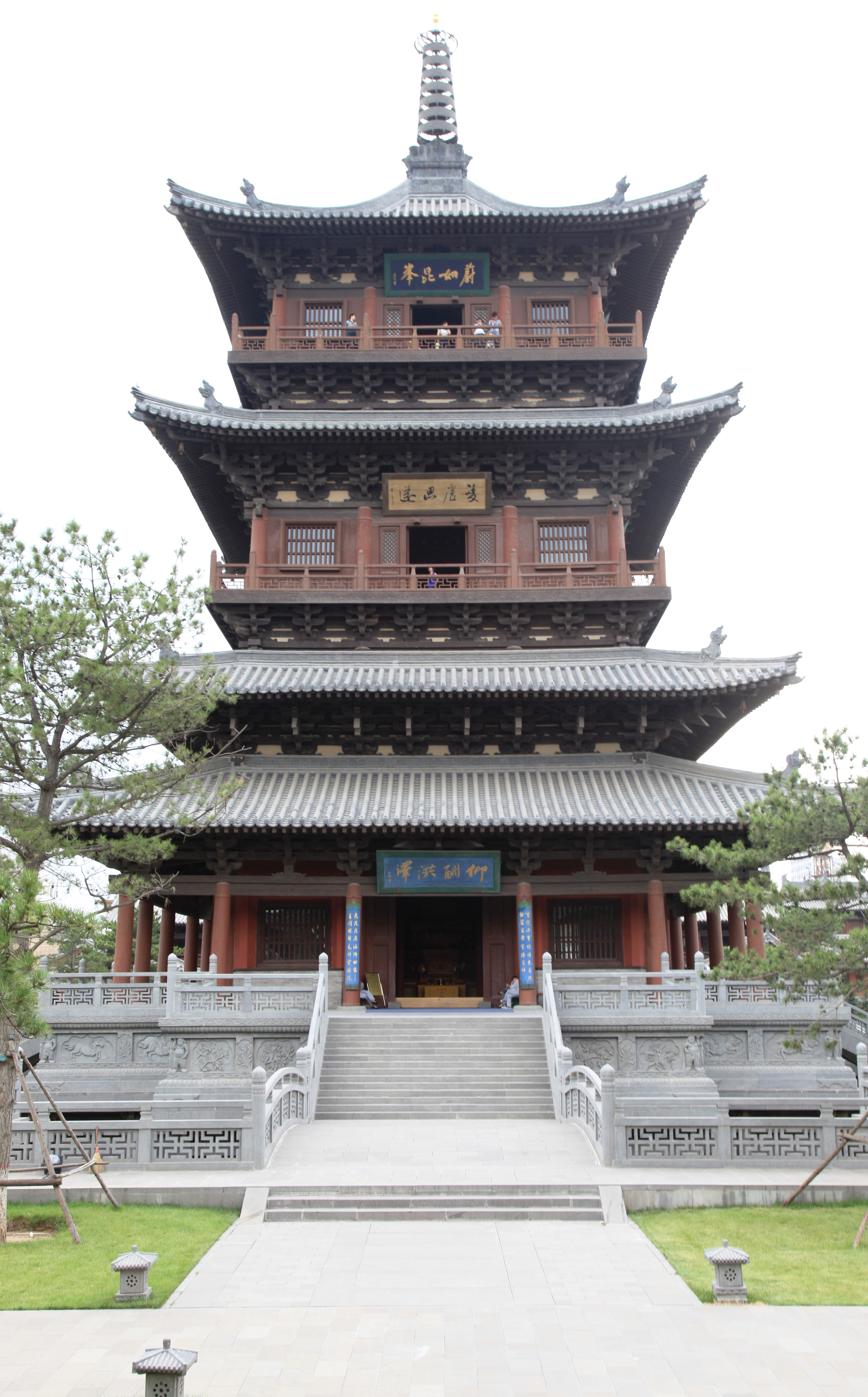
A wood pagoda at Huayan Temple.

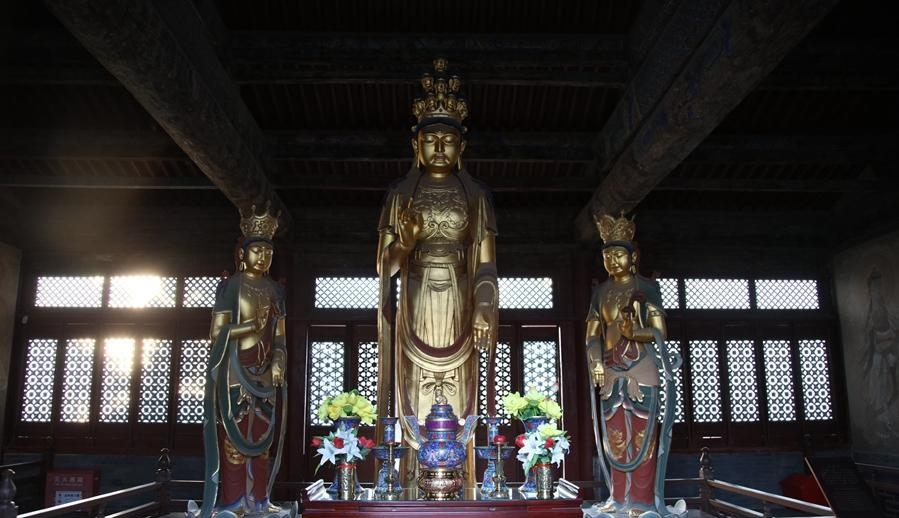
Shrine to a statue of Shiyimian Guanyin (Chinese: 十一面觀音; pinyin: Shíyīmiàn Guānyīn), a manifestation of Guanyin the eleven head, in the temple

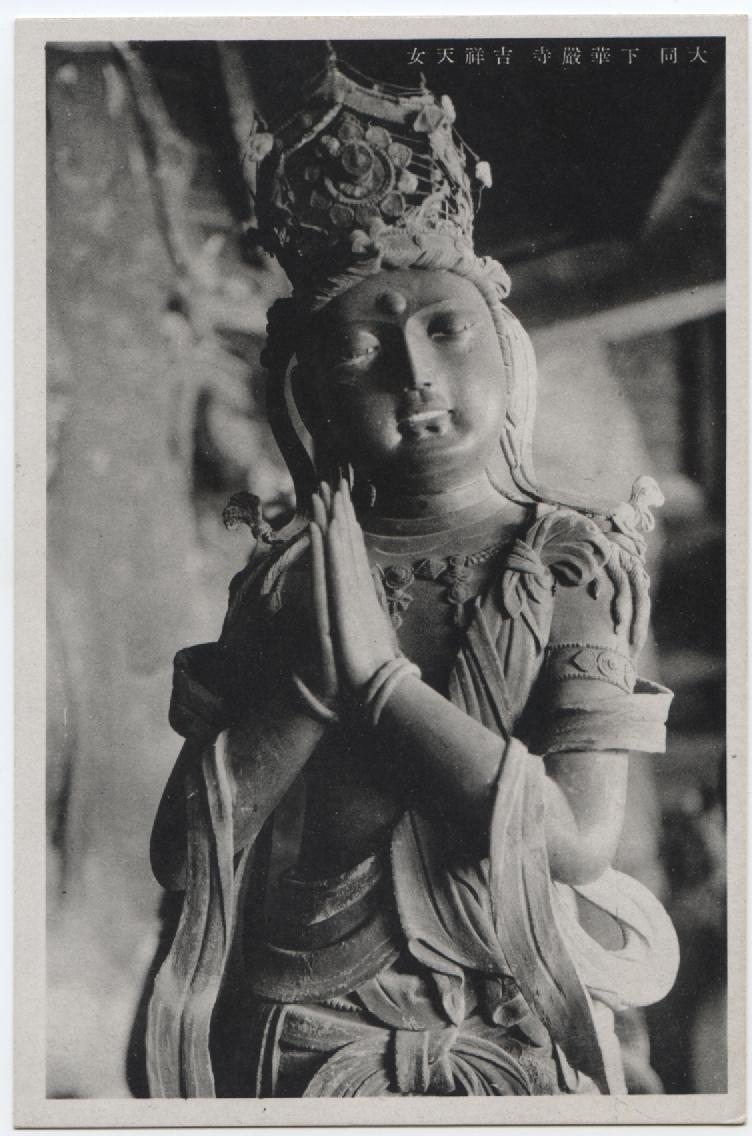
Statue of Palden Lhamo (Jixiang Tiannu) at Huayan Temple, 1937-1945
