= Five Tathāgatas =

Representations of the five qualities of the Adi-Buddha

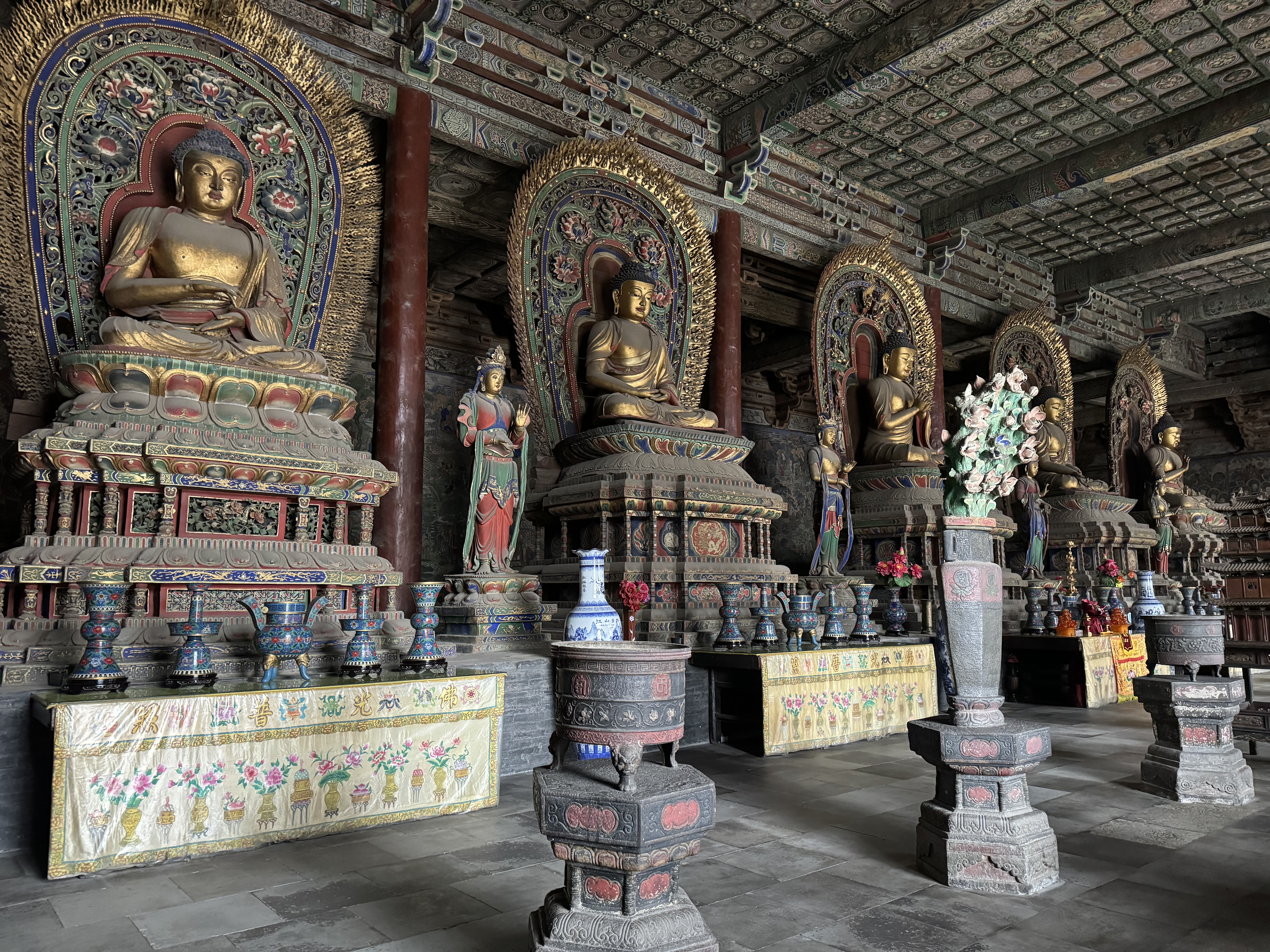
Ming dynasty (1368–1644) statues of the Five Tathāgatas in Shanhua Temple in Datong, Shanxi, China. From left to right: Ratnasambhava, Amitābha, Vairocana, Akshobhya, Amoghasiddhi

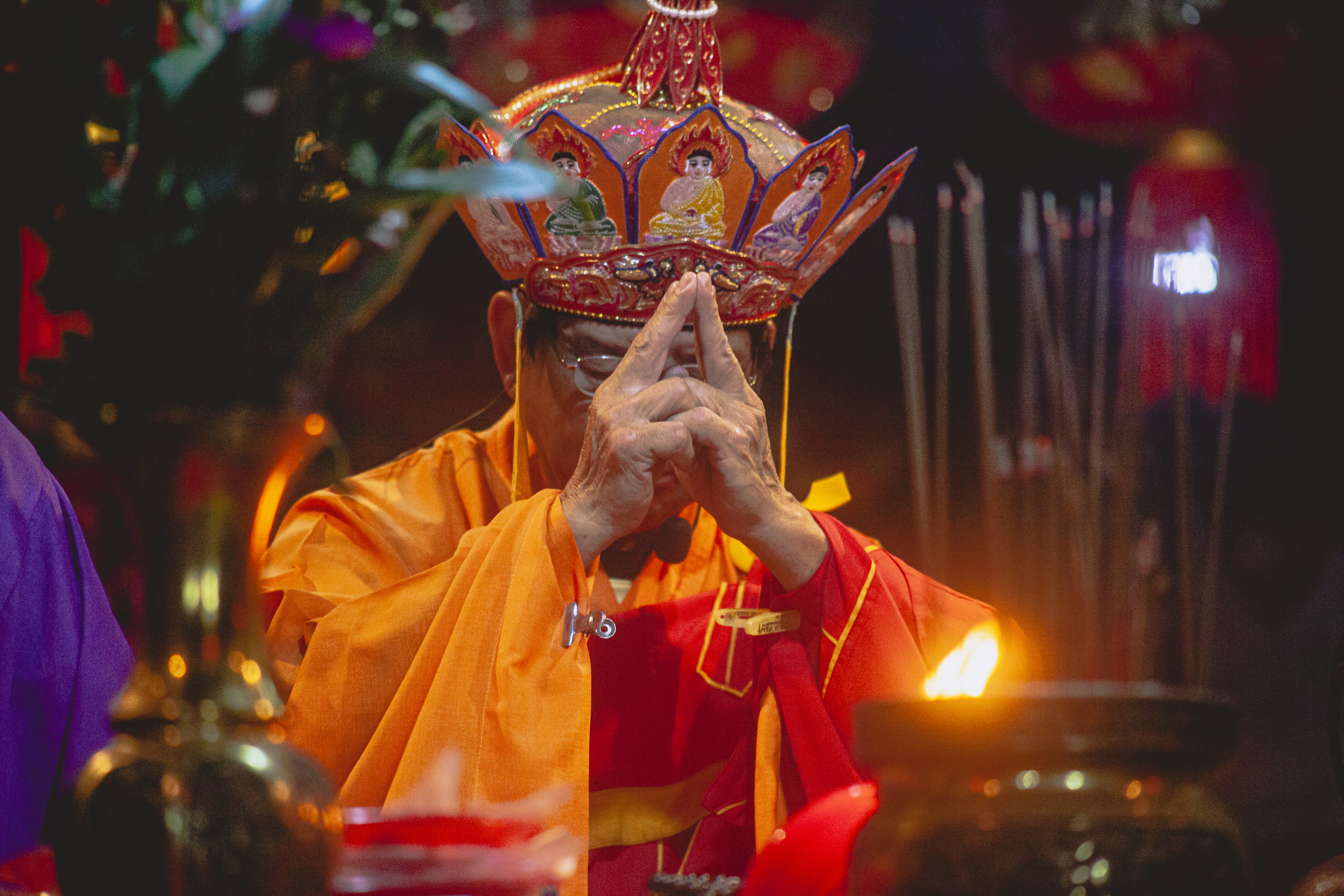
A vajrācārya wearing a crown adorned with images of the Five Tathāgatas during the performance of a Yujia Yankou ritual, an esoteric Chinese Buddhist rite

In Mahayana and Vajrayana Buddhism, the Five Tathāgatas (Skt: पञ्चतथागत, pañcatathāgata); (Ch: 五方佛, Wǔfāngfó) or Five Wisdom Tathāgatas (Ch: 五智如来, Wǔzhì Rúlái); (Mn: Язгуурын таван бурхан, Yazguuryn Tavan Burkhan) , are the five cardinal male and female Buddhas that are inseparable co-equals, although the male cardinal Buddhas are more often represented. Collectively, the male and female Buddhas are known as the Five Buddha Families (pañcabuddhakula).

The five are also called the Five Great Buddhas or the Five Jinas (Skt. for "conqueror" or "victor"). They are understood to manifest in humans as Five Wisdom Energies, which are both personality tendencies and corresponding enlightened states of being.

== Five Buddhas of the Five Directions ==
The Five Buddha Families are a common subject of Vajrayana and Tibetan Buddhist mandalas and they feature prominently in various Buddhist Tantras as the intrinsically inseparable father and mother Buddhas. Various sources provide different names for these Buddhas, though the most common names today are: In the east, Akshobhya; in the south Ratnasambhava; in the west, Amitābha; in the north Amoghasiddhi; and in the center Vairocana. They are sometimes seen as emanations and representations of the five qualities of the Adi-Buddha or "first Buddha", which is associated with the Dharmakāya. Some sources also include this "first Buddha" as a sixth Buddha along with the five.

The Five Tathāgatas are also venerated in East Asian Buddhist traditions. In Japanese Buddhism, the Five Tathagathas are the primary objects of realization and meditation in Shingon Buddhism, a school of Vajrayana Buddhism founded by Kōbō Daishi. In Chinese Buddhism, veneration of the five Buddhas has dispersed from Chinese Esoteric Buddhism into other Chinese Buddhist traditions like Chan Buddhism and Tiantai. They are enshrined in many Chinese Buddhist temples, and regularly invoked in rituals such as the Shuilu Fahui and the Yujia Yankou ritual, as well as in general prayers and chants.

They are also sometimes called the "Dhyani-buddhas", which is a term first recorded in English by Brian Houghton Hodgson, a British resident in Nepal, in the early 19th century, and is unattested in any surviving traditional primary sources.

Five Directions	East	West	South	North	Center
Five Buddhas					
Five Buddhas	Aksobhya Buddha	Amitabha Buddha	Ratna-sambhava Buddha	Amogha-siddhi Buddha	Vairocana Buddha
Five Families	Vajra Family	Padma (Lotus) Family	Ratna (Jewel) Family	Karma Family	Buddha Family
Five Wisdoms	Grand Round Mirror Wisdom	Miraculous Observing Wisdom	Equality Wisdom	Achievement of actions Wisdom	Dharma Realm's body and nature Wisdom
Five Wisdoms	Ādarśa-jñāna	Pratyavekṣaṇa-jñāna	Samatā-jñāna	Krtyānusthāna-jñāna	Dharma-dhātu-svabhāva-jñāna
Five Wisdoms	大圓鏡智	妙觀察智	平等性智	成所作智	法界體性智
Five Luminous Kings	Trailokyavijaya	Yamantaka	Kuṇḍali	Vajrayakṣa	Acala

== History ==
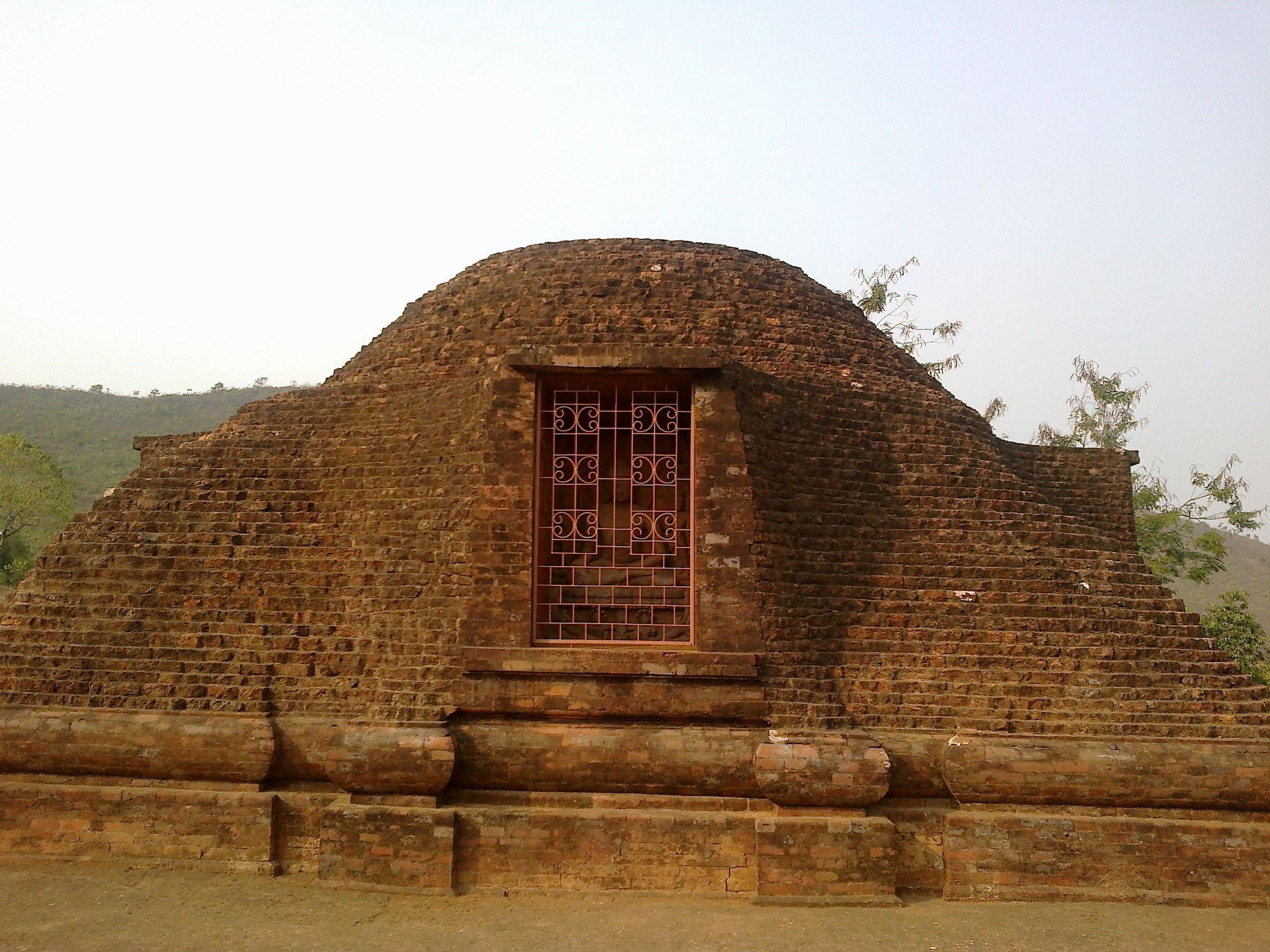
Main stupa at Udayagiri Buddhist Complex with four Buddhas enshrined at four niches facing the four cardinal directions

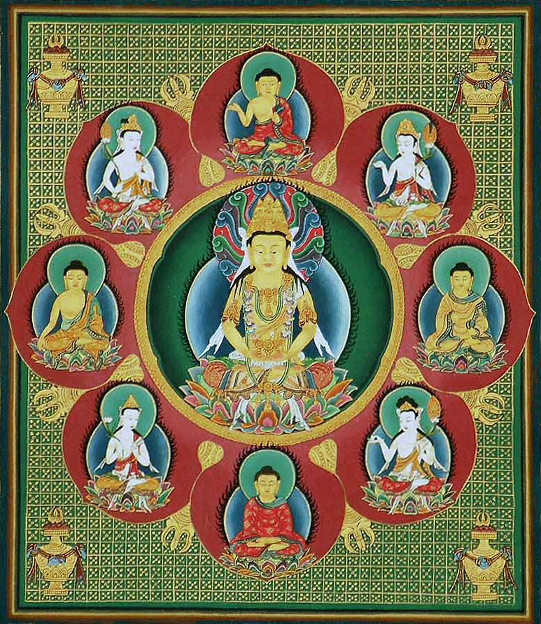
The Garbhadhatu Mandala with Vairochana, surrounded by (clockwise from top): Ratnaketu, Samantabhadra, Samkusumitaraja, Manjushri, Amitabha, Avalokiteshvara, Divyadundhubhimeghanirghosa, Maitreya.

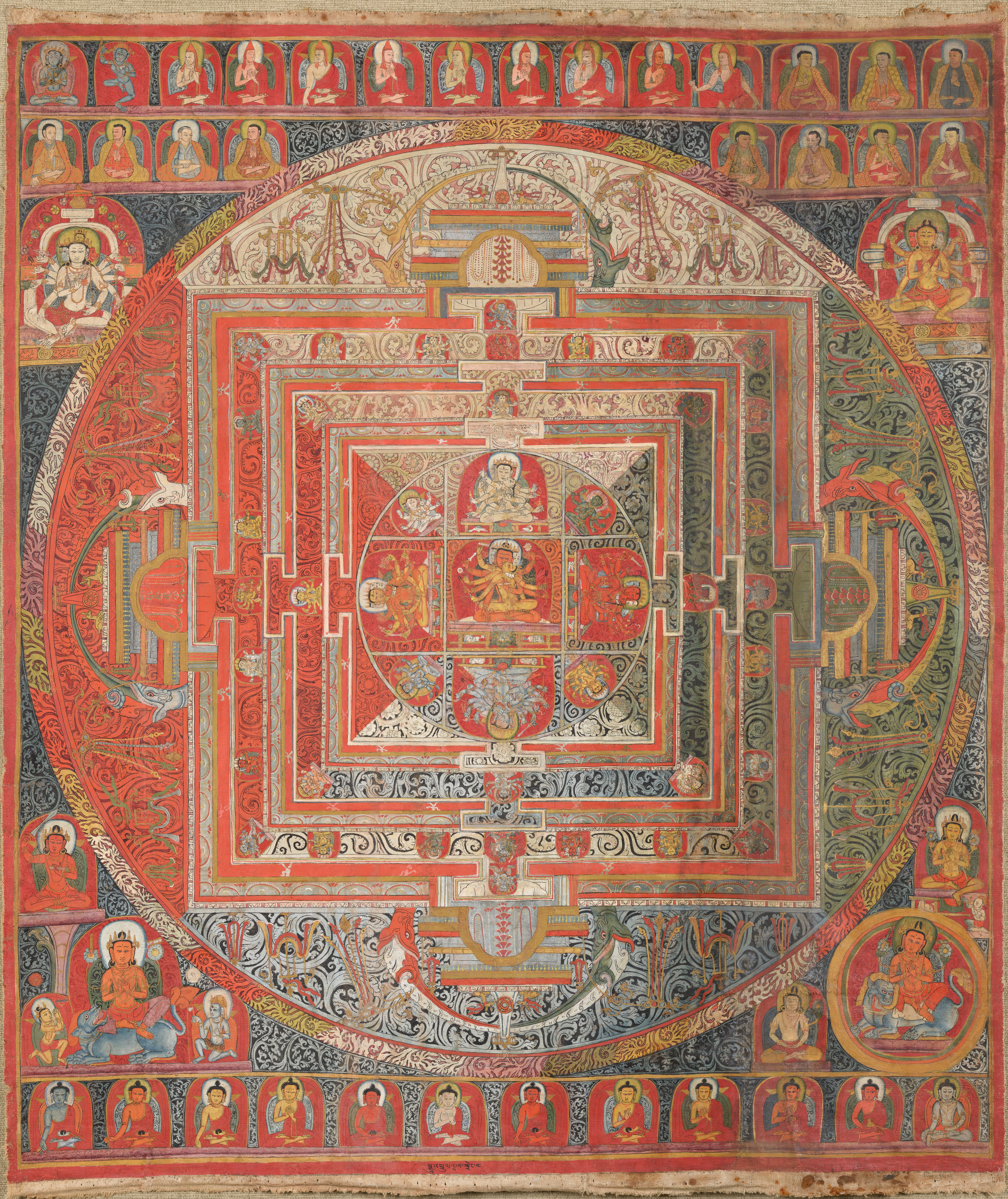
Guhyasamaja mandala with Mañjuvajra at the center

The Five Wisdom Buddha families are a development of the mature Buddhist Tantras. The now standard five Buddhas first appear in the Sarvatathāgatatattvasaṃgraha sutra (Compendium of Principles, c. late 7th century) and Vajrasekhara Sutra.

However, the tradition of various Buddhas corresponding to the main cardinal directions is not new to the Buddhist tantras. The idea appears in Mahayana sutras like the Sutra of Golden Light (c. 5th century) and the Sukhāvatīvyūha Sūtra. The Golden Light for example, has a mandala with Shakyamuni in the center, surrounded by Ratnaketu (south), Amitayus (west), Dundubhisvara (north) and Aksobhya (east) Buddhas. This set already includes three of the main five Buddha family Buddhas found in the tantras.

Furthermore, examples of four Buddhas arranged in the four cardinal directions are found in Indian Buddhist stupas like Sanchi stupa, Udayagiri stupa, Jajpur stupa (Pushpagiri) and Dekhinath stupa (Gyaraspur). The Udayagiri stupa for example, houses Vairocana, Amitabha, Aksobhya and Ratnasambhava in the four cardinal directions of the stupa.

According to Kimiaki Tanaka, this basic four cardinal directions Buddha model, combined with Vairocana Buddha from the Avatamsaka sutra, developed into the later tantric five Buddha families (which changed the other two Buddhas' names to Amoghasiddhi and Ratnasambhava).

Before the set of the Compendium of Principles became the most popular, there were numerous slightly different schemas with different Buddha names. The Vairocanābhisaṃbodhi Sūtra for example contains a slightly different set of Buddhas, with Samkusumitarajendra, and Ratnaketu in place of Amoghasiddhi and Ratnasambhava. Similarly, the Amoghapāśakalparāja (Sovereign Ritual of Amoghapāśa) has a similar schema as the Compendium, except that Shakyamuni is at the center, not Vairocana, and furthermore Amoghasiddhi is replaced by Lokendraraja Buddha.

Later Buddhist tantras adopted the basic five Buddha family schema. The Māyājālatantra for example, adopts it wholesale. Other tantras would often modify the basic schema to suit their needs. For example, the Guhyasamaja literature places Aksobhya Buddha (or, depending on the tradition, Mañjuvajra, the tantric Mañjusri Buddha) at the center of the mandala instead of Vairocana.

The Mother Tantras (i.e. Yoginitantras), like the Cakrasaṃvara Tantra, adopt the basic idea of the five family mandalas, but are more different than the Father tantras in their structure and make use of different deities, including many more female ḍākinī deities. The Cakrasaṃvara for example, contains six main Buddhas with their own corresponding mandalas: Heruka, Vairocana, Vajrasūrya, Padmanarteśvara, Paramāśva, and Vajrasattva.

The Hevajratantra's mandala is even more ḍākinī centric, with a mandala focused on Hevajra surrounded by eight ḍākinīs, with no obvious connection to the standard five Buddha family schema. However, some later tantric commentators to the Hevajra tantra (like Abhayakaragupta) do indeed map these Hevajra deities to the five families. This shows that the five family schema remained an important one even in the later period of Buddhist tantra as the Yoginitantras were moving away from the standard schemas of the Yoga tantras.

== Elements of the Five Families ==
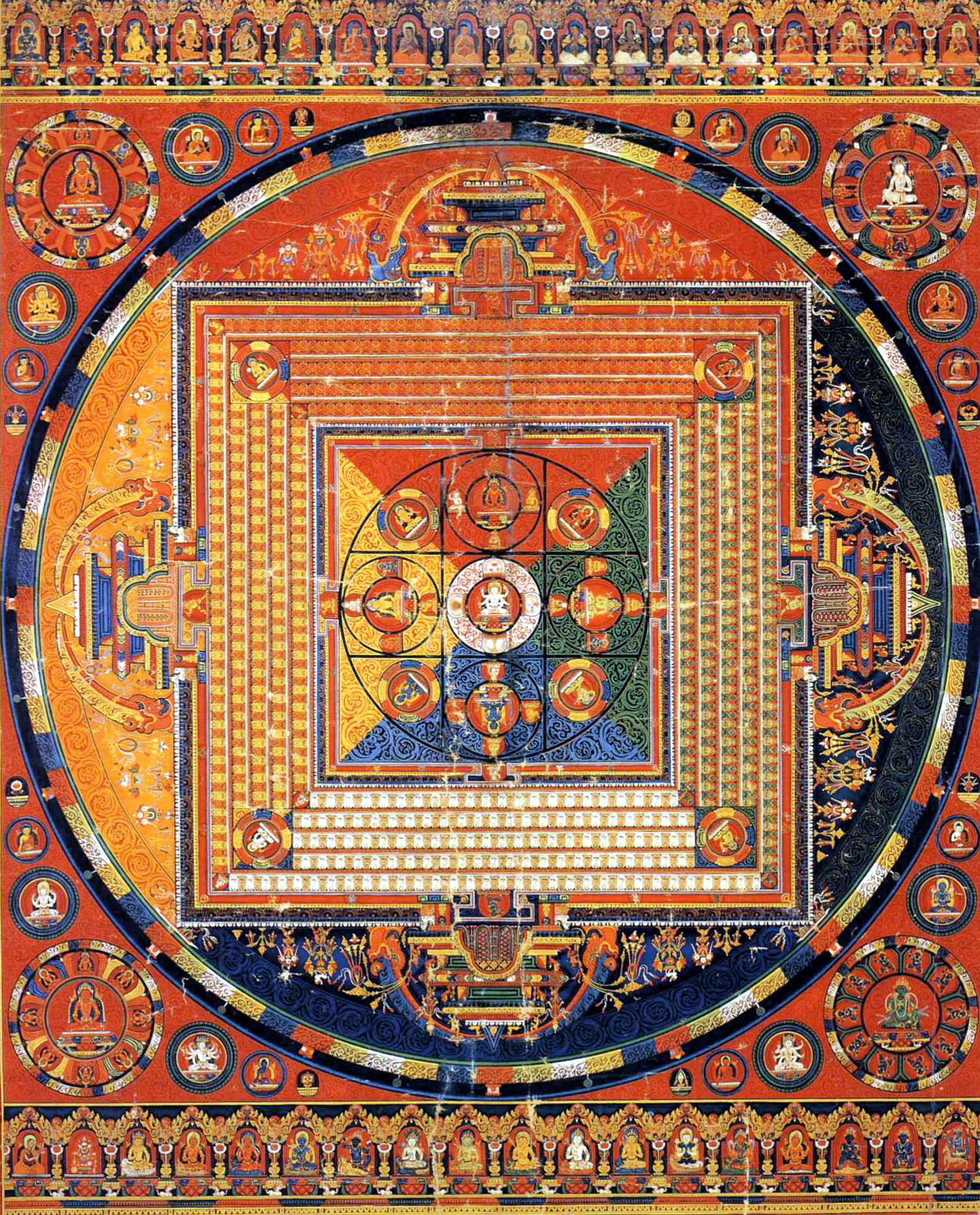
Tibetan Diamond Realm of the Vajradhatu mandala, 19th century

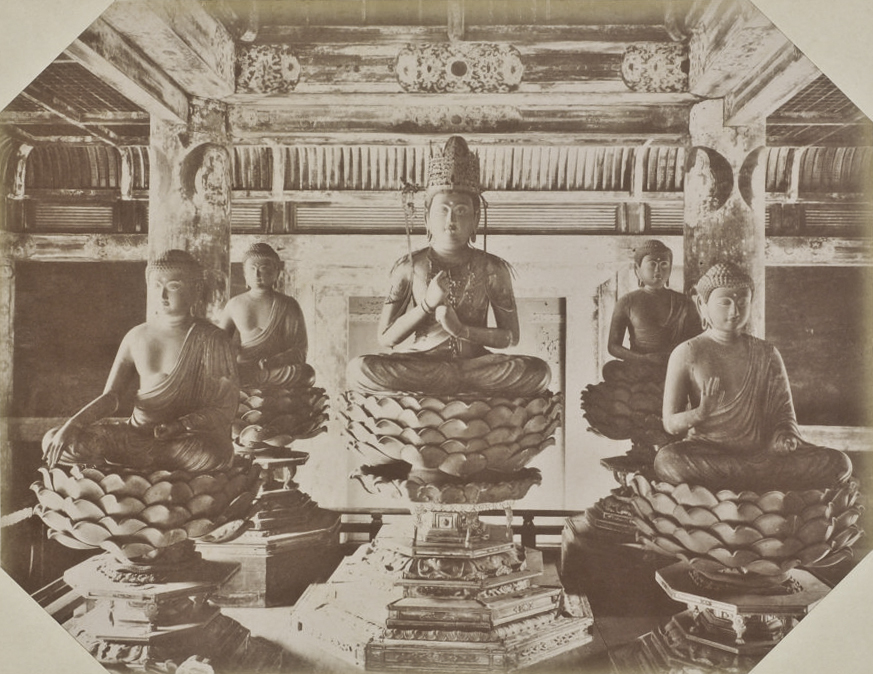
Statue mandala of the five Buddhas, Kongō Sanmai-in, Koyasan, Wakayama, Japan

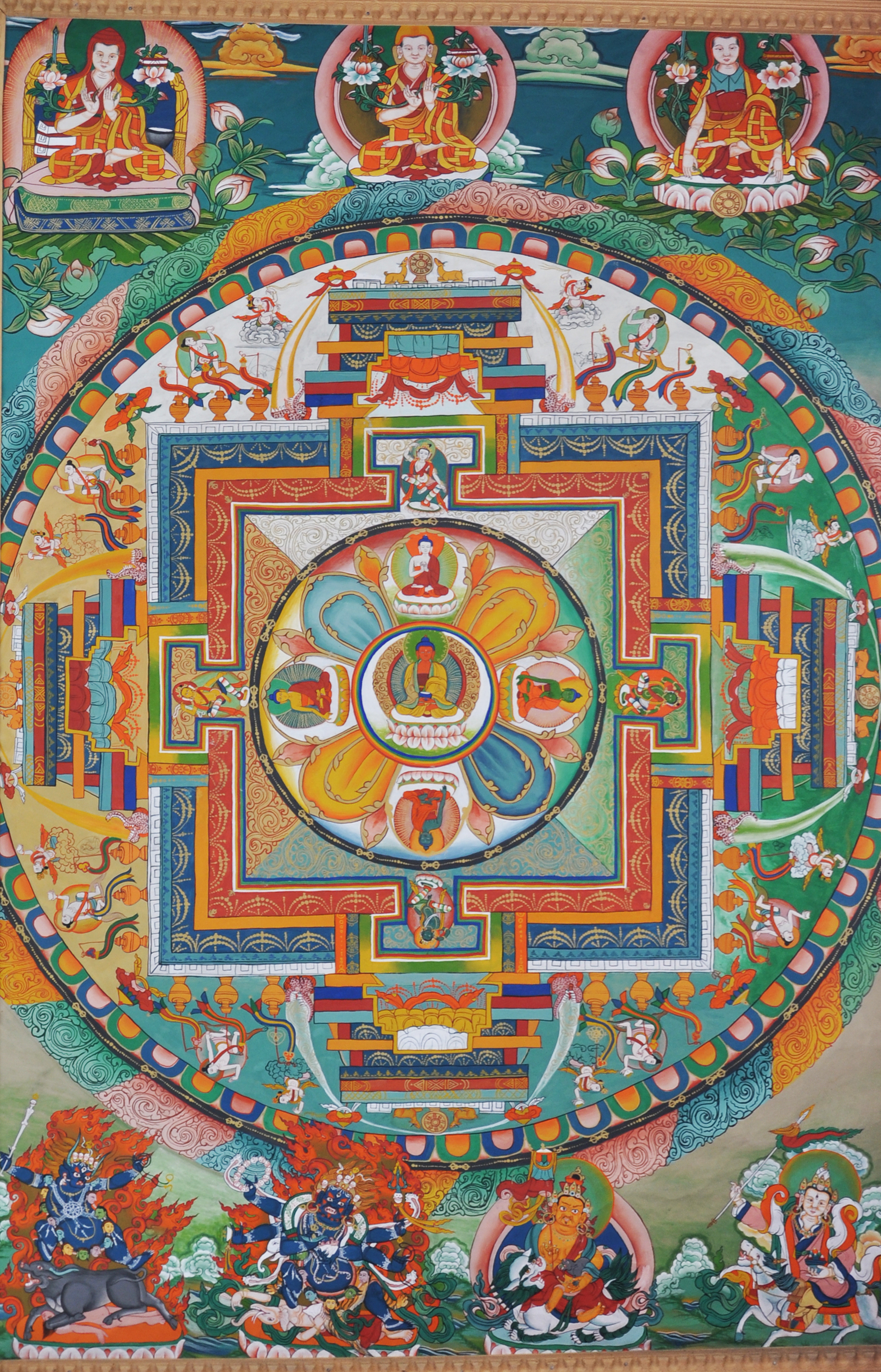
A Tibetan Mandala with Amitabha Buddha in the center, and the four cardinal male and female Buddhas.

In the tantric Buddhist literature, each of the five Buddhas have extensive qualities and features, including different directions, colors, mudrā, symbol, aspects, klesha, element; consort and spiritual son, as well as different animal vehicles (elephant, lion, peacock, harpies or garuda, or dragon).

The cardinal positions of Akshobhya and Vairocana can alter depending on specific teachings. In a classic schema, Vairocana may be seen as embodying sovereignty as the lord of the mandala and thus is at the central place of the mandala. Akshobhya then may face east as the second Buddha, and embodies steadfastness. He may be seated in the Vajraparyanka (also known as Bhūmisparśa) pose, with the right hand on the right knee, palm turned inwardly, and middle finger touching the ground. Amitābha embodies measureless light and faces west. A statue of Amitābha, when seated, has a samadhi mudrā with both palms face up, on top of each other, in his lap.

When these Five Buddhas are represented in mandalas of distinct Buddhist traditions, they may not always have the same colour or be related to the same direction. As mentioned, Akshobhya and Vairocana may be switched, as in the Guhyasamaja system which has Aksobhya in the center, and as in the Longchen Nyingtig tradition where Akshobhya is also in the center.

In other cases, different Buddhas may take the center place as well depending on the teaching cycle or tantra which is being depicted.

When represented in a Vairocana mandala of the Vajradhatu, the Buddhas are arranged as follows:

	Amoghasiddhi (North)
Amitābha (West)	Vairocana (Center)	Akshobhya (East)
	Ratnasambhava (South)

=== Main aspects of the Five Families ===
There is an expansive number of associations with each element of the Five Buddhas mandala, so that the mandala becomes a cipher and mnemonic visual thinking instrument and concept map; a vehicle for understanding and decoding the whole of the Dharma.

In numerous Vajrayana sources, each Buddha Family or Division has numerous symbols, secondary figures including bodhisattvas, protectors, etc., abilities, and aspects.

Some of the main esoteric associations of each family include:

Family (Skt, Kula)	Buddha	Colour and Element	Skandha Aggretate	Klesha	Mudra	Throne	Bīja Syllable	jñana Wisdom
Buddha Family	Vairocana	White, Space	Form (or Consciousness)	Aversion (or Ignorance, ávidyā)	Teaching Mudra (Dharma Chakra Pravartan Mudra)	Lion throne	Om	suviśuddhadharmadhātujñāna Perfectly Pure Dharma sphere Jñana
Vajra Family	Akṣobhya	Blue, Water	Consciousness (or Form) (rupa)	Ignorance (or Aversion)	Earth-touching Mudra (Bhumisparsha Mudra)	Elephant throne	Hum	ādarśajñāna Mirror-like Jñana
Ratna (Jewel) Family	Ratnasambhava	Yellow, Earth	Feeling (vedana)	Pride (or Greed)	Giving Mudra (Varada Mudra)	Horse throne	Tram	samatājñāna Sameness Jñana
Padma (Lotus) Family	Amitābha	Red, Fire	Perception (saṃjñā)	Craving	Meditation Mudra (Dhyana Mudra)	Peacock throne	Hrih	pratyavekṣaṇājñāna Discriminating Jñana
Karma Family	Amoghasiddhi	Green, Wind	Volition (samkhara)	Envy	Fearlessness Mudra (Abhaya Mudra)	Garuda throne	Ah	kṛtyānuṣṭhānajñāna Perfect practice Jñana

=== Five female Buddhas and the families ===
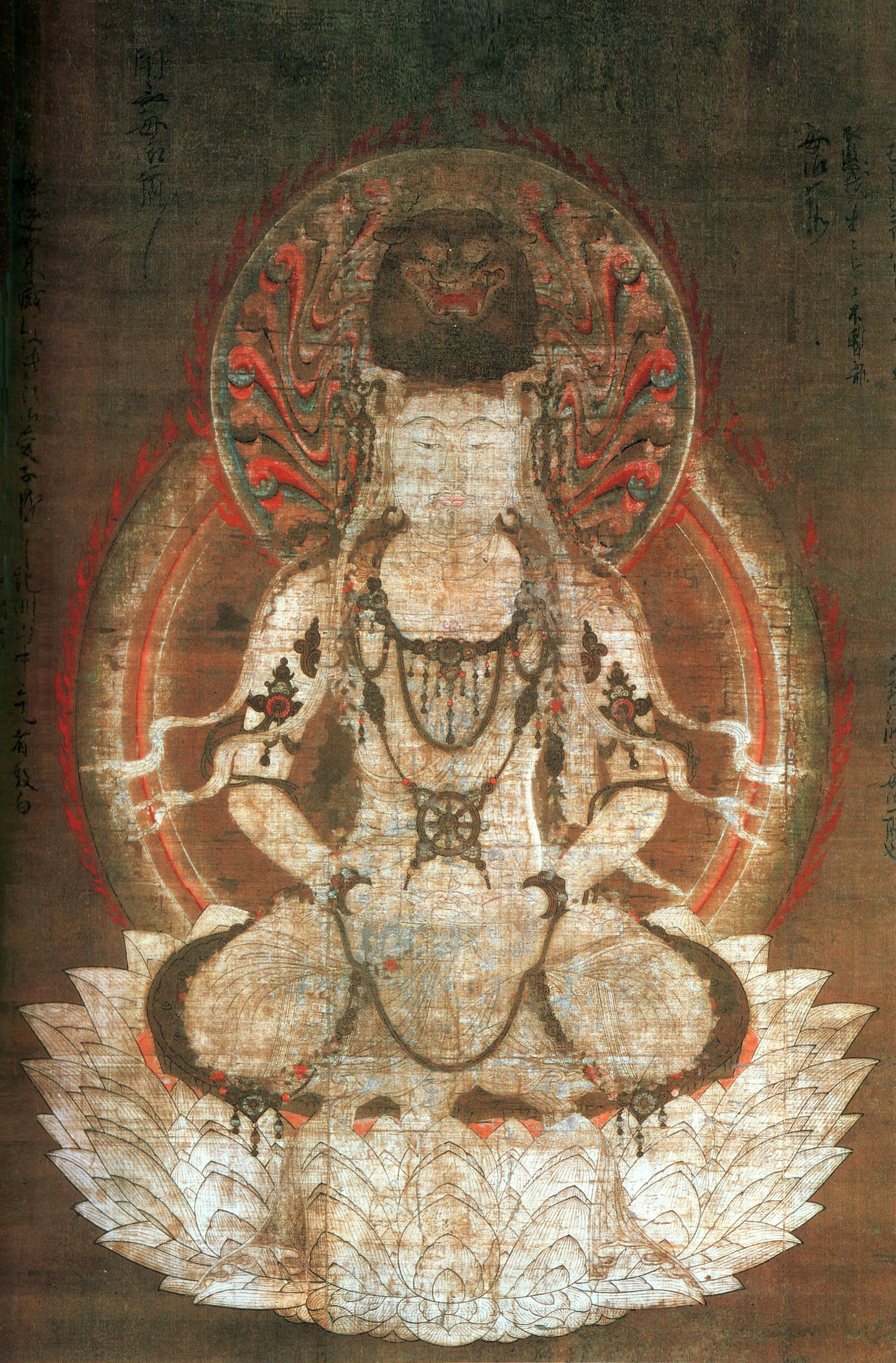
A Japanese painting of the female Buddha or vidyarajni (wisdom queen) Buddhalocanā (Buddha's Eye, Jp. 仏眼仏母 Butsugen butsumo, Buddha mother), the consort of Mahavairocana Buddha in Japanese esotericism.

Each male Buddha is paired with a female Buddha, often called mothers, prajña, vidya, or consort. Together, each family also presides over their own pure land or buddhafield. Although all five families abide in pure lands, it appears that only Sukhavati of Amitābha, and to a much lesser extent Abhirati of Akshobhya, where great masters like Vimalakirti and Milarepa are said to dwell, were popularly venerated. Some temples include all five Buddhas in their mandalas and statuary.

The Five Tathāgathas are protected by five Wisdom Kings called Vidyārājas, and in China and Japan they are frequently depicted together in the Mandala of the Two Realms. In the Shurangama Mantra revealed in the Śūraṅgama Sūtra, an especially influential dharani in the Chinese Chan tradition, the Five Tathāgathas are mentioned as the hosts of the five divisions which control the vast armies of the five directions.

In one common Five Families schema of Indian Yoga Tantra, the five prajña consorts or five mothers (Tib. ཡུམ་ལྔ་, Wyl. yum lnga), the associated bodhisattvas and their pure lands that correspond to the Five Tathagatas are:

Buddha (Skt)	Wisdom Consort (prajña)	Consort Mantra	Bodhisattva	Vidyārāja protector	Pure land and direction
Vairocana	Ākāśadhātvīśvarī, also known as Vajradhātvisharī, Buddhaḍākinī or Sparśavajrī	oṃ sarva buddha jñāna aṃ svāhā	Vajraparamita or Vajrasattva	Acala	Akaniṣṭha-Ghanavyūha (Center)
Akṣobhya	Locanā, also known as Buddhalocanā, Tathāgatalocanā	According to Mañjuśrīmūlakalpa: Oṁ buddhalocane svāhā	Vajrapani or Samantabhadra	Trailokyavijaya	Abhirati (East)
Amitābha	Paṇḍāravāsinī, also known as Sitavāsinī	According to Mañjuśrīmūlakalpa: Oṁ kaṭe vikaṭe nikaṭe kaṭaṅkaṭe kaṭavikaṭakaṭaṅkaṭe svāhā	Avalokiteśvara	Yamāntaka	Sukhāvatī (West)
Ratnasaṃbhava	Māmakī	According to Mañjuśrīmūlakalpa: oṁ kulandhari bandha bandha huṁ phaṭ.	Mañjusri, Ratnapani	Kuṇḍali	Śrīmat (South)
Amoghasiddhi	Tara, Samayatārā	Various Tara mantras, the most widespread being: Oṃ tāre tuttāre ture svāhā	Maitreya, or Viśvapāni	Vajrayakṣa	Karmaprasiddhi or Prakuṭā (North)

Other tantras and commentaries provide alternative families and listings of the male and female Buddha pairings. In some systems, like the Guhyasamāja Tantra, Akṣobhya appears at the center of the mandala, with Sparśavajrī as consort.

In Japanese Esoteric Buddhism meanwhile, Buddhalocanā (Buddha's Eye, Jp. Butsugen butsumo) is the consort of Mahavairocana and is considered the mother of Buddhas. She is also associated with Prajñaparamita.

Sometimes Tara may appear as associated with the Lotus family, since one tradition states that she was born of Avalokitesvara.

Each female Buddha also has their own mantra, for example Pāṇḍaravāsinī's mantra in the Mañjuśrīmūlakalpa (ch 37) is:

Oṁ kaṭe vikaṭe nikaṭe kaṭaṅkaṭe kaṭavikaṭakaṭaṅkaṭe svāhā

Buddhalocanā's mantra in the Mañjuśrīmūlakalpa (found in chapter 37) is:

oṁ ru ru sphuru jvala tiṣṭha siddhalocane sarvārthasādhani svāhā

According to the Guhyasamājatantra, each Buddha family is also assigned a specific mantra:

- Vairocana - Buddha family mantra: jinajik
- Akṣobhya - Vajra family mantra: vajradhr̥k
- Ratnasambhava - Ratna family mantra: ratnadhr̥k
- Amitābha - Lotus family mantra: ārolik
- Amoghasiddhi - Karma family mantra: prajñādhr̥k

=== The "Sixth" Buddha, the dharma-body ===
The Five Buddhas may also be seen as aspects of the Dharmakāya or "dharma-body", which reflect all apparent phenomena. The Vajrasekhara Sutra also mentions a sixth Buddha, Vajradhara, "a Buddha (or principle) seen as the source, in some sense, of the five Buddhas." This idea later developed into a tantric idea of the Adi-Buddha, which generally came to be seen as the ground of all the Five Buddhas, as the Dharmakāya itself, the ultimate reality which spontaneously manifests the Five Buddha families. Different Buddhist traditions understand and name their highest Buddha in various ways. In the Nyingma school, the highest Buddhas are known as Samantabhadra and Samantabhadri. In Shingon Buddhism, it is Mahavairocana. In Japanese Pure Land Buddhism, they understand all Buddhas as manifestations of Amitābha.

== Gallery ==
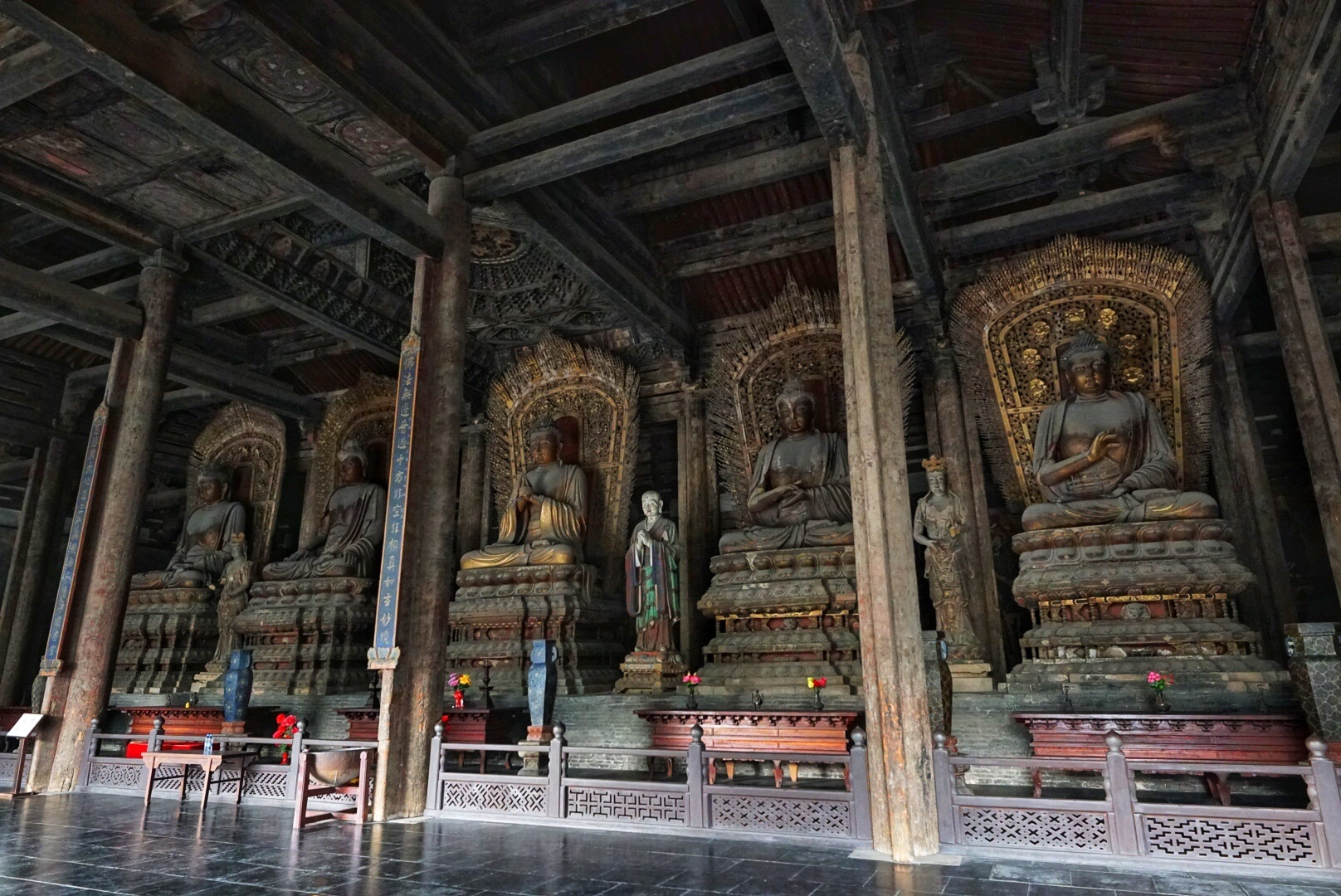
Jin Dynasty (1115–1234) statues of the Five Tathagathas (五方佛), in Shanhua Temple (善化寺) in Datong, Shanxi, China

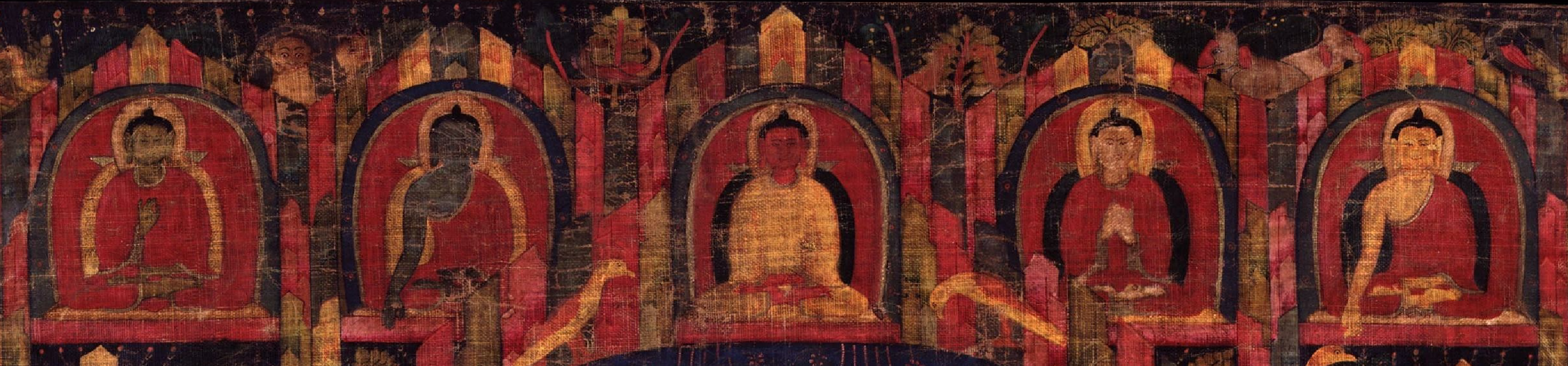
Ancient painting of Pancha Maha Thathagatas, Amoghasiddhi (green), Akshobhya (blue), Amitabha (red), Vairocana (white), Ratnasambhava (yellow) (date 1100–1200) in Nepal.

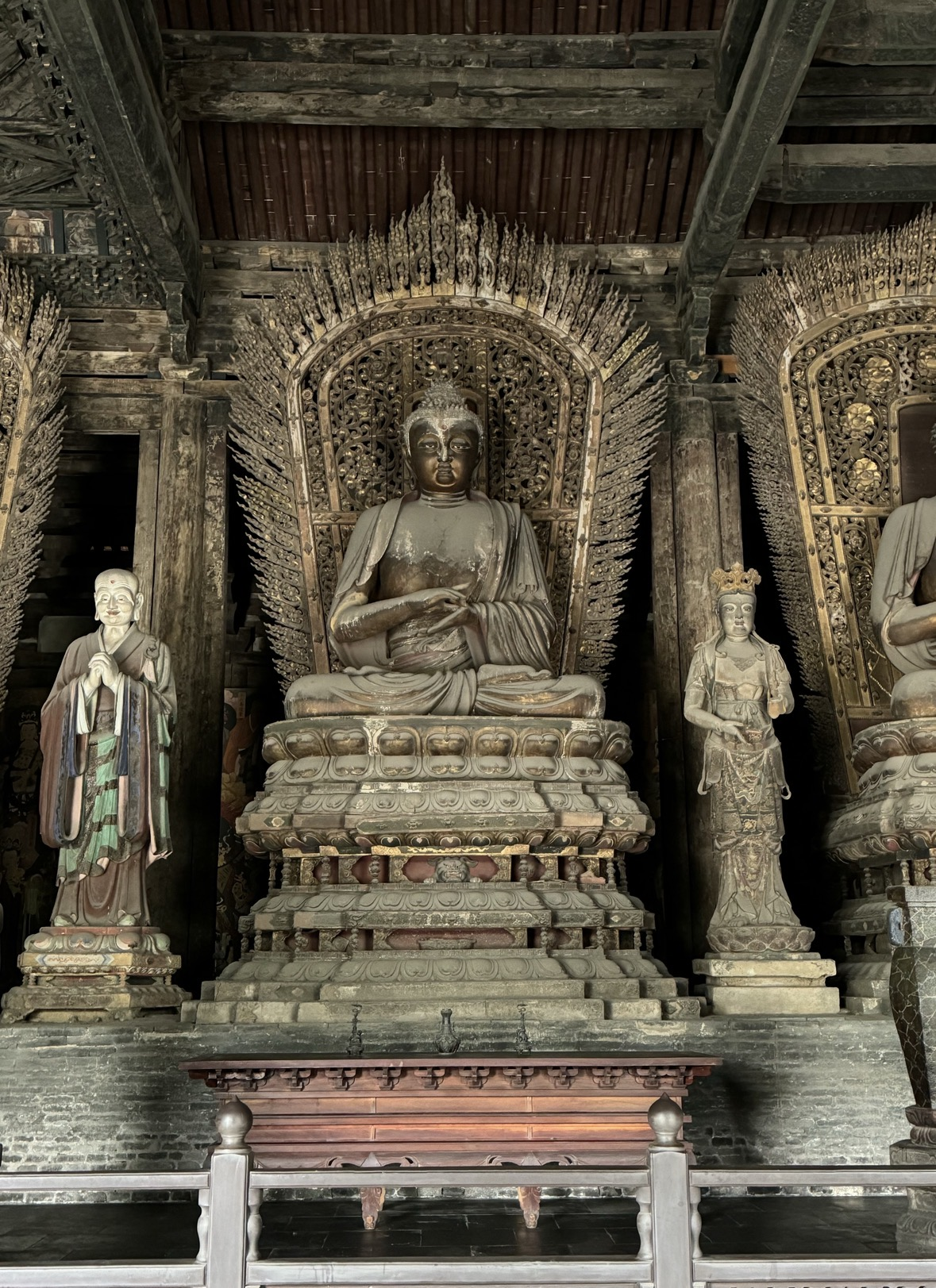
Jin Dynasty (1115–1234) statue of Ratnasambhava in Shanhua Temple in Datong, Shanxi, China

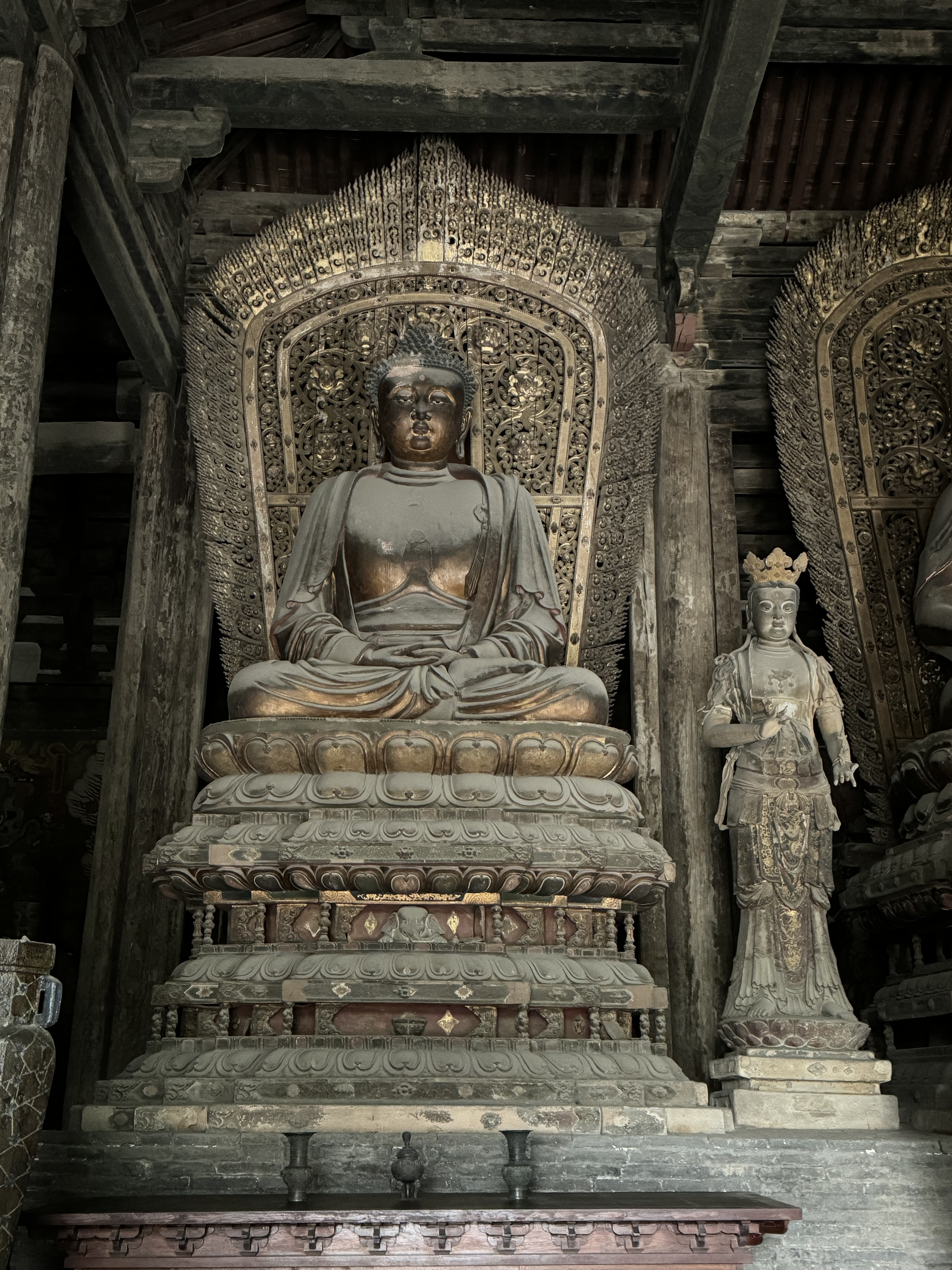
Jin Dynasty (1115–1234) statue of Amitabha in Shanhua Temple in Datong, Shanxi, China

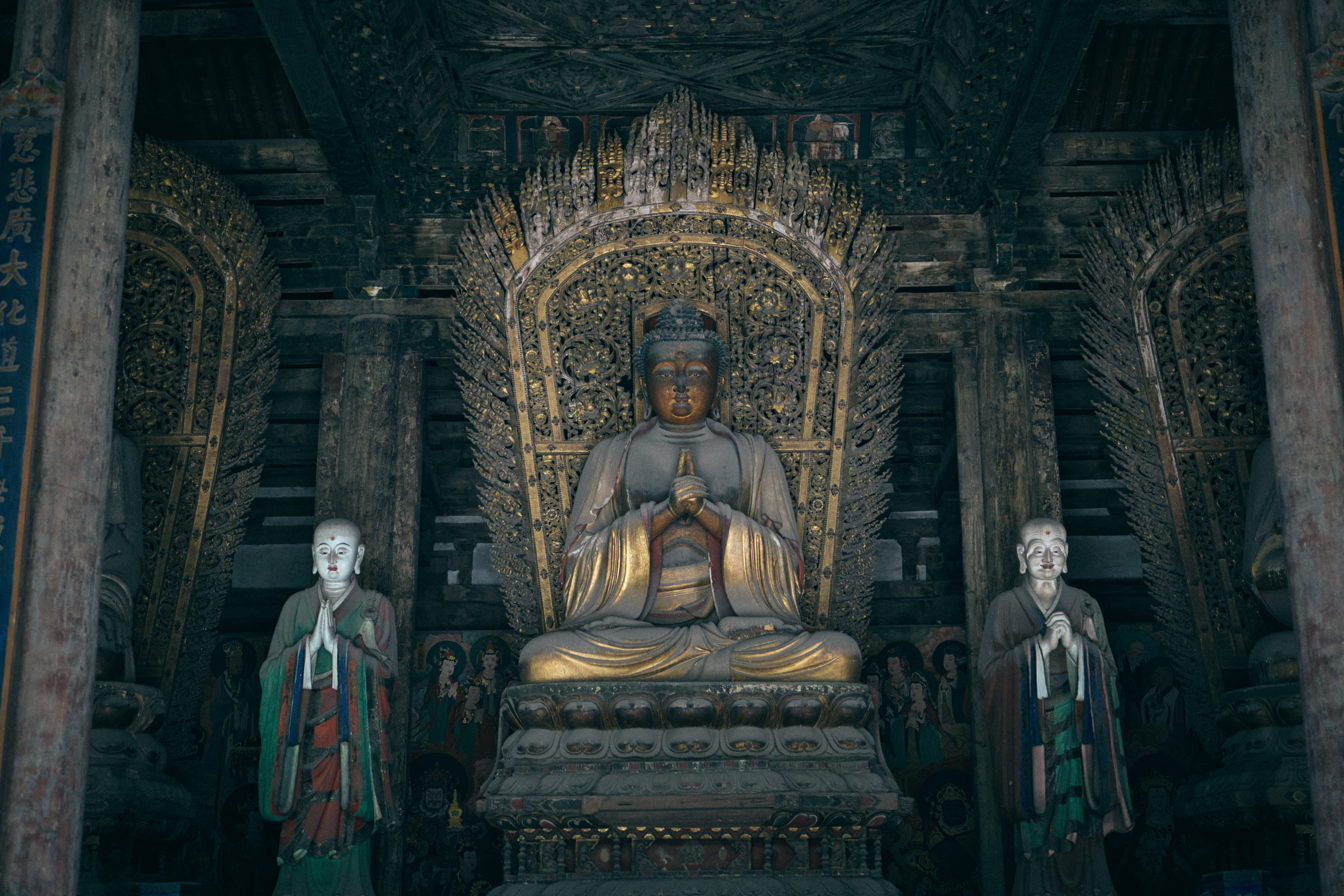
Jin Dynasty (1115–1234) statue of Vairocana in Shanhua Temple in Datong, Shanxi, China

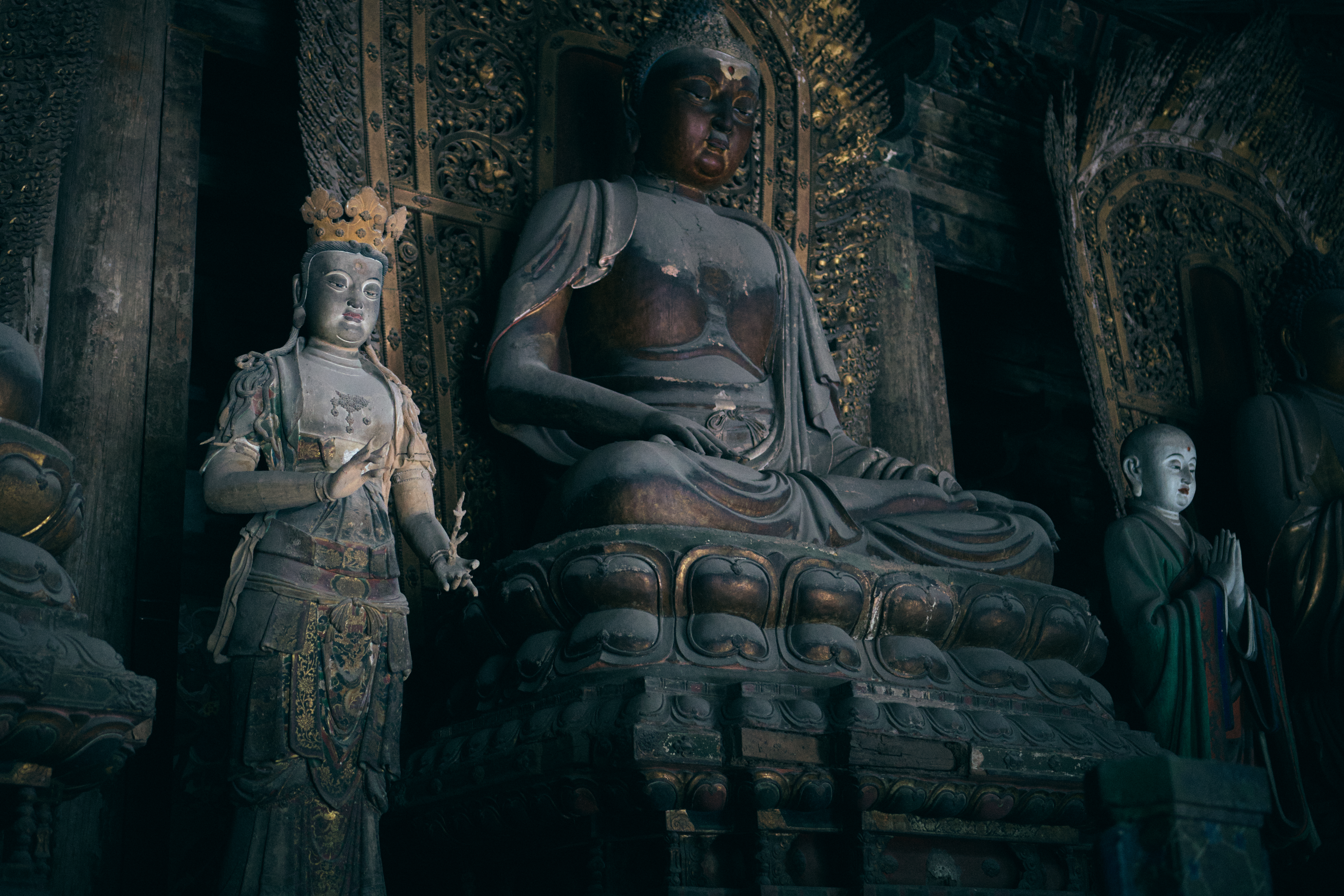
Jin Dynasty (1115–1234) statue of Akshobhya in Shanhua Temple in Datong, Shanxi, China

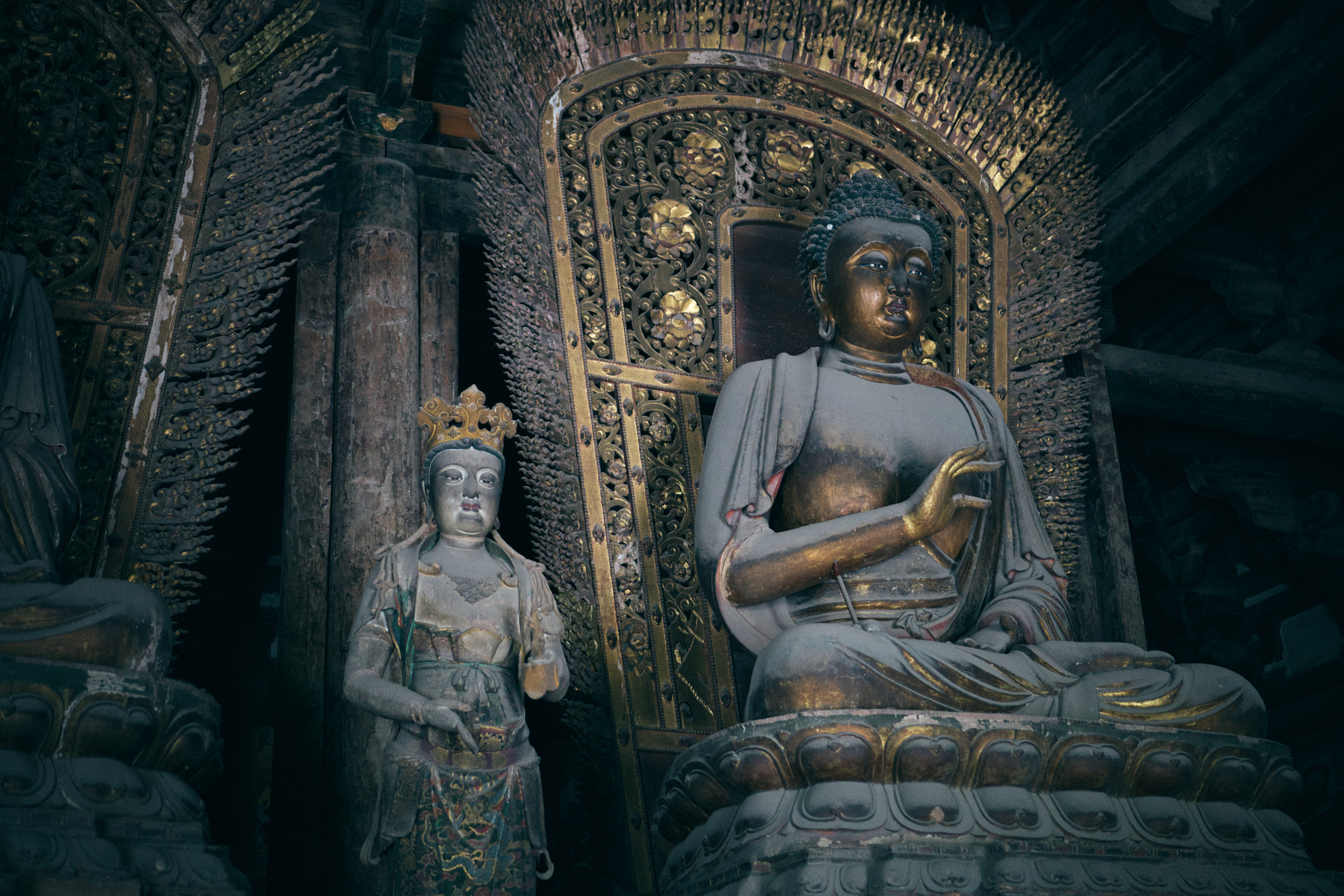
Jin Dynasty (1115–1234) statue of Amoghasiddhi in Shanhua Temple in Datong, Shanxi, China

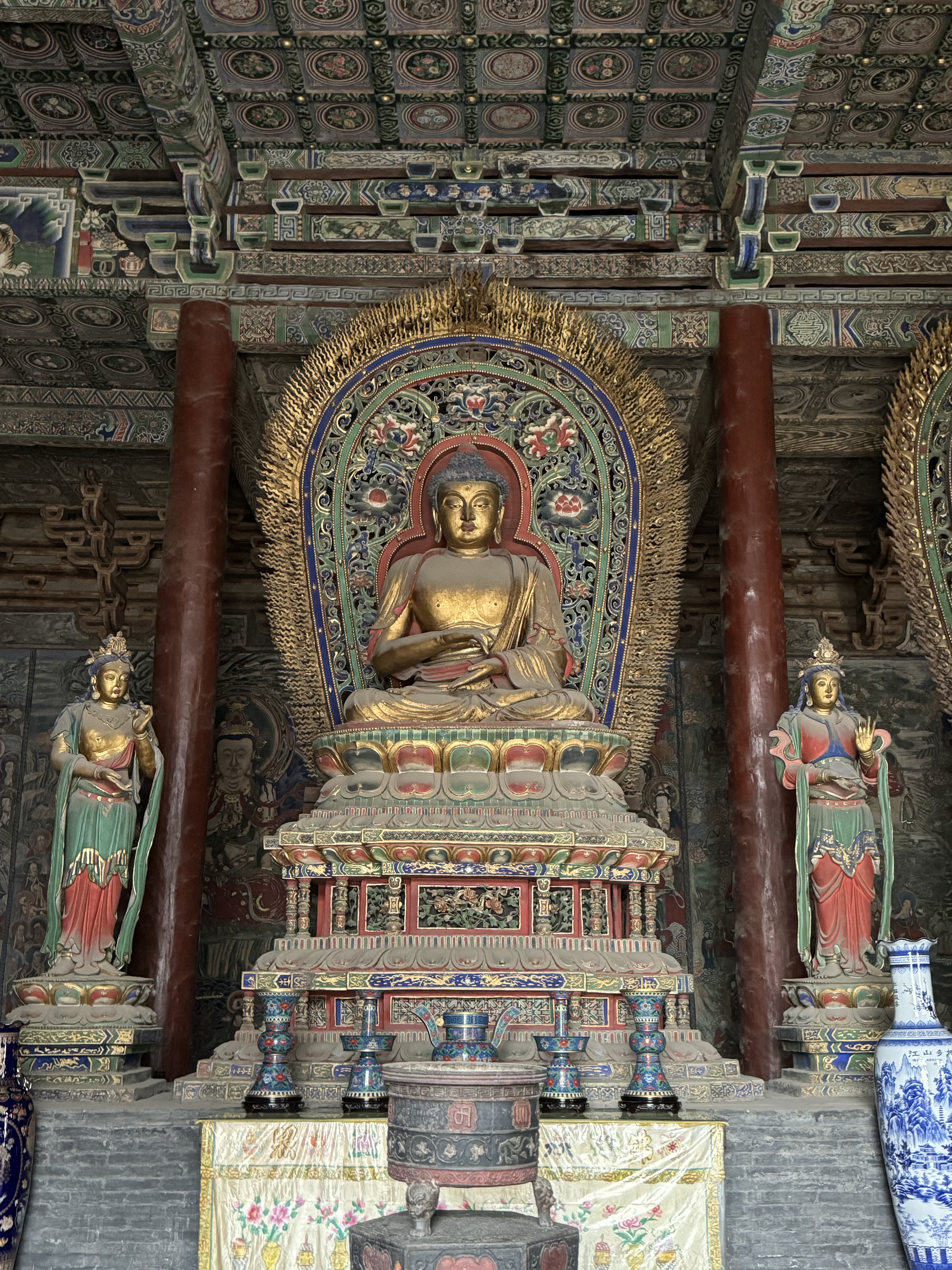
Ming dynasty (1368-1644) statue of Ratnasambhava in Huayan Temple in Datong, Shanxi, China

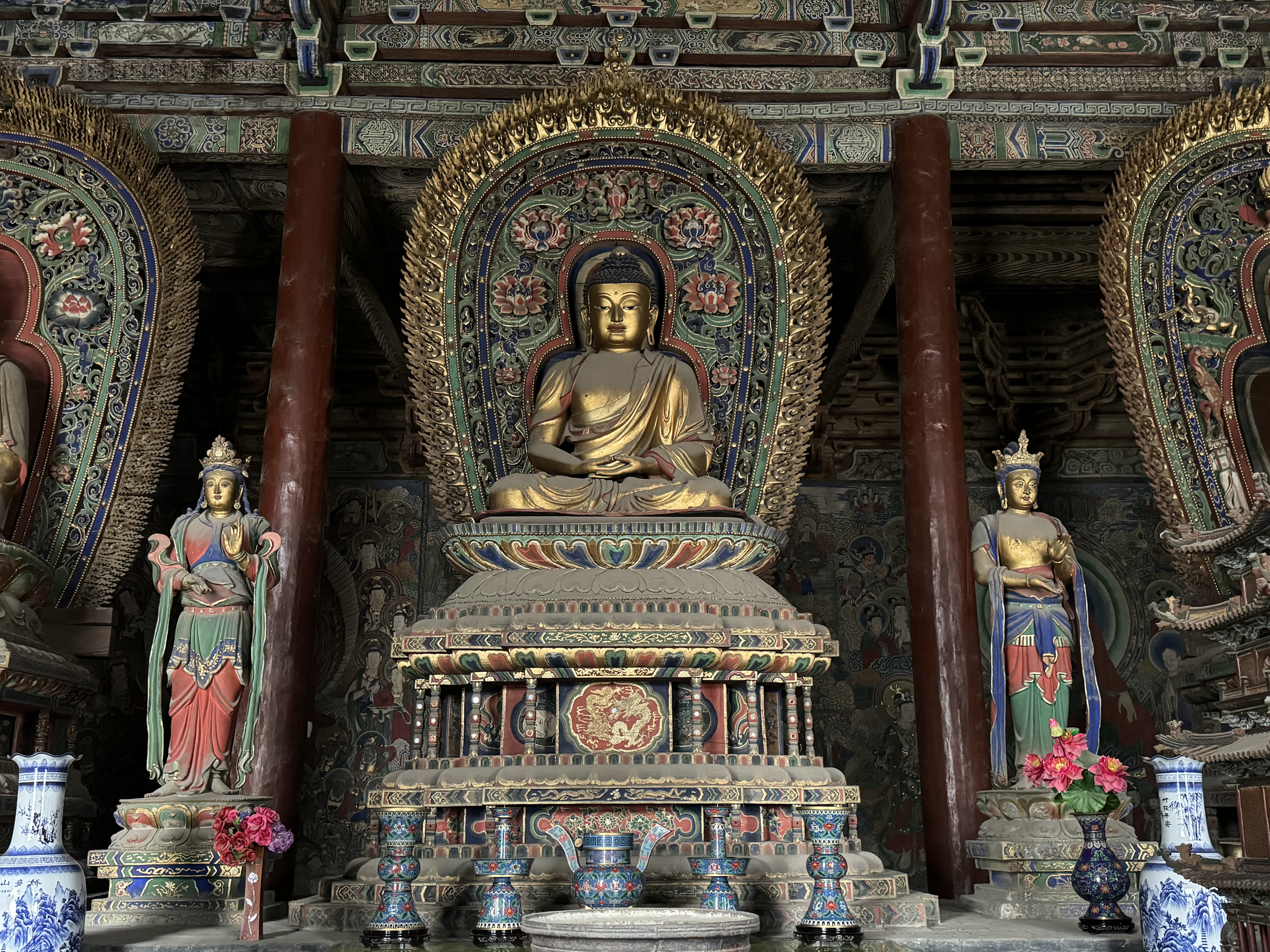
Ming dynasty (1368-1644) statue of Amitabha in Huayan Temple in Datong, Shanxi, China

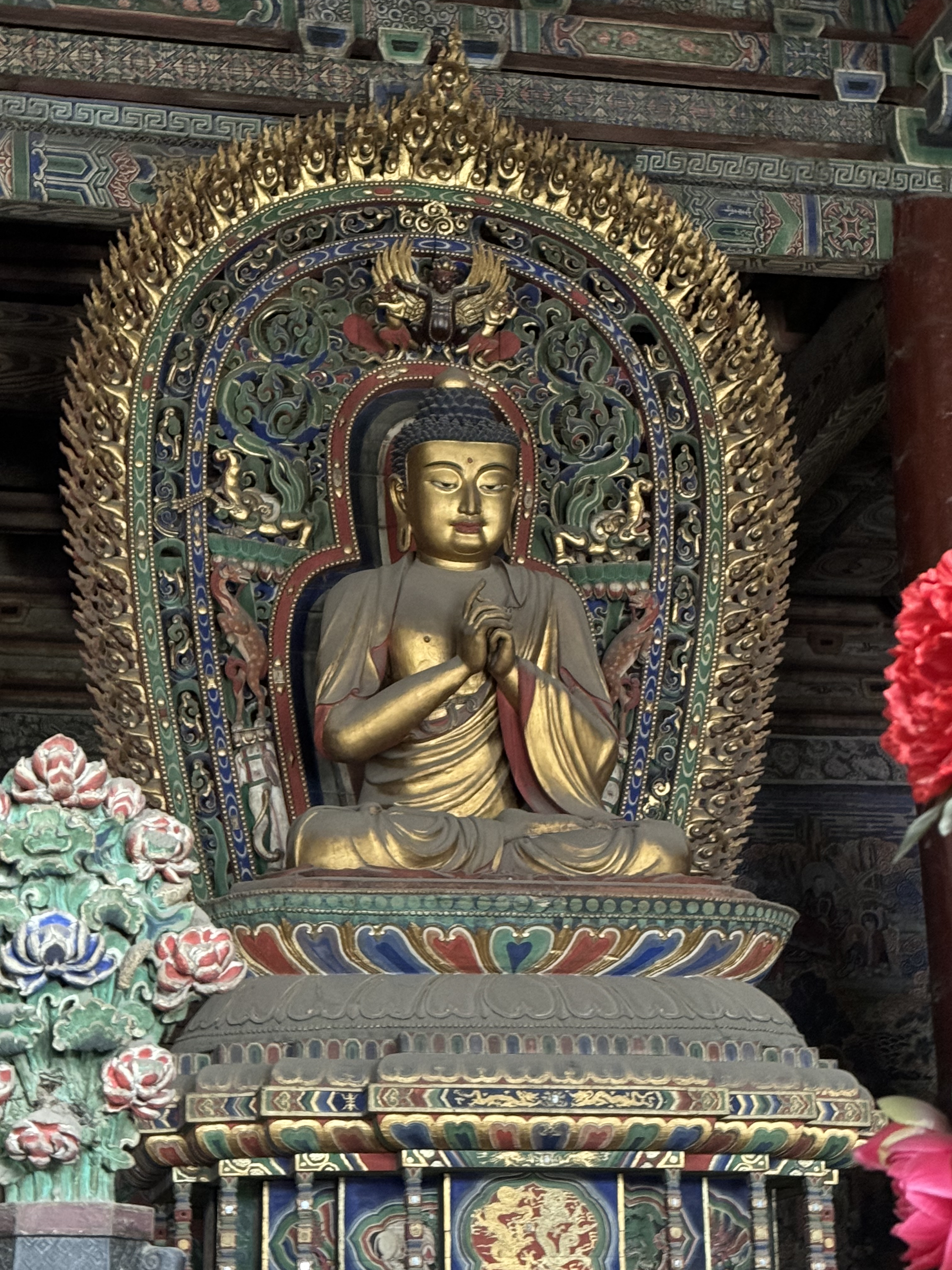
Ming dynasty (1368-1644) statue of Vairocana in Huayan Temple in Datong, Shanxi, China

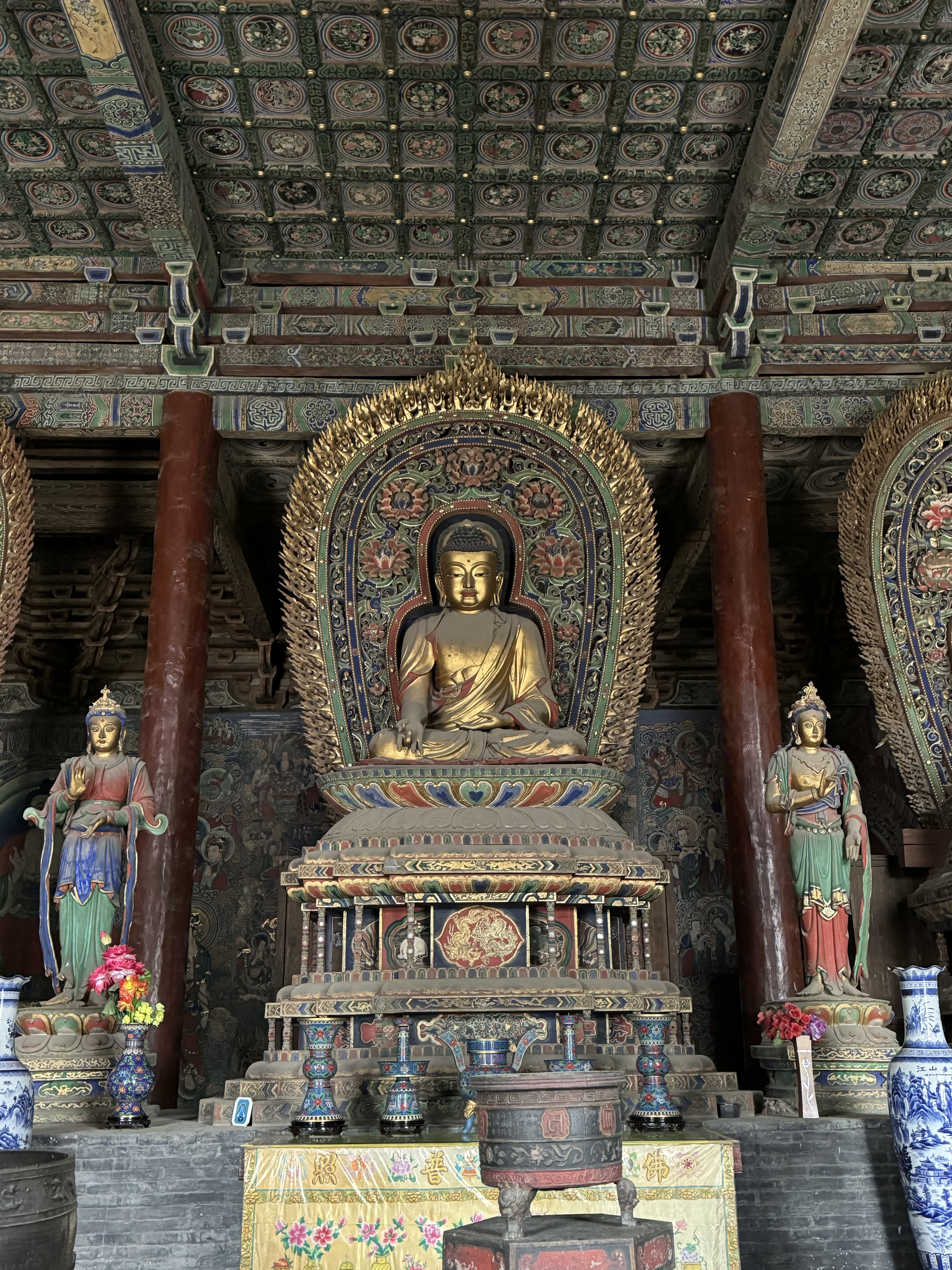
Ming dynasty (1368-1644) statue of Akshobhya in Huayan Temple in Datong, Shanxi, China

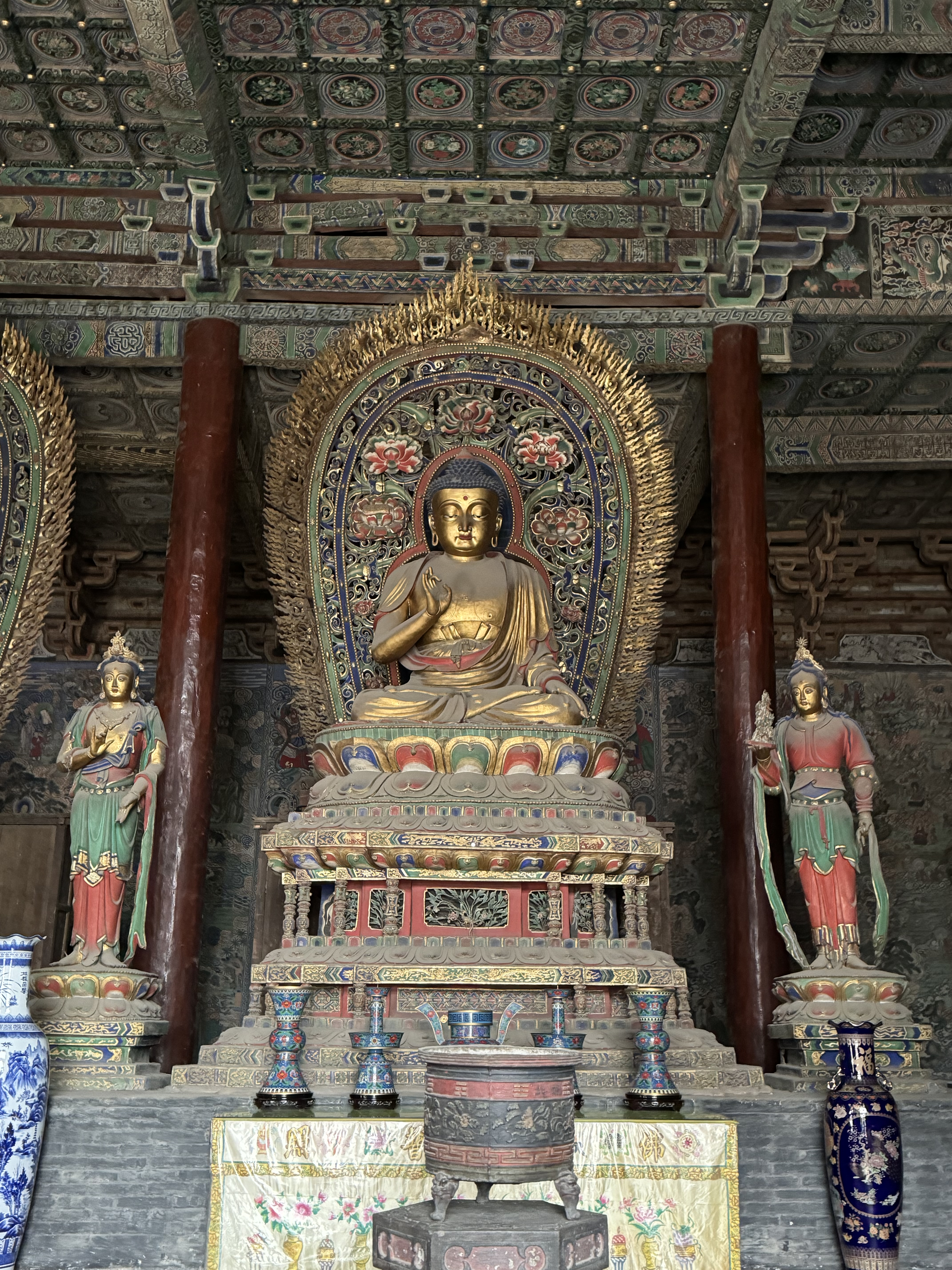
Ming dynasty (1368-1644) statue of Amoghasiddhi in Huayan Temple in Datong, Shanxi, China

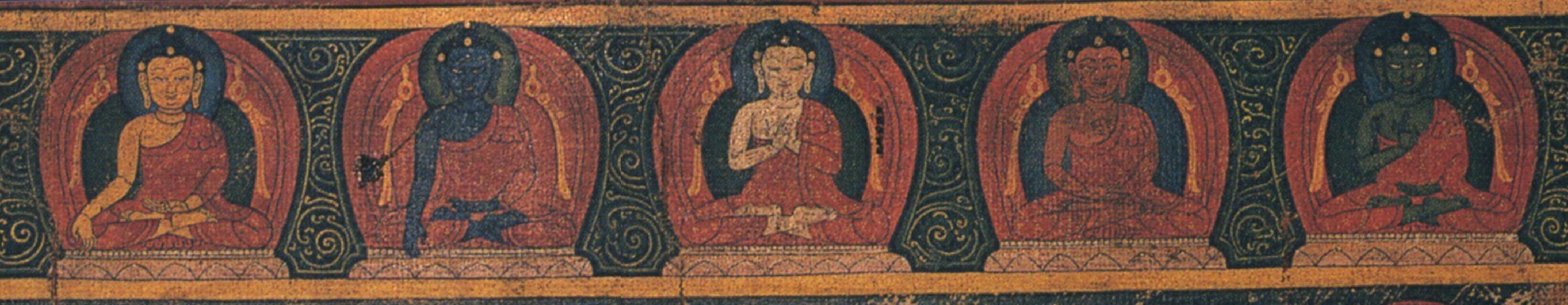
Five Thathagatas painting (Date 1400-1500), Ratnasambhava, Akshobhya, Vairocana, Amitabha, Amoghasiddhi / Himalayan art resources foundation in Nepal

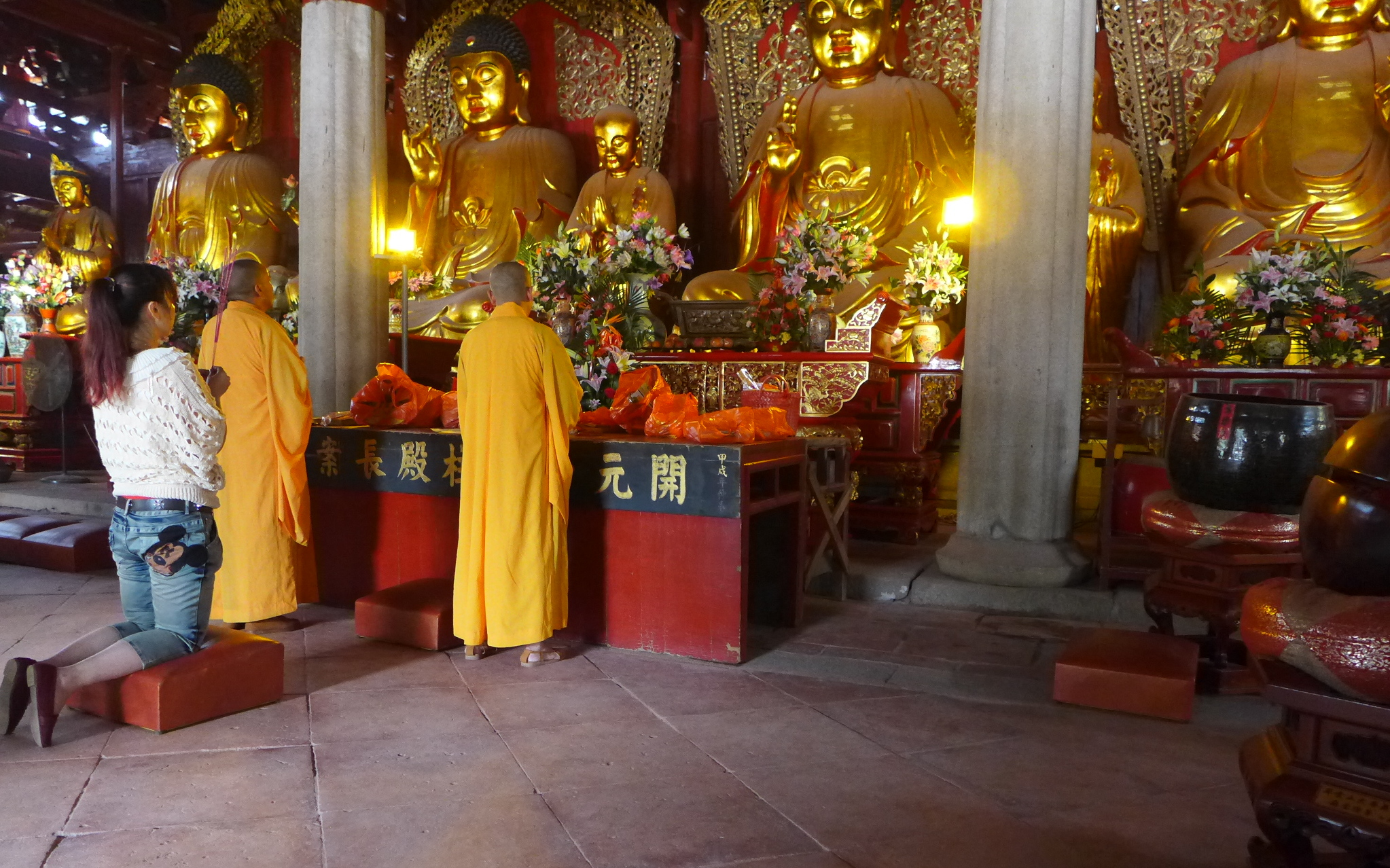
Monks and a lay follower in front of statues of the Five Tathagathas at the Mahavira Hall of Kaiyuan Temple in Quanzhou, Fujian, China

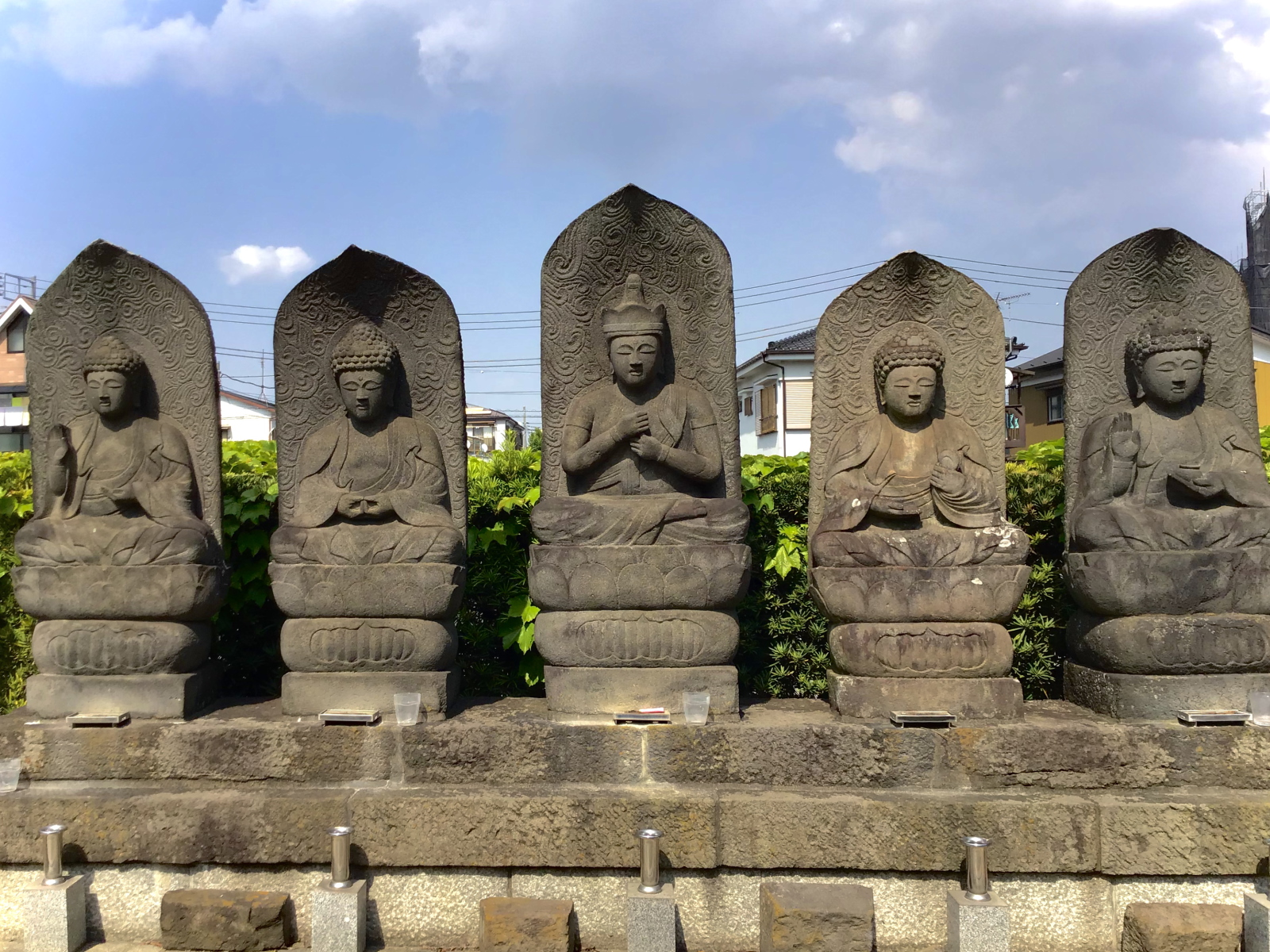
Five Tathagatas in Shinshoin Temple (Shibamata, Katsushika, Tokyo) . From the right side, Akshobhya, Ratnasambhava, Vairocana, Amitābha, and Amoghasiddhi

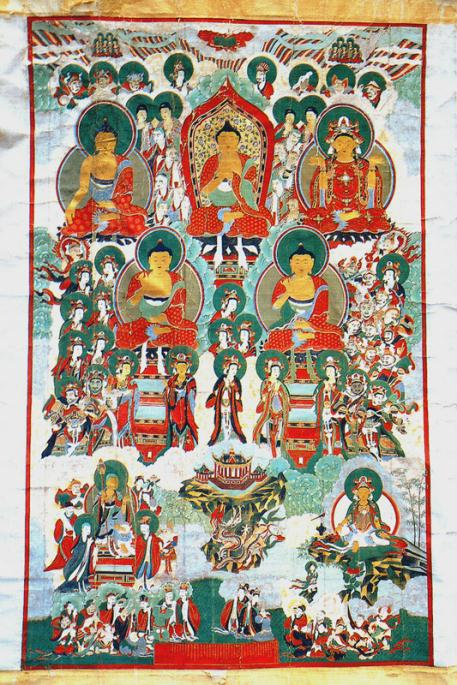
Painting of the Five Buddhas, circa the 6th year under Injo of Joseon Dynasty (1628), Korea

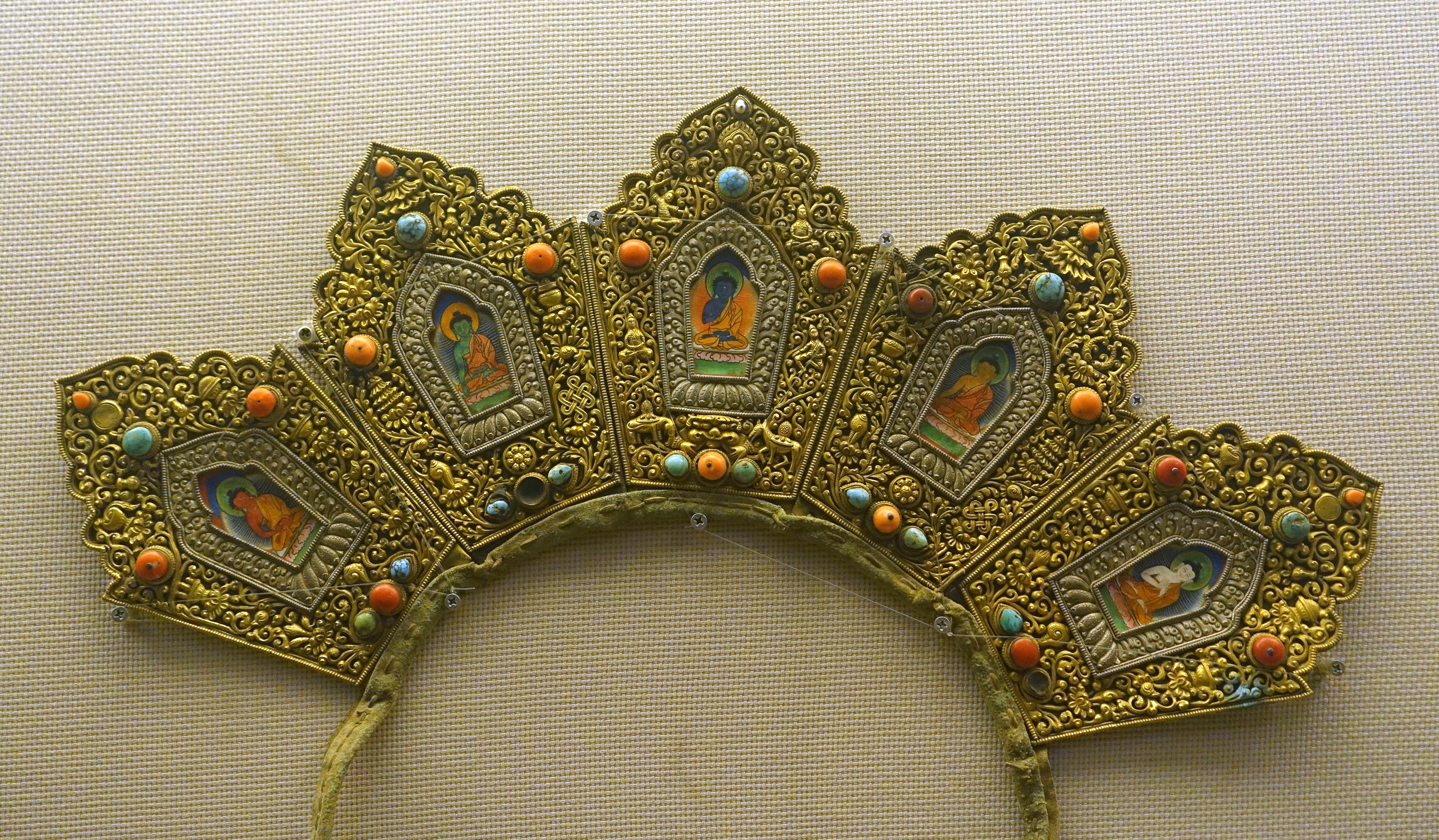
Gilt copper crown with five buddhas, Tibet, 1644-1911 CE.

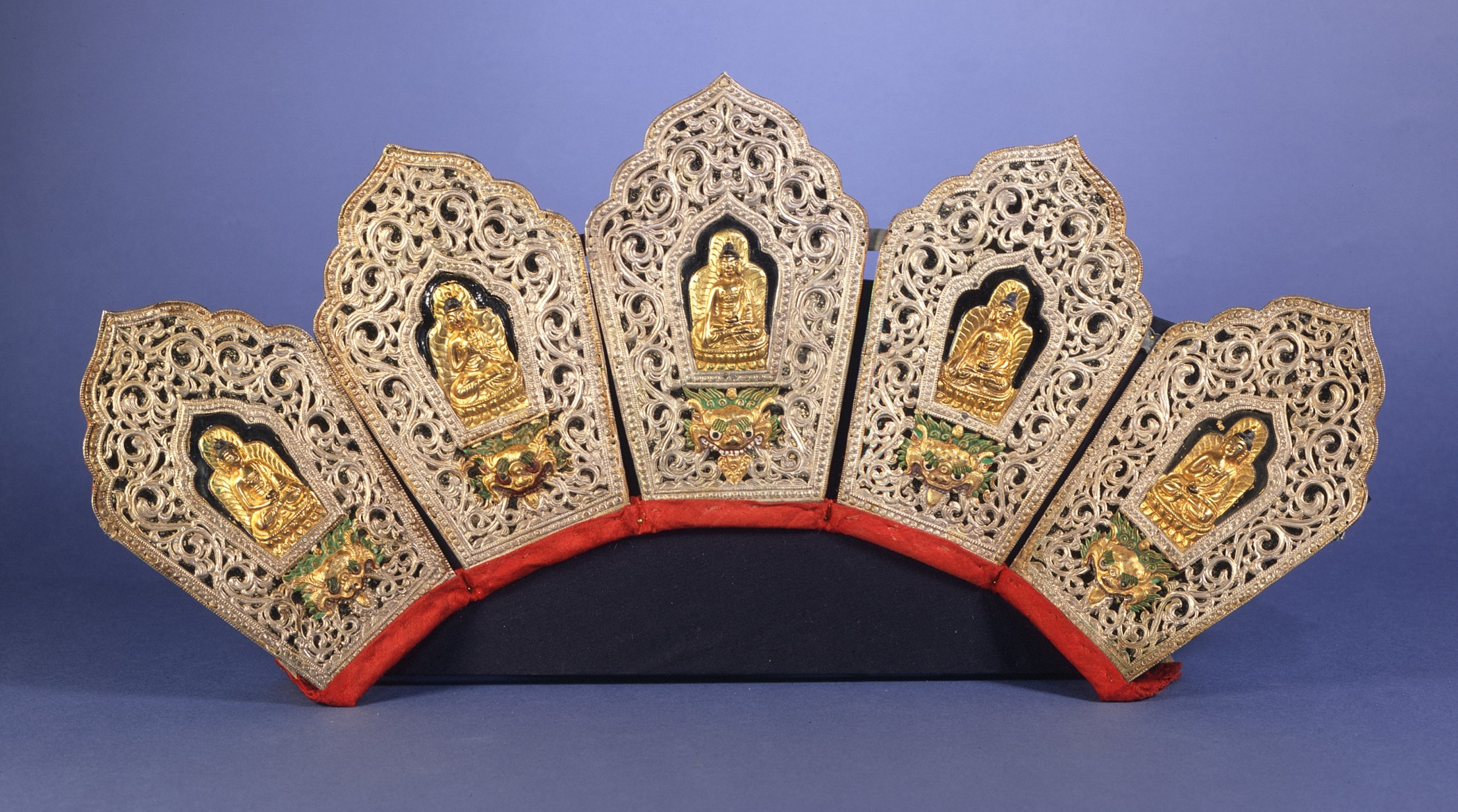
Ritual Diadem with the Five Jina Buddhas, Northern Nepal or Tibet, 19th century

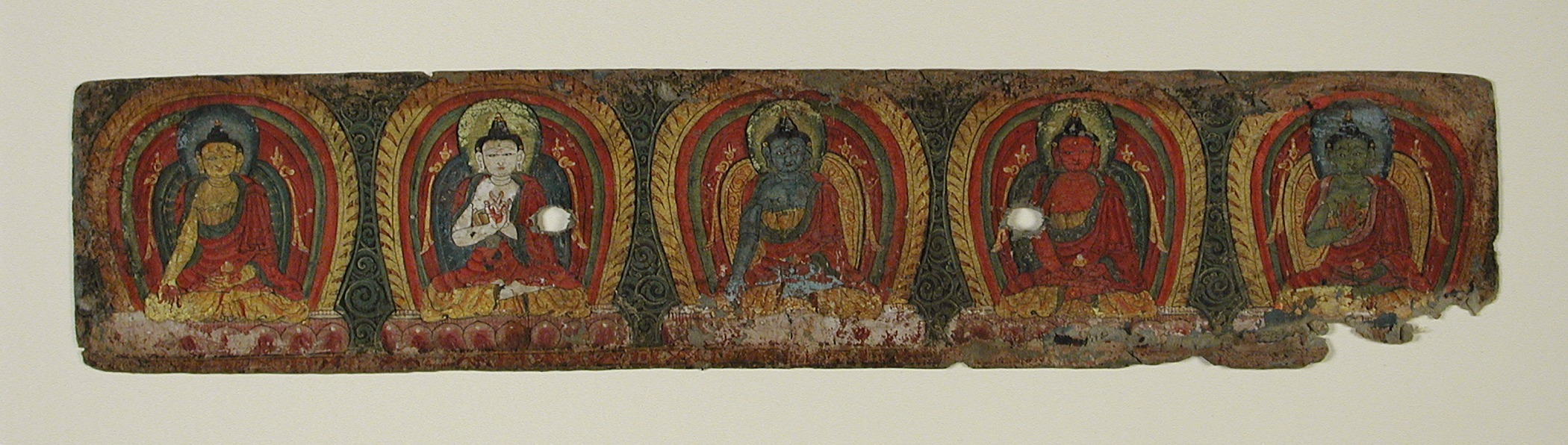
Five Buddhas, Nepal, 16th century

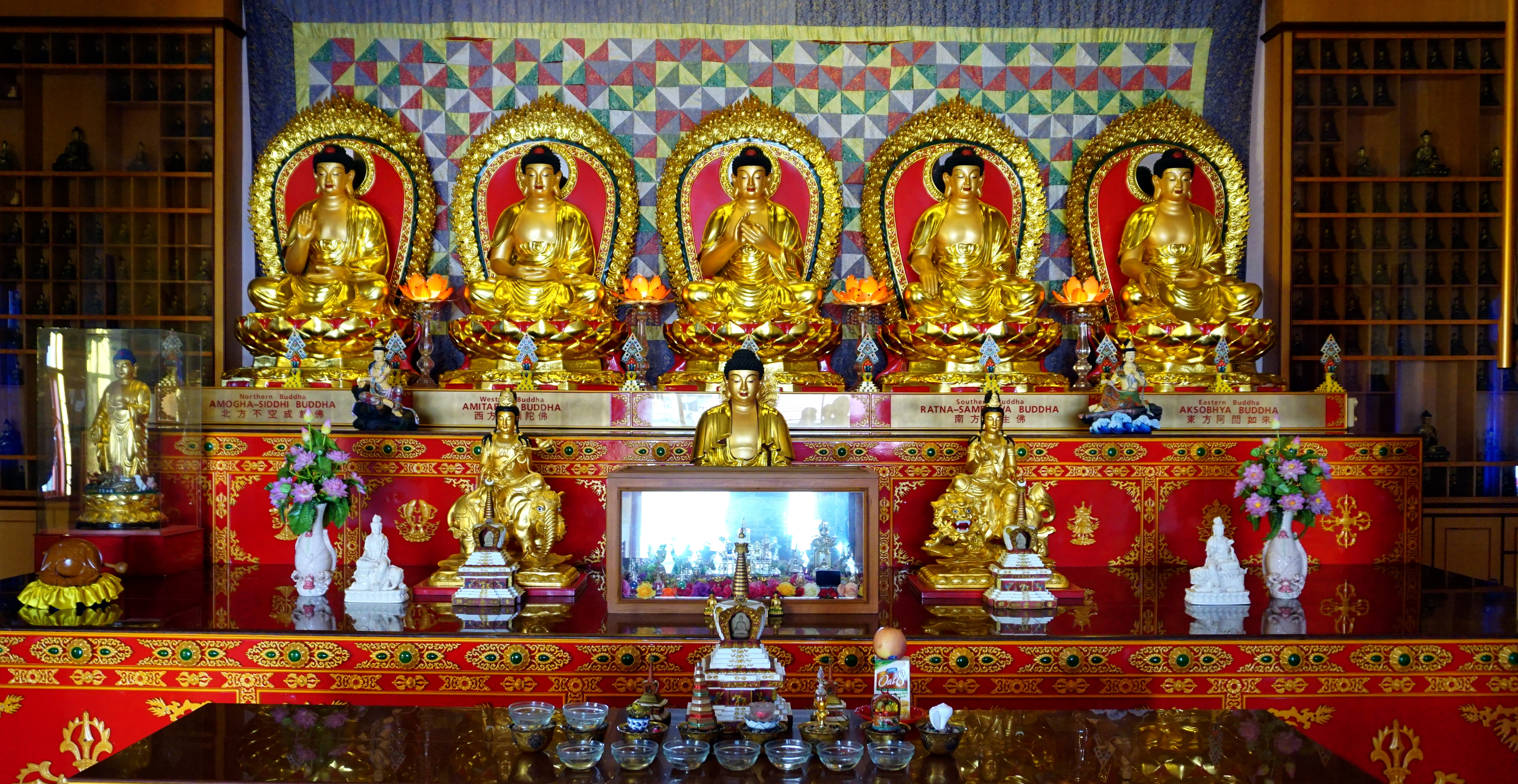
Statues of the Five Tathagathas, Tri Ratna Buddhist Centre, Pekanbaru, Sumatra

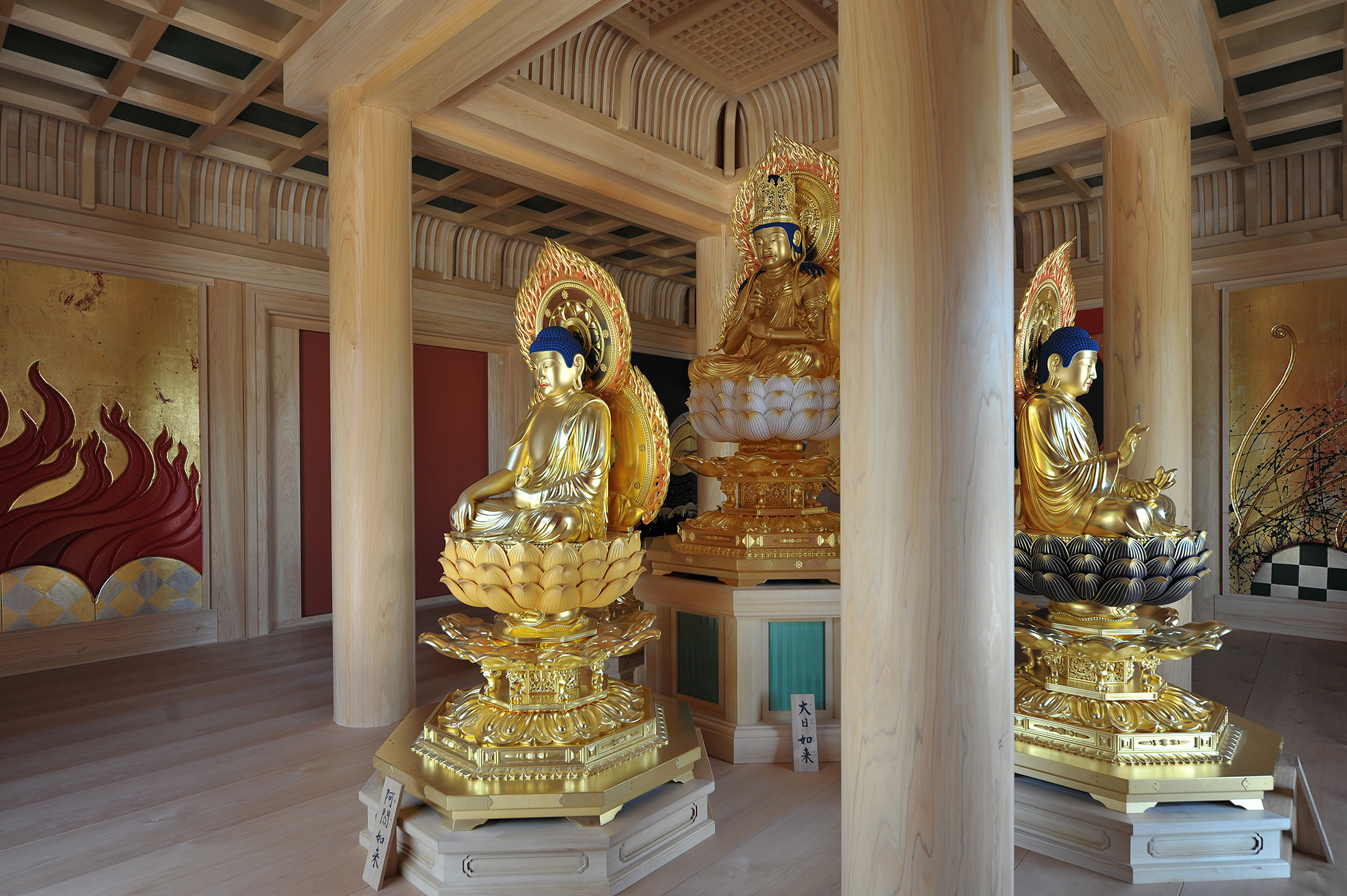
Renge-in Tanjō-ji

== See also ==
- Dharma
- Dharmadhatu
- Diamond Realm
- Four Paramatthas
- Garbhagriha
- List of the named Buddhas
- Trikaya
- Womb Realm

== Bibliography ==
- Bogle, George; Markham, Clements Robert; and Manning, Thomas (1999) Narratives of the Mission of George Bogle to Tibet and of the Journey of Thomas Manning to Lhasa ISBN 81-206-1366-X
- Bucknell, Roderick & Stuart-Fox, Martin (1986). The Twilight Language: Explorations in Buddhist Meditation and Symbolism. Curzon Press: London. ISBN 0-312-82540-4
- Sakya, Jnan Bahadur (compiler) (2002) [1995]. Short Description of Gods, Goddesses and Ritual Objects of Buddhism and Hinduism in Nepal (10th [reprint] ed.). Handicraft Association of Nepal. ISBN 99933-37-33-1.
