= Shanhua =

Shanhua (Chinese: 善化) may refer to the following places:

- Shanhua, Tainan, district in Taiwan
- Shanhua Temple, Buddhist temple in Shanxi Province, China
