= Shanhua Temple =

Temple in Datong, China

Coordinates: 40°05′09″N 113°17′37″E

- 善化寺
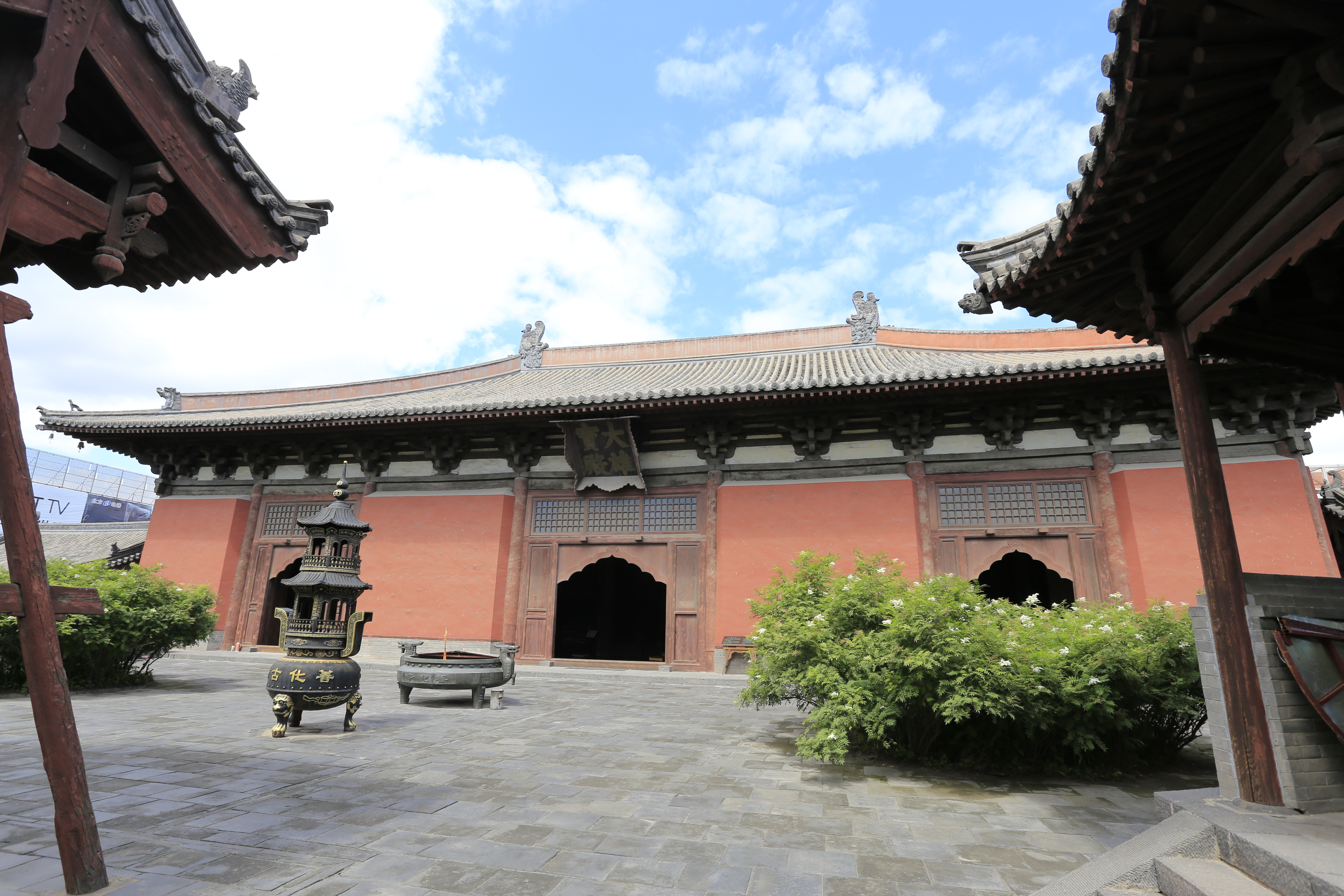
- The temple's Daxiongbao Hall

Religion
- Affiliation: Buddhist
- Province: Shanxi

Location
- Location: Datong
- Interactive map of Shanhua Temple

Architecture
- Completed: 12th century

Shanhua Temple (Chinese: 善化寺; pinyin: Shànhùa Sì) is a Buddhist temple located in Datong, Shanxi Province, China. The temple was first founded during the early 8th century of the Tang dynasty, but its earliest surviving building dates from the 11th century. The temple was heavily repaired over the years, and today three original halls and two recently rebuilt pavilions survive. The largest, and earliest hall, dating from the 11th-century Liao dynasty, is the Daxiongbao Hall and is one of the largest of its kind in China. Also historically significant are the Main Gate and Sansheng Hall, both dating from 12th century during the Jin dynasty.

== History ==
The Shanhua Temple was first founded during the Kaiyuan period of the Tang dynasty (713-741) under the patronage of emperor Xuanzong, at which time it was known as the Kaiyuan Temple. After the fall of the Tang dynasty during the Five Dynasties period (906-960), the temple underwent a name change and was known as Da Pu'ensi. During this chaotic time, out of ten buildings at the temple, only three or four escaped destruction. After the takeover by the Liao dynasty in 960, the temple assumed its present configuration.

The temple was again heavily damaged when the Jin dynasty took over in 1120, and in 1128 repair work was started that took fifteen years to complete. In 1421, more repairs were undertaken, this time by a monk named Dayong. In 1445, he received an imperial presentation of sutras. This is also the first time that the temple was referred to by its present name, Shanhua Temple. In the late 16th century, drum and bell towers were built on the same stone platform (yuetai, 月台) supporting the Daxiongbao Hall. Further repairs were made to the temple over the next two hundred years but by the late 18th century the temple was once again in a state of disrepair, and the use of one of the halls as a camel stable had caused a wall to collapse. During World War II, the Puxian pavilion was destroyed, and was rebuilt in 1953.

== Architecture ==
The Shanhua Temple today consists of three main halls (The Daxiongbao Hall, the Sansheng Hall and the Main Gate) arranged on a north–south axis and two pavilions located to the east and west of the Sansheng Hall. There are also two smaller halls on each side of the Daxiongbao Hall. The Daxiongbao Halls were all first built during the Liao dynasty (907-1125), but only the Daxiongbao Hall is now considered a Liao era Building. The Main Gate and Sansheng Hall were extensively renovated during the subsequent Jin dynasty, and are classified by scholars as being Jin era buildings.

=== Daxiongbao Hall ===
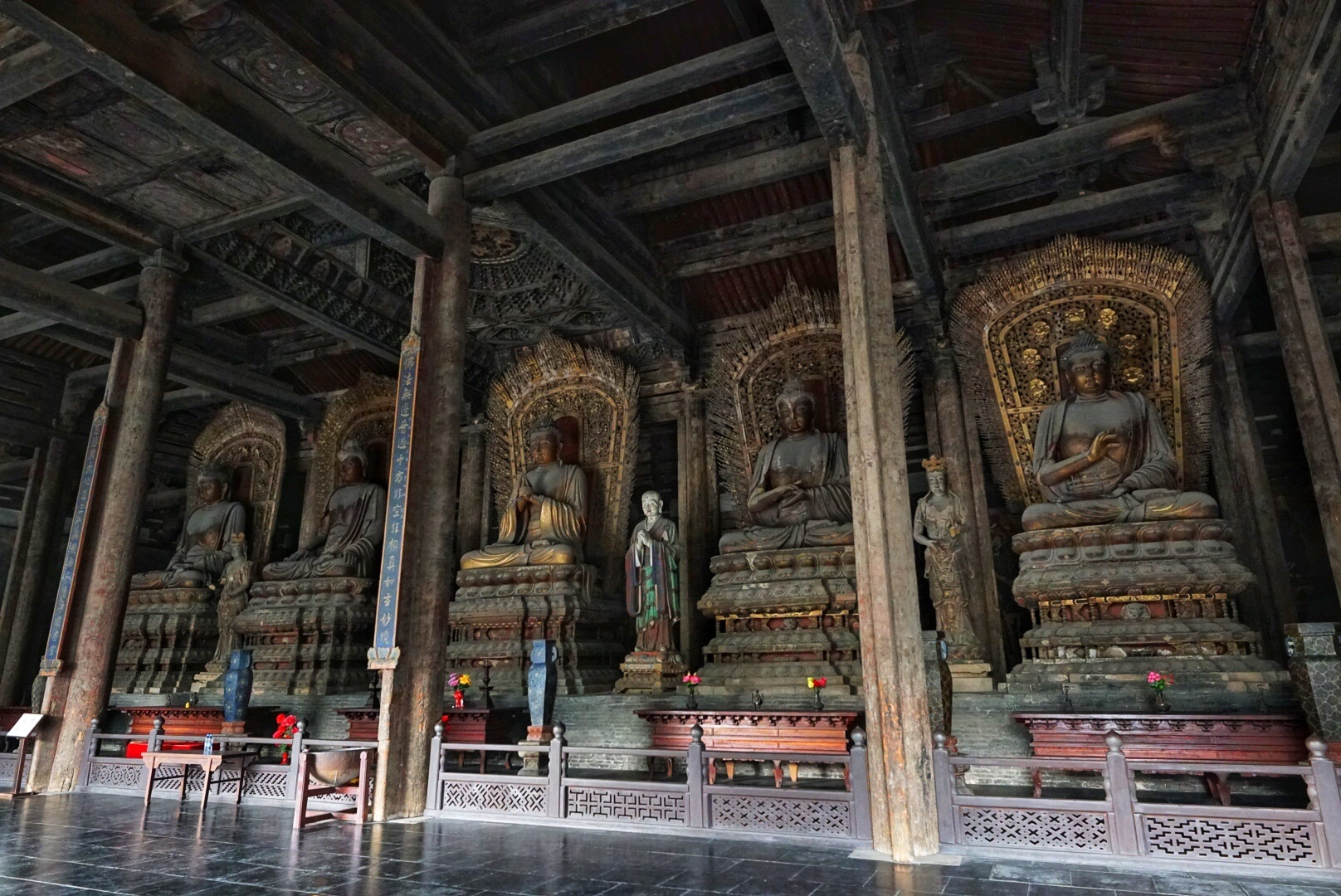
Jin Dynasty (1115–1234) statues of the Five Tathagathas in the Daxiongbao Hall

The Daxiongbao Hall (大雄宝殿, Dàxíongbǎo Diàn) is the northernmost and largest hall, and dates from the 11th century. It measures seven by five bays (40.5 by 25 m) and has three doors at the front of the hall. The hall is built on an elevated three meter high platform that was once the site of both a drum and bell tower that are no longer extant. According to the standards in the 11th-century Chinese architectural treatise Yingzao Fashi, the hall is held up by fifth rank bracket sets (鋪作) in a system of eight ranks. The interior contains Jin dynasty era statues of the Five Tathāgatas (Chinese: 五方佛; pinyin: Wǔfāngfó): Mahavairocana, Amoghasiddhi, Amitābha, Akshohya and Ratnasambhava, who are the five Buddhas that feature prominently in Chinese Esoteric Buddhist tradition. Above the statues is a caisson (Chinese: 藻井; pinyin: zǎojǐng), an octagonal wooden ceiling that is painted and decorated.

Along with other statues of disciples and attendants grouped with the large statues, there are also statues of the Twenty-Four Celestial Devas located next to the east and west walls. There are 190 square meters of murals in the hall. They date from 1708 to 1716, but have been damaged over the years.

=== Sansheng Hall ===
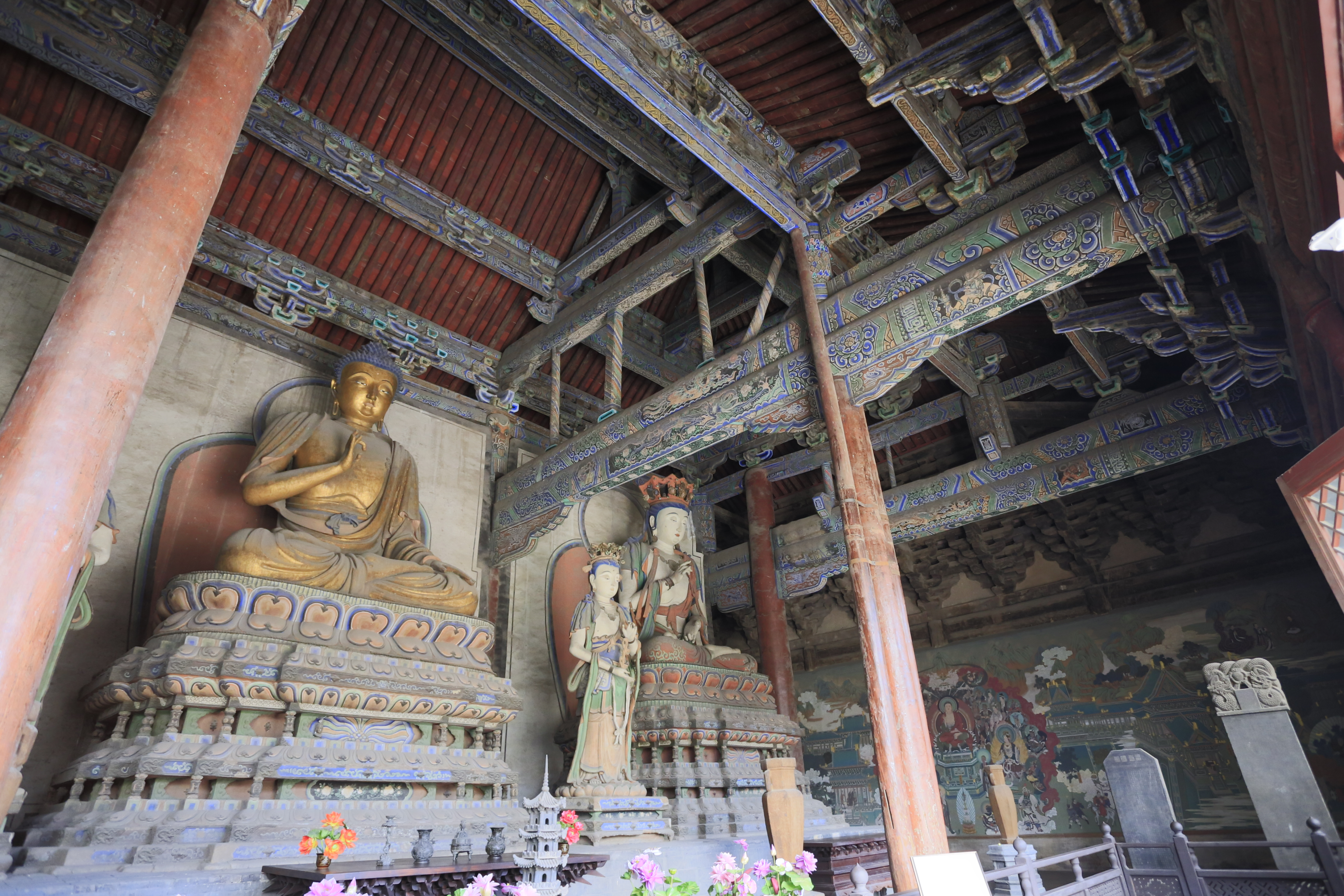
Interior of the Sansheng Hall, enshrining statues of Vairocana, Manjusri and Samantabhadra

The Sansheng Hall (Chinese: 三圣殿; pinyin: Sānshèng Diàn; lit. 'Hall of Three Sages') is the middle hall, and was built during the Jin dynasty. It houses statues of the three sages of the Avatamsaka Sutra - a central one of Vairocana (the universal aspect of Shakyamuni) and two accompanying statues of Manjusri and Samantabhadra. The hall has very few central pillars for its support and depends on complex rafters and brackets of the 6th rank for its support.

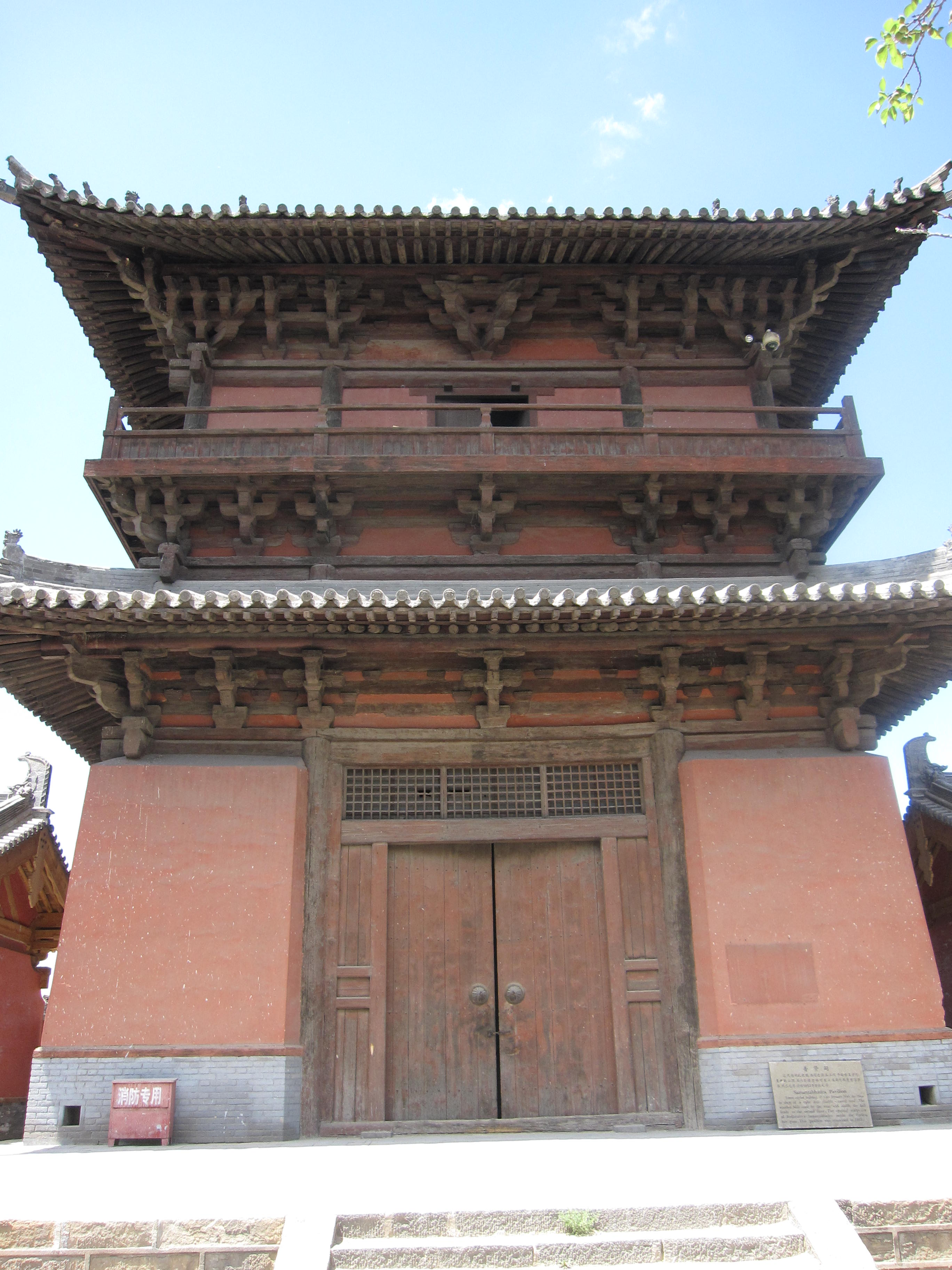
The Puxian Pavilion

=== Puxian Pavilion ===
The Puxian Pavilion (Chinese: 普贤阁; pinyin: Pǔxián Gé) was initially built during the Liao dynasty, and was examined by Liang Sicheng in the 1930s. He reported a heavily damaged structure with two stories. On the first story was a miniature building and niche with two images. On the top story was a statue of the Bodhisattva Samantabhadra.

The building was rebuilt in 1953 after having been destroyed during the war. The pavilion measures three bays by two, but is nearly a perfect square. It is built on a short stone platform called a yuetai (月台) which is accessed by a short set of stairs. While from the outside, the pavilion appears to only have two stories, there are actually three, with the second floor being hidden from outside view. Each of the exterior levels is surrounded by a perimeter of columns.

=== Wenshu Pavilion ===
This pavilion (Chinese: 文殊阁; pinyin: Wénshū Gé) was destroyed in the early 20th century after it caught fire after being converted into a tannery. It was rebuilt in 2008 by the local government.

=== Main Gate ===
The Main Gate (Chinese: 山门; pinyin: Shān Mén) is a large hall that was built during the Jin dynasty in the 12th century, and is the entrance building of the temple. The hall contains statues of the four heavenly kings, with two on the east side, and two on the west side. It is five bays long, and two bays wide and has an area of 278 square meters. The brackets used to support the structure are of the 5th rank.
