= Kongō Sanmai-in =

Coordinates: 34°12′36.7″N 135°35′13.1″E

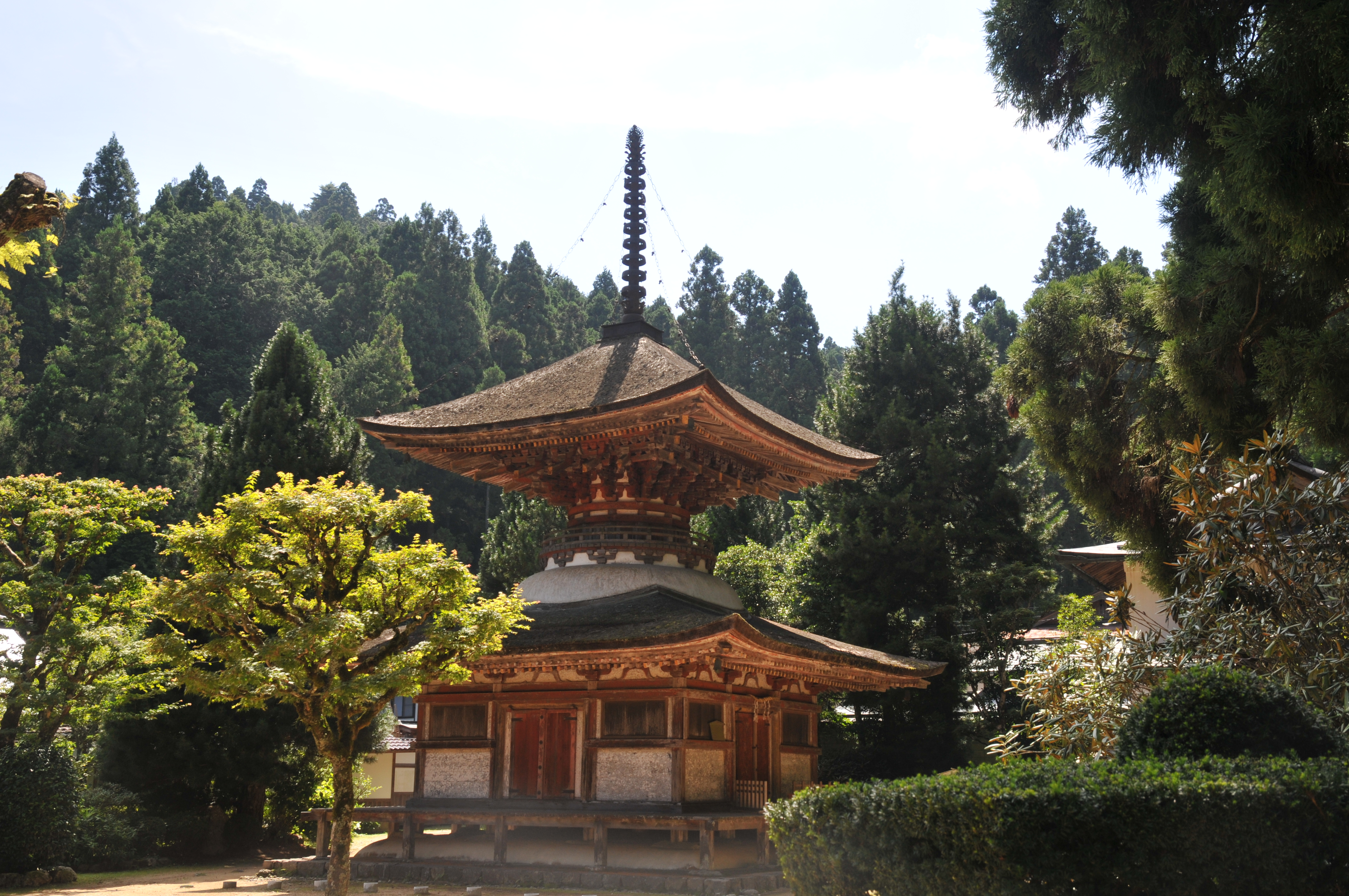
one of the Kongo Sanmai-in temples

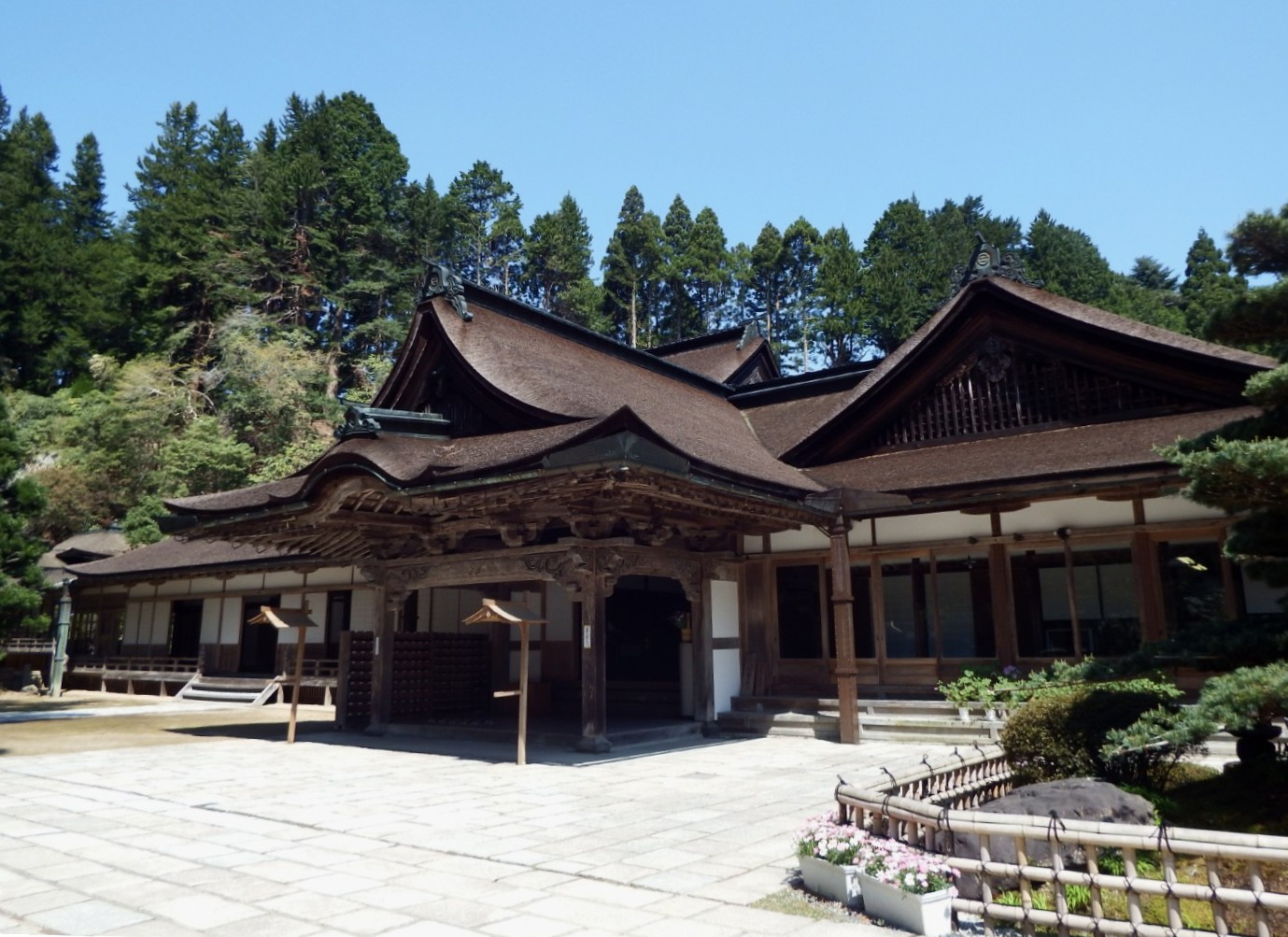

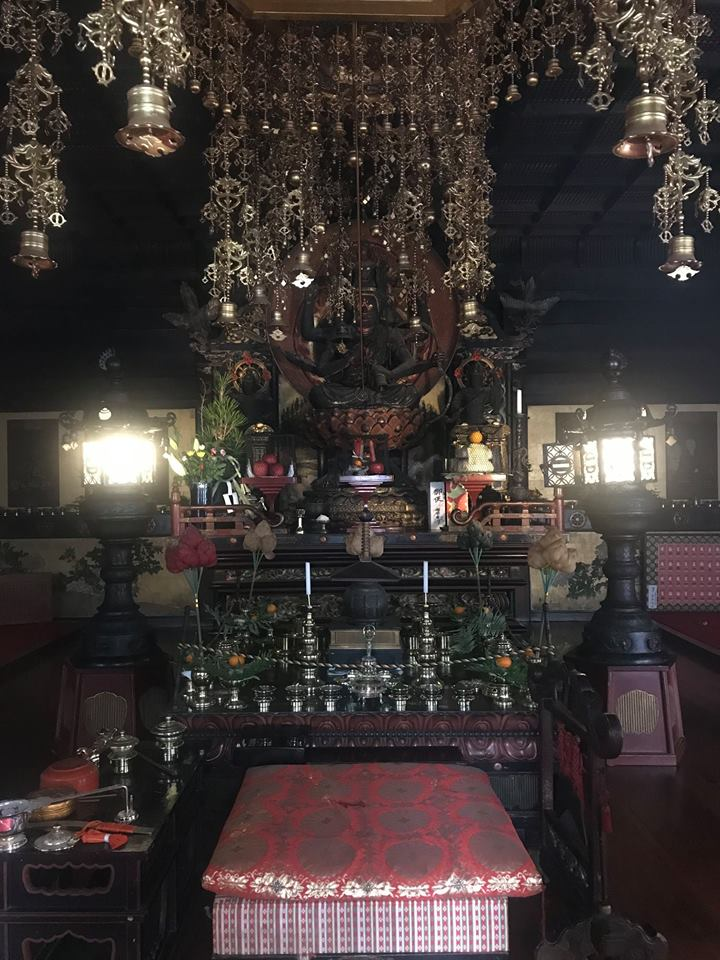
Rāgarāja

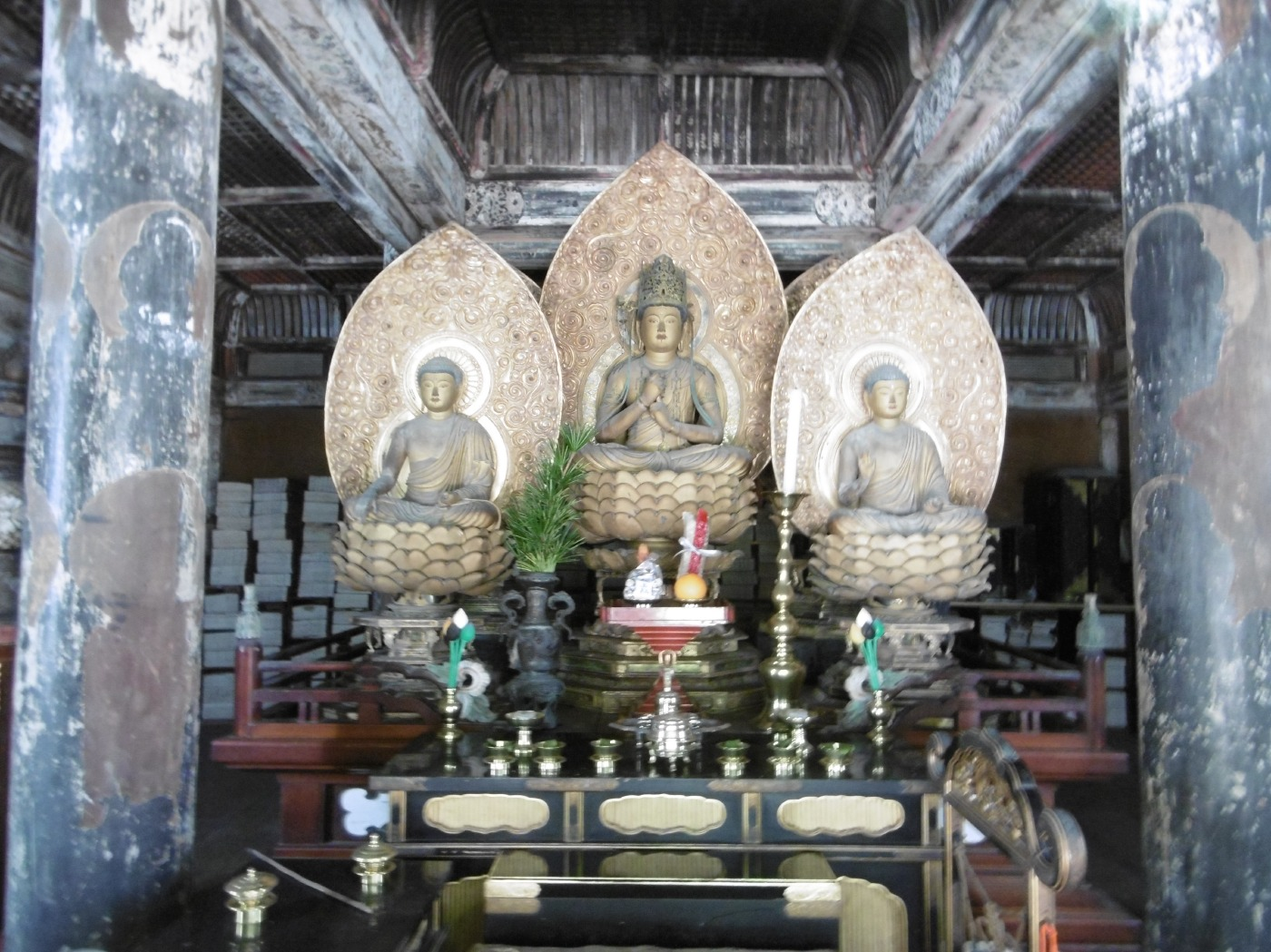
Vairocana

Kongō Sanmai-in (金剛三昧院, Kongō Sanmai-in) is a minor temple complex on Mount Kōya in Japan, founded in 1211 by order of Hōjō Masako for posthumous soul of Minamoto no Yoritomo and renamed "Kongō Sanmai-in" in 1219 for that of Minamoto no Sanetomo.

== Hibutsu ==
The temple houses a hibutsu ("secret Buddha") statue which is generally hidden and displayed for only one day every five hundred years. It will next be on display in the late 2400s.
