= Mandala of the Two Realms =

Key mandala in East Asian Esoteric Buddhism

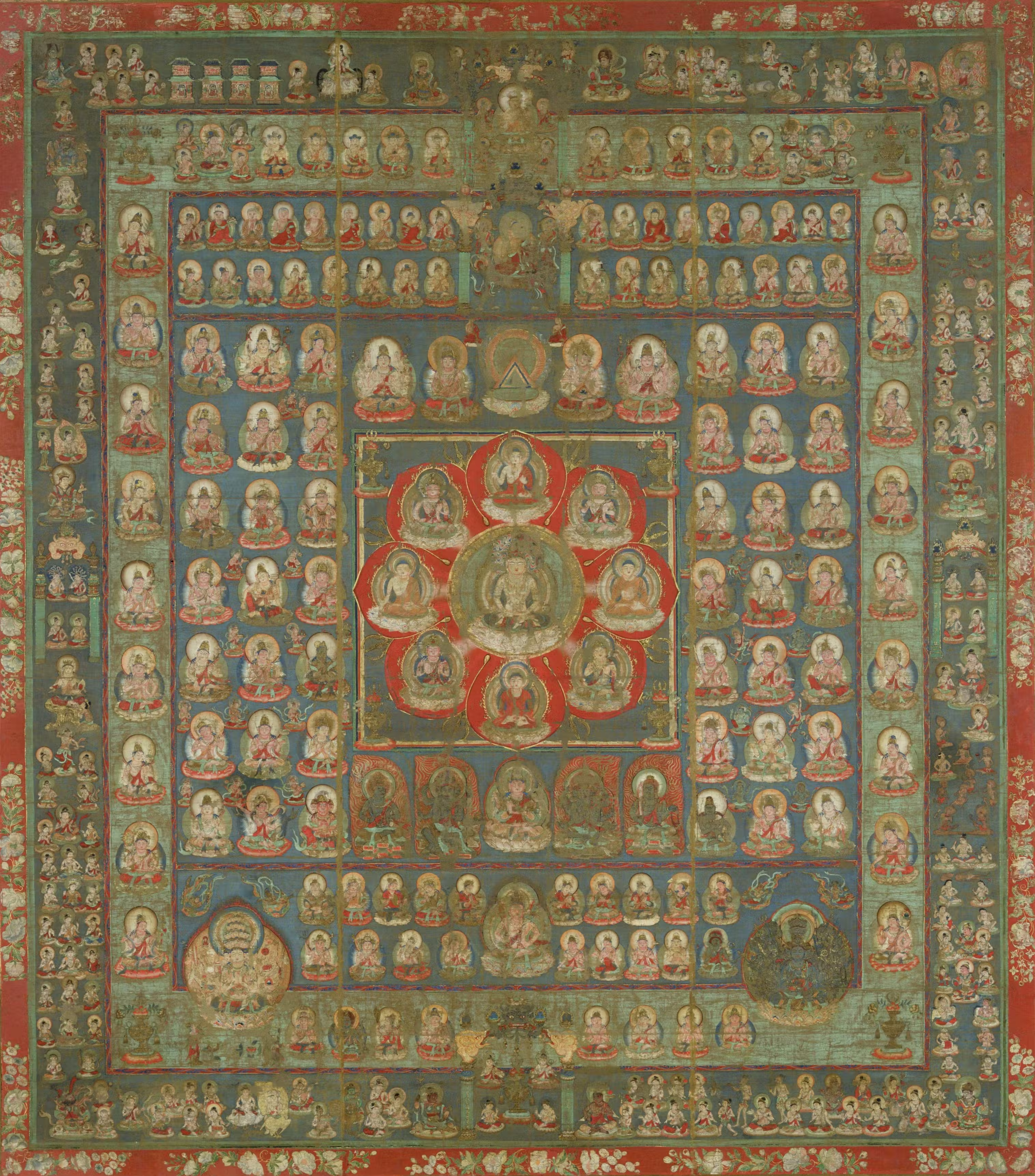
Garbhadhātu (Womb Realm) maṇḍala with Mahāvairocana at the center.

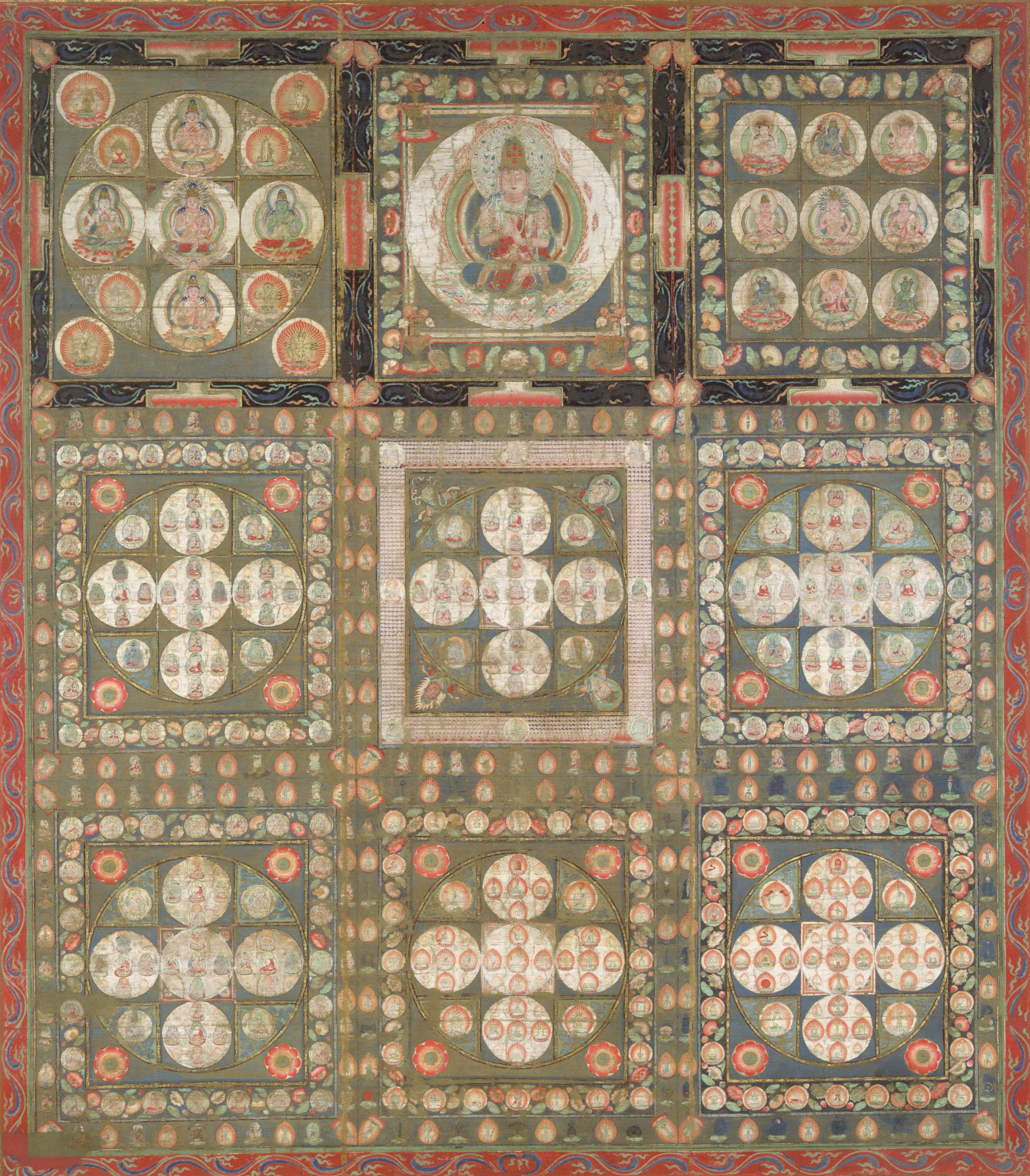
Vajradhātu (Vajra Realm) Mandala

The Mandala of the Two Realms (Traditional Chinese: 両界曼荼羅; Pinyin: Liǎngjiè màntúluó; Rōmaji: Ryōkai mandara), also known as the Mandala of the Two Divisions (Traditional Chinese: 両部曼荼羅; Pinyin: Liǎngbù màntúluó; Rōmaji: Ryōbu mandara), is a set of two mandalas in East Asian Esoteric Buddhism, particularly prominent within Chinese Esoteric Buddhism as well as the Shingon and Tendai traditions of Japanese Buddhism. The Dual Mandala comprises two complementary mandalas: the Womb Realm Mandala (Sanskrit: garbhakoṣadhātu, Traditional Chinese: 胎蔵界曼荼羅; Pinyin: Tāizāngjiè màntúluó; Rōmaji: Taizōkai mandara) associated with compassion and the Vajra Realm Mandala (Sanskrit: vajradhātu, Traditional Chinese: 金剛界曼荼羅; pinyin: Jīngāngjiè màntúluó; rōmaji: Kongōkai mandara) associated with wisdom. The Dual Mandalas represent distinct yet non-dual dimensions of the enlightened cosmos centered on the universal Buddha Mahāvairocana (Chinese: 大日如來; pinyin: Dàrì Rúlái; rōmaji: Dainichi Nyorai).

The Mandala of the Two Worlds encapsulates the cosmology, metaphysics, and soteriology of East Asian Esoteric Buddhism. It provides both a visual and ritual method for realizing the practitioner's inherent identity with the Buddha, through the integration of compassion and wisdom. It is thus a symbolic teaching device, a meditative tool, and a ritual instrument. The Dual Mandalas portray two complementary dimensions of Buddhahood. The Womb Realm represents the great compassion (maha karuṇā) of the original Buddha Mahāvairocana who is always nurturing all beings toward enlightenment. The Vajra Realm signifies the indestructible omniscient wisdom (sārvajñana) of Mahāvairocana Buddha which pervades all phenomena. Thus, the Two Worlds Mandala provides a complete map of the cosmos as a unified field of compassion and wisdom which is used by an esoteric practitioner, through ritual and meditative identification with the deities of the mandalas, to progressively actualizes their own original enlightenment.

Both mandalas present highly systematized arrays of buddhas, bodhisattvas, wisdom kings, and celestial beings. The number of deities arranged around the cores varies, but may range as high as 414. Each figure holds specific mudrās (hand gestures) and attributes, and is associated with specific seed syllables (bīja). Both mandalas are oriented according to the cardinal directions, with symbolic meaning attached to each direction. Specific colors are also employed symbolically, representing particular virtues, or elements.

Japanese Shingon and Tendai temples often prominently display the Mandalas of the Two Realms mounted at right angles to the image platform on the central altar. The two mandalas are believed to have evolved separately in India, and were joined for the first time in China, perhaps by Kūkai's teacher Huiguo (746–805).

== Indian background ==
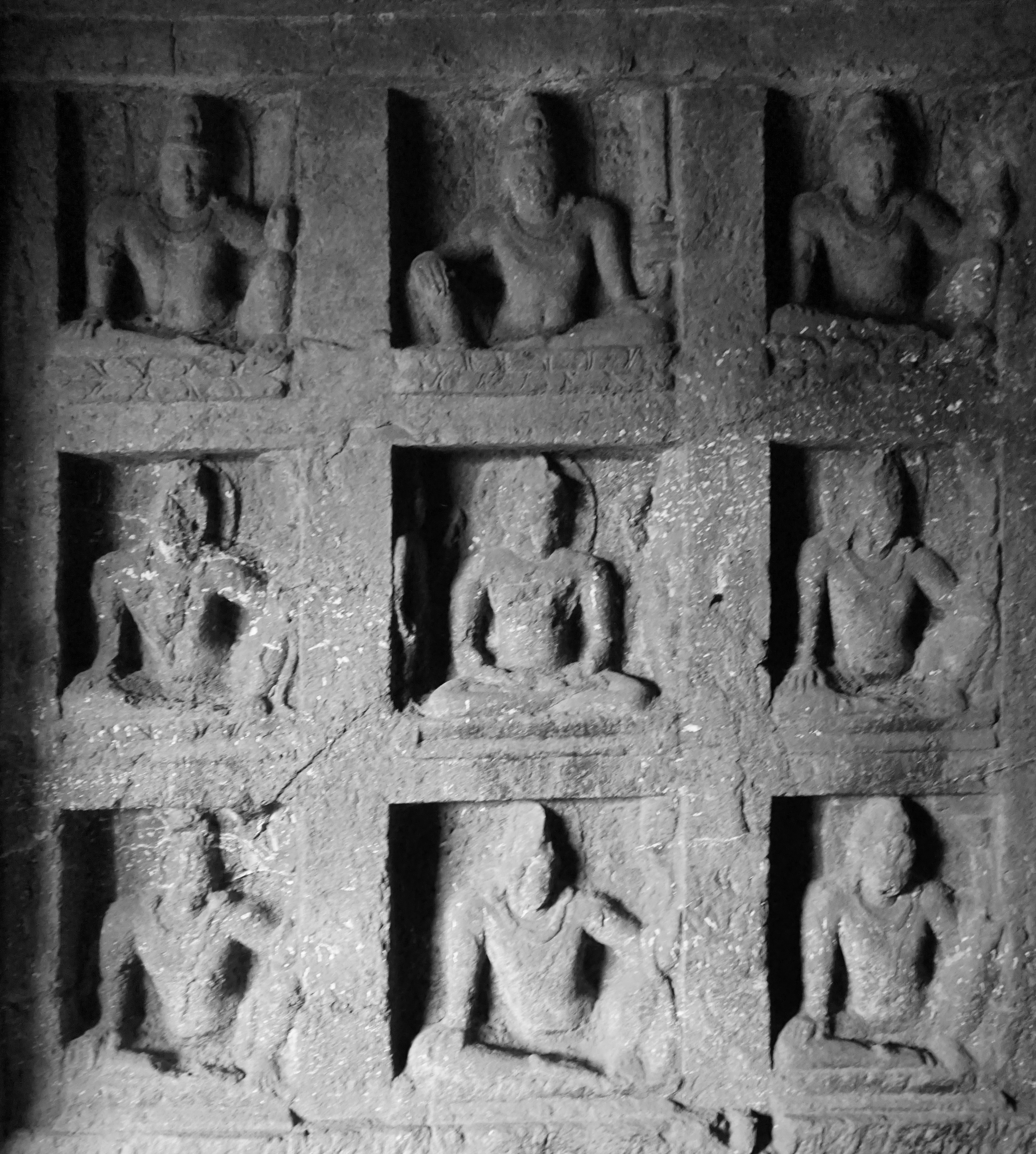
Relief of eight great bodhisattvas at Ellora Caves (cave no. 12) in a nine square pattern.

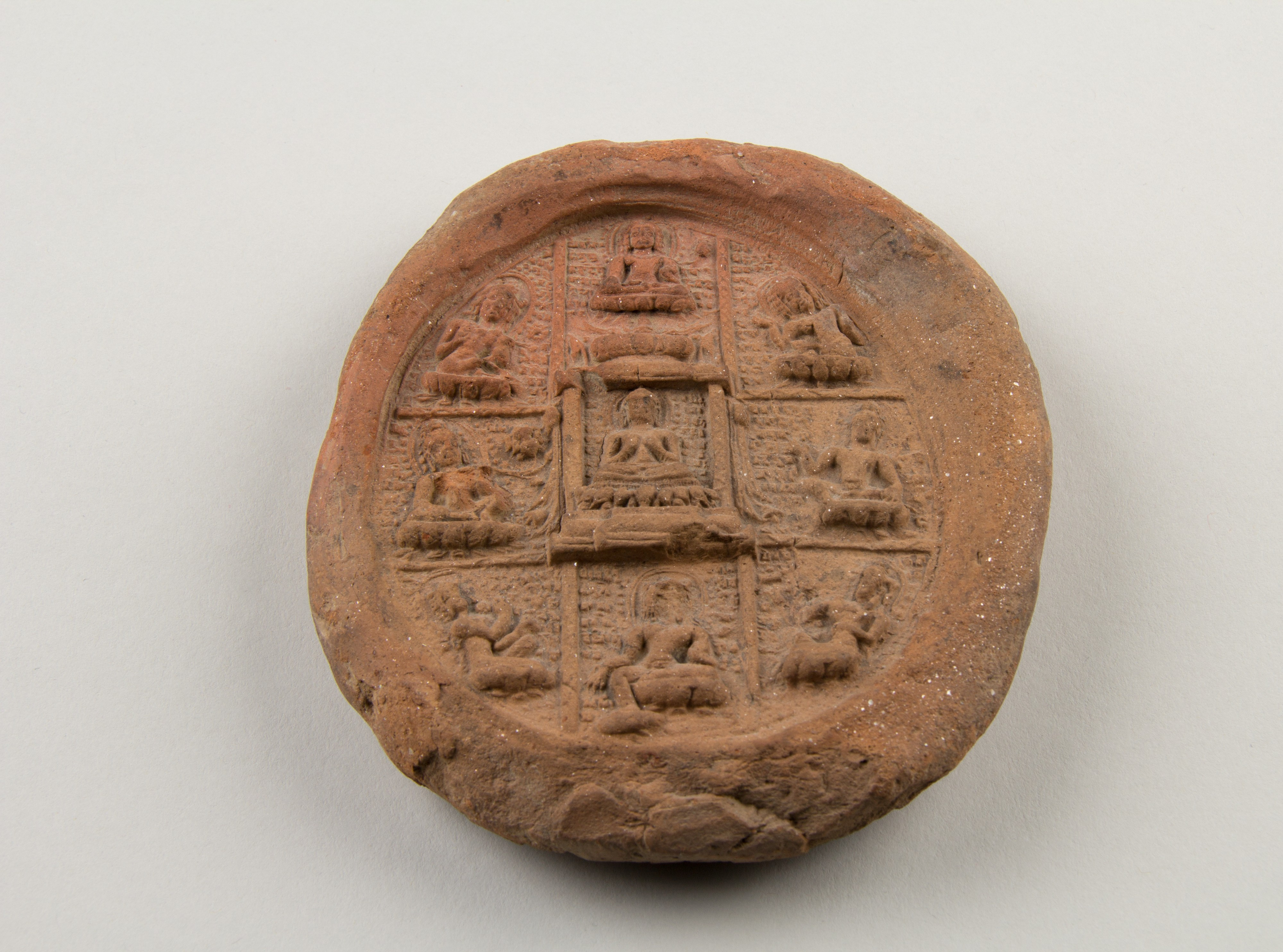
Indian Terracotta mandala, c. 6th century

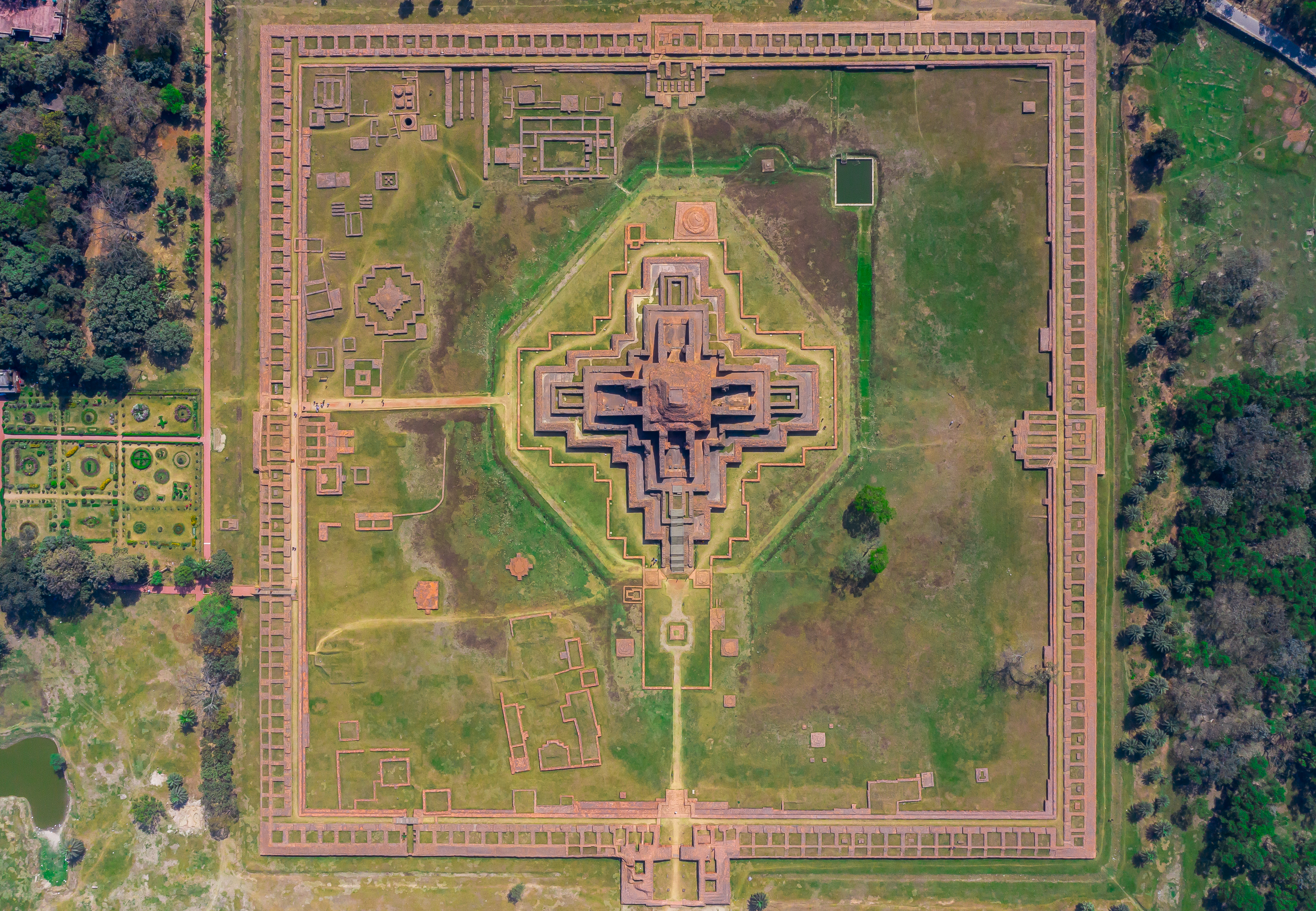
Somapura Mahavihara's four directional square layout

The conceptual and textual foundations of the Two Worlds Mandala derive from Indian Esoteric Buddhism (Mantrayāna), specifically from two seminal scriptures: the Mahāvairocana Sūtra and the Vajraśekhara Sūtra. Both texts represent advanced stages of Buddhist tantric development in India, reflecting sophisticated ritual systems, mantra theory, and visualization practices intended to rapidly actualize the practitioner's identity with the cosmic Buddha.

The Great Compassion Womb Realm Mandala is primarily based on the Mahāvairocana Sūtra (Chinese: 大日經; pinyin: Dàrì jīng; rōmaji: Dainichi kyō), while the Vajra-realm Mandala is based on the Vajraśekhara Sūtra (Chinese: 金剛頂經; pinyin: Jīngāngdǐng jīng; rōmaji: Kongōchō kyō). The Mahāvairocana Sūtra is said to have been compiled around the mid-7th century in India. Its first chapter provides a Madhyamaka like teaching on emptiness. On the other hand, the Vajraśekhara Sūtra is a compilation of several works, compiled in India beginning at the end of the 7th century. Its orientation is closer to Yogacara Mind-only Buddhism and buddha-nature thought. These sutras draw on previous Mahayana iconography and deities to develop a much more complex esoteric ritual complex. While the Mahāvairocana Sūtra and the Vajraśekhara Sūtra both take Mahāvairocana Buddha as their central theme, they are scriptures of different lineages, composed independently at different times and in different regions of India, and transmitted separately to China.

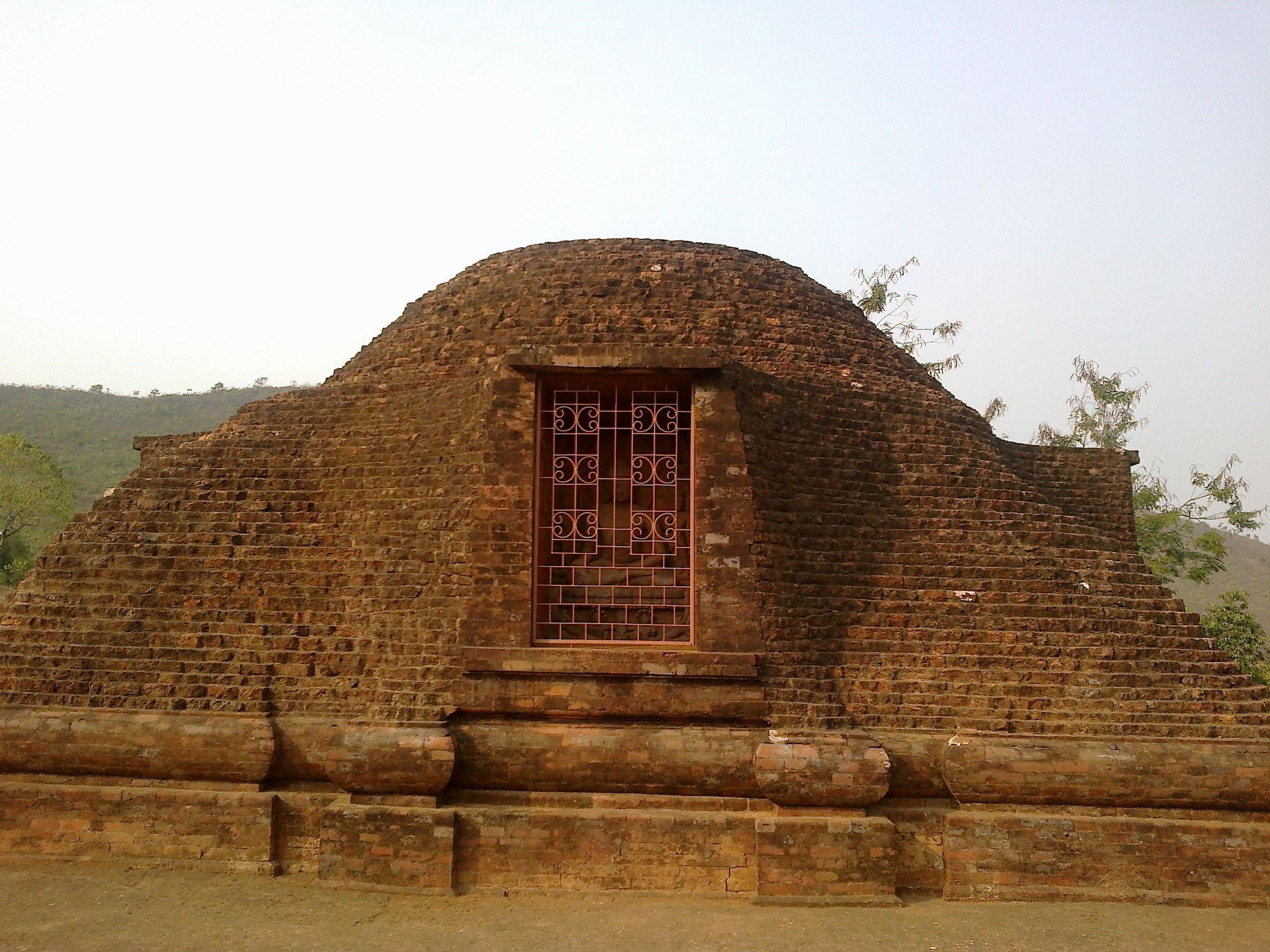
Main stupa at Udayagiri Buddhist Complex with four Buddhas enshrined at four niches facing the four cardinal directions

In Buddhist India, mandalas were often earthen platforms or designs on the ground with cow dung or clay, along with paint or colored powder used for esoteric rituals. They represented the true nature and pattern of all reality as well as the enlightened wisdom of the Buddhas. In China, these designs evolved into permanent paintings or textiles. In some cases, an entire temple complex could be a mandala. Perhaps the most famous example of such a large scale mandala is the Indonesian Buddhist site of Borobudur.

The tradition of laying out Buddhist deities in a sacred diagram (i.e. a mandala) corresponding to the main cardinal directions is not unique to esoteric Buddhist texts. These diagrams first appear in Mahayana sutras like the Sutra of Golden Light (c. 5th century) and the Sukhāvatīvyūha Sūtra. The Golden Light Sutra describes a mandala with Shakyamuni in the center, surrounded by Ratnaketu (south), Amitayus (west), Dundubhisvara (north) and Aksobhya (east) Buddhas. According to Orzech and Sørensen "The Buddhist cave-temples of Kanheri and at Ellora in the Deccan contain what may be the earliest extant examples of rudimentary mandalas in the form of geometric matrices containing Buddhist divinities."

Examples of four Buddhas arranged in the four cardinal directions with the Buddha relics at the center chamber (called a garbha) have also been found in Indian Buddhist stupas like Sanchi stupa, Udayagiri stupa, Jajpur stupa (Pushpagiri) and Dekhinath stupa (Gyaraspur). The Udayagiri stupa for example, houses Vairocana, Amitabha, Aksobhya and Ratnasambhava in the four cardinal directions of the stupa.

According to Kimiaki Tanaka, this basic model of four cardinal directions Buddhas surrounding a central core was combined with Vairocana Buddha from the Avatamsaka sutra, and developed into later diagrams depicting the Buddha families of the Five Tathagatas (which changed the other two Buddhas' names to Amoghasiddhi and Ratnasambhava).

Pamela Winfield describes the original Buddhist context of the mandala as follows:

the mandala is a two-dimensional blue-print for a three-dimensional palace or imperial city. It is an architectural construct that provides a visual metaphor for the majesty of the macrocosmic universe, and in some contexts, for the sovereignty of the meditator’s own microcosmic body-speech-mind complex. The colorful buddhas who reside within the mandala-palace are usually depicted in royal garb holding imperial regalia, as they preside over their enlightened realms as befitting any cakravartin (virtuous world-ruler). Retinues of bodhisattvas in princely attire represent powerful regents for realizing specific enlightened virtues (e.g. all-seeing compassion, diamond-like wisdom, the ability to use appropriate and “skillful means” [S. upāya] effectively). For the initiate attuned to Buddhism’s elaborate iconographic code, these enlightened and enlightening figures carry both ontological as well as soteriological significance as they reside in and regally preside over their perfected environments.

== Chinese Mantrayana ==
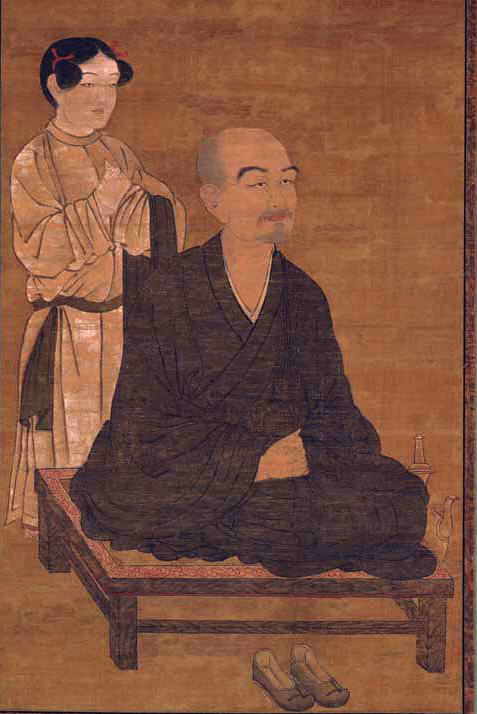
Painting of Huiguo with an attendant. Japan, Kamakura period (14th century).

The Mahāvairocana Sūtra was translated into Chinese by the Indian monk Śubhakarasiṃha (Chinese: 善無畏; pinyin: Shànwúwèi; rōmaji: Zenmui, 637–735) together with his Chinese disciple, Yixing (Chinese: 一行; pinyin: Yīxíng; rōmaji: Ichigyō; 683–727), around 725 CE. Meanwhile, the Vajraśekhara Sūtra was translated into Chinese around the same time by the Indian monk Vajrabodhi (Chinese: 金剛智; pinyin: Jīngāngzhì; rōmaji: Kongōchi; 671–741) and his disciple Amoghavajra (Chinese: 不空; pinyin: Bùkōng; rōmaji: Fukū; 705–774). These figures were the key founders of Chinese Esoteric Buddhism (Chinese: 密宗; pinyin: Mìzōng). Each of the esoteric lineages associated with these two sutras also included teachings and instructions on how to draw and construct maṇḍalas (Chinese: 曼荼羅; pinyin: màntúluó). The earliest Chinese sources (6th century) use the term “tan (壇,” “altar” or “platform”) instead of "mandala", indicating how these mandalas were placed or construction on some raised platform. Some examples of early Chinese mandalas have survived in the Mogao Caves.

According to the Shingon tradition, the person who integrated the teachings of these two scriptural lineages and mandalas and composed them into the form of the Two Worlds Mandala as unified system was the Tang Dynasty monk Master Huiguo (746–805), who was also the teacher of Kūkai. Master Huiguo, believing that the profound mysteries of Esoteric Buddhism could not be conveyed by words, ordered the court painter Li Zhen to create depictions such as the Two Worlds Mandala, and transmitted them to Kūkai. In Tang China, mandalas based on the Mahāvairocana and Vajraśekhara systems were used for esoteric initiations (abhiṣeka) and esoteric yogas.

Due to later suppression of Buddhism, especially during the Huichang Persecution (c. 845 CE), Esoteric Buddhism in China did not maintain institutional prominence and eventually disappeared as an organized tradition. However, esoteric elements survived within other schools, including Tiantai, Huayan and Chan. For instance, one popular version of the Shuilu Fahui ceremony was heavily influenced by the Vajradhātu Esoteric tradition and involved building an array of altars that largely resembles the Vajradhātu maṇḍala, as well as visualizations of seed-syllables and the conferment of samaya precepts. This version was widely performed up until the late-Qing dynasty (1644-1912). In the modern era, Chinese Esoteric Buddhism was revived by Chinese figures who traveled to Japan to study esoteric Buddhism there and receive the required initiations, training and texts.

=== Theory ===
The Sanskrit term "mandala" ("circle") was glossed and interpreted in different ways in Chinese Esoteric Buddhism. Main glosses include: the mandala as "perfectly endowed" (with all virtues); as the "highest incomparable flavor"; as the "assembly" which brings together all powers of Buddhahood; as that which is the "generation" of all Buddha-bodies, mantras, meanings and the three secrets; and as the place of meditation and awakening (Bodhimaṇḍa).

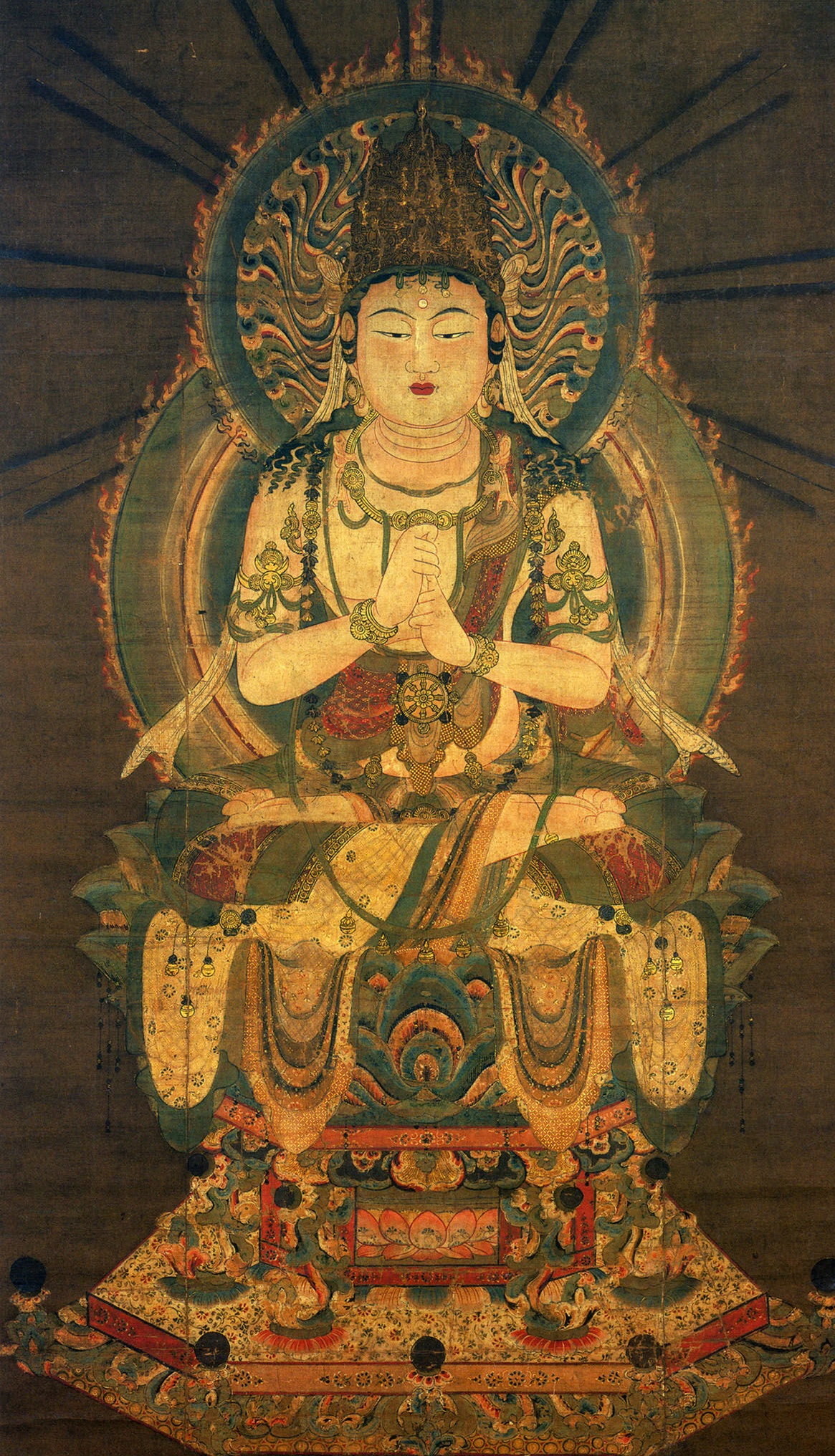
12th century painting of Mahavairocana, Heian period, Nezu Museum.

Yixing's Notes on the Mahāvairocana Sūtra (Chinese: 大日經疏; pinyin: Dàrì jīng shū; rōmaji: Dainichi kyō sho) explains that the mandala is an expression of the "essence of the Buddha's enlightenment", because "the truth of the form and mind of all living beings is, from the beginning, in equality of the wisdom body of Mahavairocana Buddha". He further writes that the Buddha, out of compassion, "develops the inexhaustible, sublime repository great mandala" out of the basis of his own mind and that of sentient beings. As such, the universal wisdom of Buddhahood gives rise to myriad manifestations in order to guide all beings, and the mandala is a symbolic representation of this Buddha's activity.

Thus, the mandala is a manifestation of Mahāvairocana Buddha. This is a transcendent cosmic Buddha who is the ultimate truth itself (i.e. the Dharmakaya) and whose manifest body is the entire universe in a macro sense, and the individual human body (as microcosmos). Realizing our non-duality with this ultimate Buddha is the goal of Esoteric Buddhist practice, and this is achieved through wisdom into the empty nature of all things, which is also the Dharmakāya Buddha. This Dharma body is not just a blank static emptiness, it is an active force which teaches, guides and nurtures all beings like a mother.

=== Mandala variations ===
Most mandalas in the East Asian tradition are in the form of a "Great Mandala", which depicts the individual images of each deity in human form, using a two dimensional illustration like a textile or a painting. There are three other styles of depicting mandalas:

- The Dharma Mandala, in which each Buddha is symbolically represented by a single letter in Siddhaṃ script;
- The Samaya Mandala, which depicts each Buddha with a symbolic samaya form, symbolically representing the inner realization of that Buddha;
- The Karma Mandala, three dimensional mandalas, usually with Buddha images arranged within a monastery hall following such a layout, but could also include larger mandalas constructed outside in a field using Buddha statues.

These four types of mandala are collectively called the Four Mandalas (Jp. Shishu Mandara) in East Asian Esoteric Buddhism.

=== Practice ===
The Mandala is one of the three key elements of East Asian Esoteric Buddhism, along with Mudra, and Mantra. While each of these elements preceded the development of mature esoteric Buddhism, the use of all three simultaneously (along with abhiṣeka ritual initiation) is the defining element of Mantrayana Buddhism. These "three modes of action" or "ritual technologies" are often tied to the concept of the "Three Mysteries" (Chinese: 三密; pinyin: Sānmì; rōmaji: Sanmitsu), the "secrets" of body, speech and mind. According to vajracarya Śubhākarasiṃha, "The three modes of action are simply the three secrets, and the three secrets are simply the three modes of action. The three bodies are simply the wisdom of tathāgata Mahavairocana."

To be allowed to practice the yogic methods of Mantrayana Buddhism, one was required to be initiated into the mandala through the ritual of abhiseka (lit. "ablution"). Orzech and Sørensen describe the tantric ritual of abhiseka as follows:

The vows are whispered in the ear of the candidate as he or she first prepares to enter the mandala. While blindfolded, the aspirant tosses a flower onto the mandala to establish a karmic affinity with a particular deity of the mandala. The blindfold is removed and the aspirant then glimpses the mandala for the first time. On the following day the initiate will begin the process of learning how to visualize the deities of the mandala—usually Mahāvairocana and Vajrasattva.

Afterwards, the initiate is taught the secret mudras and mantras of his deity by the vajracarya (tantric vajra master), and these secrets are revealed to be none other than the direct expression of Buddhahood itself. Through the use of these "three mysteries," the initiate is seen to ritually manifest the body, speech, and mind of the Buddha.

== In Japanese Esoteric Buddhism ==
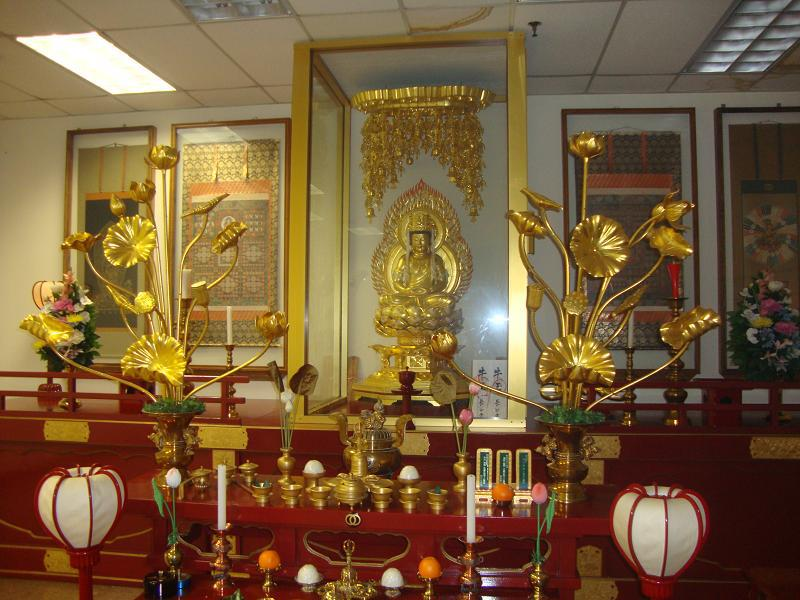
A Shingon altar with Dainichi Nyorai flanked by the Dual Mandalas

While the two mandalas of the vajra and womb realms come from two different esoteric scriptures and traditions, they are always understood as two parts of a single entity in Japanese esoteric Buddhism, which follows the lead of Huiguo in merging the two systems. In Japanese Esoteric Buddhism, the Dual Mandala is seen as representing the theme of the non-duality between embodied human beings and Buddhas and thus the possibility of attaining "buddhahood in this very body" (sokushin-jōbutsu).

When Kūkai (774–835) completed his study in Tang China under Huiguo, he returned to Japan in 806 CE, bringing the Dual Mandalas with him and introducing them to Japan for the first time. When Kūkai presented a list of the items he brought back to Japan to the emperor he explained the significance of the pictorial mandalas as follows:

The dharma is fundamentally wordless, but without words it is not manifest . . . As the esoteric treasury is deep and mysterious and difficult to record, [the teachings] are revealed for the unenlightened through pictures. The various devices and mudrās are produced of the great compassion [of Mahāvairocana]. A single viewing can transform one into Buddha. The secrets of the sūtras and commentaries are inscribed in these pictures and images, and the essential realities of the esoteric repository is contained therein.

The original copy of the colored Two Worlds Mandala (the Root Mandala) that Kūkai brought back, as well as the first copied version created in Kōnin 12 (821 CE), were stored at Tō-ji but have been lost. The Two Worlds Mandala (commonly known as the Takao Mandala) preserved at Jingo-ji Temple in Kyoto, although not colored but rather rendered on purple damask with gold and silver paint, is considered to faithfully reproduce either the original Root Mandala.

The dual mandala contains the central symbols and deities of the Japanese Buddhist esotericism of the Shingon and Tendai traditions. In Japanese Buddhist esotericism (Mikkyō), the dual mandala is an expression of Buddhahood conveyed through painted forms. As Kūkai writes, the "secret repository" of Buddhahood is "profound and mysterious, and difficult to convey in writing. Thus we borrow pictures to point to what is to be realized."

In the ritual esoteric initiations practiced in these traditions, new initiates are blindfolded and asked to toss a flower upon a mandala. Where the flower lands helps decide which Buddhist figure the student should devote themselves to. The mandalas are also a major element of Esoteric Buddhist deity yogas and other rituals. As the central iconography of the Shingon sect, the dual mandala has a prominent place in traditional Shingon halls. The Vajra Realm Mandala is typically hung on the west wall symbolizing the final realization of Mahāvairocana Buddha, while the Womb Realm Mandala is hung on the east wall, symbolizing the young stage of Mahāvairocana Buddha.

In Shingon esotericism (known as Tōmitsu), the Dual Mandala became the centerpiece of doctrinal exegesis, ritual activity, and yogic practices. Kūkai articulated the principle of the "Identity of the Two Mandalas" (両部不二, Ryōbu Funi), emphasizing that compassion and wisdom are non-dual expressions of the same reality. All major Shingon rituals, such as the Abhiṣeka Initiation Ceremony (灌頂), Goma Fire Ritual (護摩供), and Shingon tantric meditations are all based on the iconography and symbolic universe of the Dual Mandala.

The Dual Mandala is also central to the Esoteric Buddhism of the Tendai school, known as Taimitsu. Its founder Saichō introduced esoteric study and practice into the Tendai school and later Tendai figures like Ennin and Enchin traveled to China and brought back further transmissions, esoteric Buddhist texts and ritual implements, like mandalas.

== Womb Realm Mandala ==
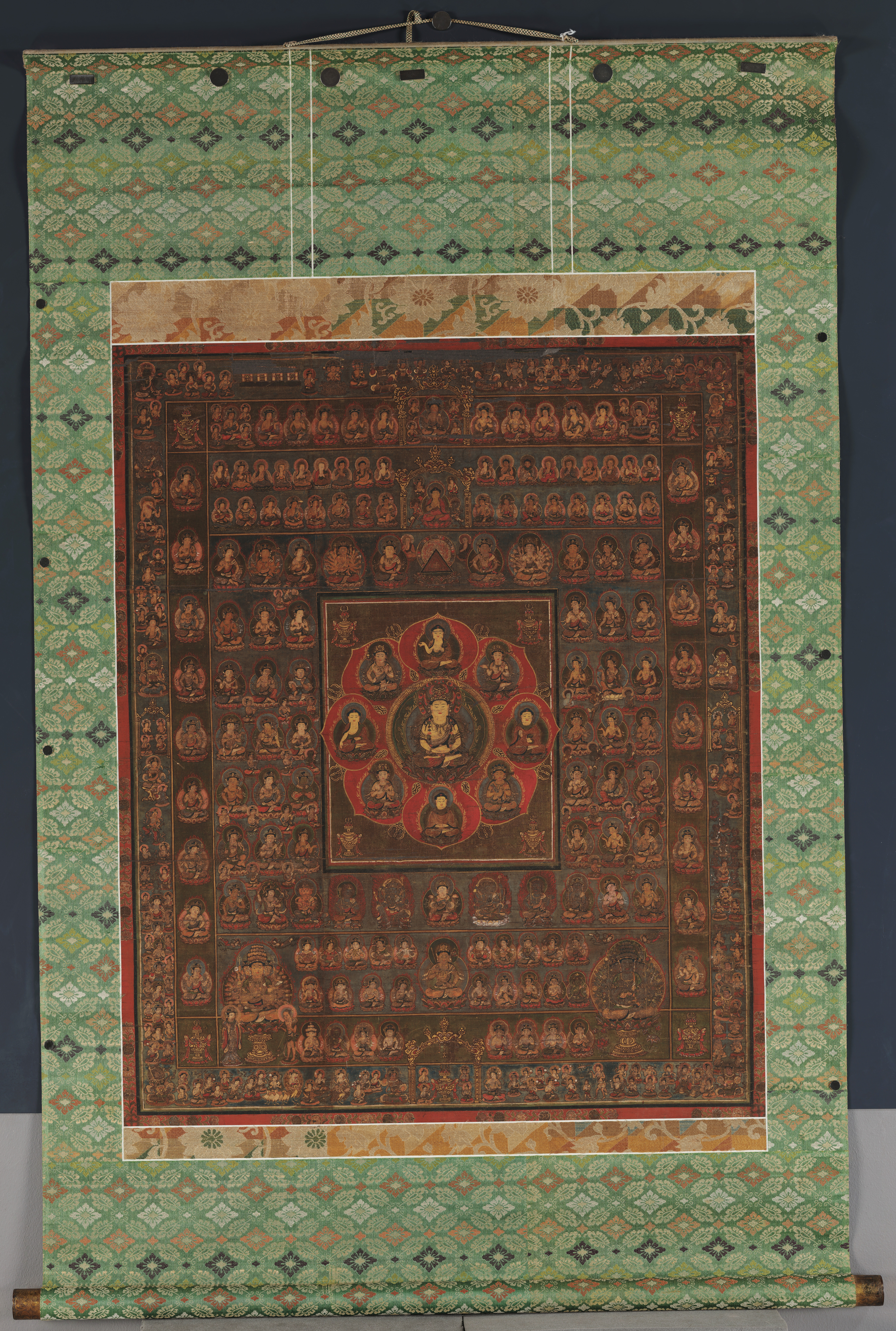
Womb World from Mandala of the Two Worlds (Kongōkai Taizōkai mandara). Hanging scroll, textile. Japan, 15th century.

The Womb Realm (Sanskrit: garbhakoṣadhātu, Traditional Chinese: 胎蔵界; Pinyin: Tāizāngjiè; Rōmaji: taizōkai) represents the principle of the Buddha's Great Compassion (Maha Karuṇā). It embodies the generative, protective and nurturing aspect of Mahāvairocana Buddha as the source of all phenomena and enlightenment, which is like a mother's womb (garbha).

The Womb Realm Mandala, also called the “Mandala generated from the womb of great compassion” (Mahākaruṇā garbodhbhava) is based on the Mahavairocana Sutra. The name of the mandala derives from chapter 2 of the sutra, where it is said that the buddha Mahāvairocana revealed the mandala's secret teachings to his disciple Vajrasattva from his "womb of compassion". In other translations, the term Matrix Realm or Matrix Mandala is used.

According to Kiyota, the core theme of the Mahavairocana Sutra is found in the following quotation from the sutra: "bodhicitta is the cause, compassion its roots and skill-in-means the ultimate." Bodhicitta here is the ultimate enlightened mind of the Dharmakāya, compassion is associated with the samboghakaya and skillful means with the nirmāṇakāya. Each of these three are mapped into the various halls of the mandala as follows: the outermost court represents nirmanakaya; the central hall, Vajrapani, Avalokitesvara, All-knowledge and Vidyadhara halls are the Dharmakaya, and the remaining halls are the samboghakaya. As Kiyota writes "In short, this mandala shows that truth, cognized by wisdom and hence ultimately identical with wisdom, is not simply a fixed and frozen conceptual category, but a dynamic one capable of infiltrating the empirical world and that improvising skill-in-means is the norm to verify bodhicitta within the person".

Another central symbol of this mandala is the eight petaled lotus (appearing at the center and as the seat of all the figures in the mandala), which also symbolizes the unity of Great Compassion, and skillful means with Buddhahood, since the lotus plant blooms and produces seeds at the same time.

The womb realm is also the metaphysical space inhabited by the Five Buddhas and other deities representing the unity of Emptiness and Great Compassion, such as Avalokitesvara, Ksitigarbha, Acala Vidyaraja, Vaisravana, Saraswati, and Mahakala.

=== Structure ===
The mandala is organized into twelve halls or assemblies (院), radiating from a central eight petaled lotus. The central figure is Mahāvairocana Tathagata, the cosmic Buddha whose body is the entire cosmos. He is depicted at the center on a lotus throne, surrounded by Buddhas and bodhisattvas, each representing various aspects like compassion and wisdom. The various assemblies are populated by numerous Buddhist deities who personify particular virtues and Dharma principles. The Womb Realm symbolizes the immanent presence of enlightenment within all beings, and the compassionate activities of the Buddhas that lead beings to awakening.

The following is a basic outline of the main halls or quarters of the Womb Realm Mandala:

Outside Vajra Hall

Hall of Mañjuśrī
Hall of Kṣitigarbha	Hall of Śākyamuni			Hall of Sarvanīvaraṇaviṣkambhin
Hall of Kṣitigarbha	Lotus Hall of Avalokiteśvara	Hall of Universal Knowledge	Hall of Vajrapāṇi	Hall of Sarvanīvaraṇaviṣkambhin
Hall of Kṣitigarbha	Lotus Hall of Avalokiteśvara	Central Eight Petal Lotus Hall	Hall of Vajrapāṇi	Hall of Sarvanīvaraṇaviṣkambhin
Hall of Kṣitigarbha	Lotus Hall of Avalokiteśvara	Wisdom Holders (Vidyādhara) Hall	Hall of Vajrapāṇi	Hall of Sarvanīvaraṇaviṣkambhin
Hall of Kṣitigarbha	Hall of Ākāśagarbha			Hall of Sarvanīvaraṇaviṣkambhin
Susiddhi Hall

==== Central Eight Petal Hall ====
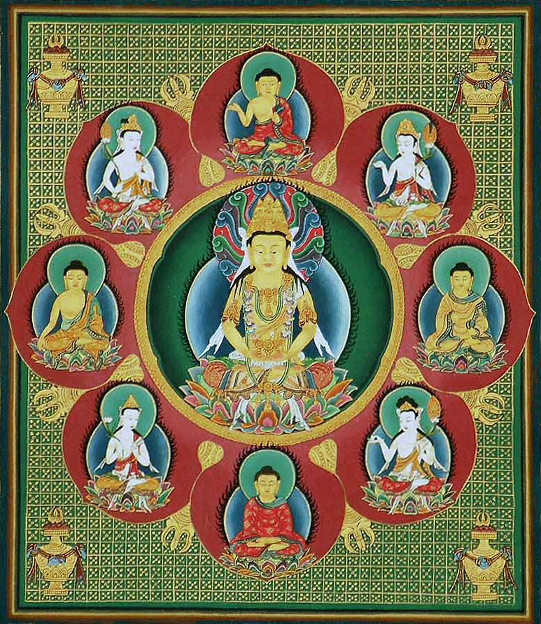
The central eight petal hall with Vairocana in center surrounded by (clockwise from top): Ratnasambhava, Samantabhadra, Saṅkusumitarāja, Manjushri, Amitābha, Avalokiteśvara, Amoghasiddhi and Maitreya).

In the central eight petalled lotus is red, symbolizing compassion and the human heart. This points to the Mantrayana belief that Buddhahood is present within this very body. Mahāvairocana is depicted in regal attire wearing a jewelled crown in the center of an eight-petaled lotus. Four Buddhas, representing the four directions, are depicted directly above, below, left, and right of Vairocana.

The Buddha of the East and of non-duality, Ratnaketu/Ratnasambhava, is illustrated on the top, the Buddha of the South and of wisdom, Saṅkusumitarāja to the right, the Buddha of the West and of compassion, Amitabha, to the bottom, and the Buddha of the North and of skillful means, Divyadundubhimeganirghoṣa (Amoghasiddhi), to the Left.

The eight petals also symbolize the eight consciousnesses, which are also non-dual with the four wisdoms of Buddhahood (symbolized by the four vajras between the petals). The four treasure vases in the corners of this hall are the enlightened mind, wisdom, compassion and skillful means of Vairocana Buddha. These four powers are also associated with the four bodhisattvas, Samantabhadra, Manjushri, Guanyin, and Maitreya, which are appear between the Buddhas in the other four petals of the red lotus.

Vajras are illustrated between the petals of nine deities and symbolize the knowledge or wisdom (jñana) that crush illusions.

Four vases containing a lotus and a three-pronged Vajra, are placed at the corners of the Center Hall. The hall is marked off by a five-colored boundary path with each color referring to one of the five buddhas, knowledges, directions, roots, conversions, syllables, elements, and forms.

==== Other halls ====
Encircling the Central Platform Eight-Petal Court are various courts or halls. Surrounding all of these, on the outermost perimeter, is placed the Outer Vajra Division Court, also called the Outermost Court. This arrangement suggests a movement outward from the inner to the outer realms, expressing the process wherein Mahāvairocana's abstract wisdom is applied in practice within the phenomenal world.

Moreover, one can see the Womb Realm Mandala as divided into three blocks: central, right, and left. The central area of the diagram represents the world of Mahāvairocana’s enlightenment. To the viewer’s left (southern direction) is the Lotus Division Court (蓮華部院, also called the Avalokiteśvara Court), centered on the principal deity Avalokiteśvara, and to the viewer’s right (northern direction) is the Vajra Division Court (金剛手院, also called the Vajra Division Court or Sattva Court 薩埵院), centered on Vajrapani. The Lotus Division Court is regarded as representing the "compassion" of the Tathāgata, while the Vajra Division Court represents the "wisdom" of the Tathāgata.

== Vajra Realm Mandala ==
Kue Taizōkai Mandala, Hanging scroll. Japan, 15th century.

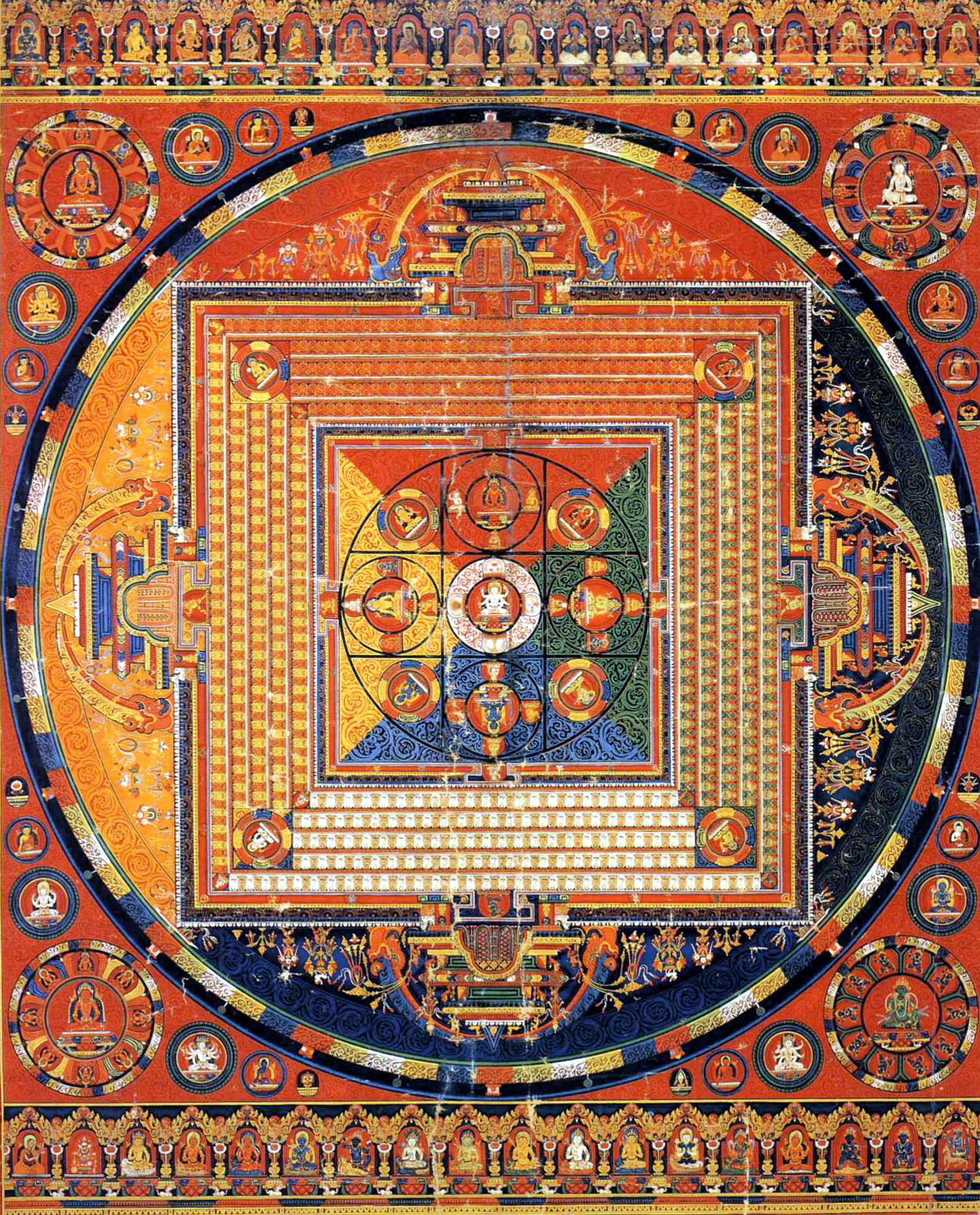
Tibetan version of the Vajradhatu mandala, which shows a very different arrangement than the East Asian form

The Vajra Realm (Sanskrit: vajradhātu, Traditional Chinese: 金剛界; pinyin: Jīngāngjiè; rōmaji: Kongōkai) represents the universal all-pervasive Wisdom of the Buddha. The Vajra Realm symbolizes the universe as pervaded and infused by the indestructible, unchanging and omniscient knowledge (jñana) of Mahāvairocana which directly realizes the ultimate truth. This wisdom is none other than Buddhahood itself, as well as buddha-nature.

The key symbol evoked in this mandala is the Vajra (a mythic weapon made of an indestructible substance comparable to adamant), which symbolizes the power and immutability of wisdom. The Vajradhātu mandala is commonly translated as "Diamond Realm" mandala.

The Vajra Realm Mandala and its nine panels are mostly based on various mandalas described in an esoteric Buddhist sutra called the Vajrasekhara Sutra (Adamantine Peak), though one of the panels is also based on the Prajñaparamita-naya sutra. There are various versions of the Vajra Realm mandala. The Shingon school uses the nine panel Kue Mandala (九会曼荼羅). Meanwhile, some lineages of the Tendai school alternatively use the 37 deity Kongōkai Hachijūisson Mandala (金剛界八十一尊曼荼羅, also known as the Vajradhatu mahamandala) instead, which is also derived from the Vajrasekhara Sutra and corresponds to the Jōjin-e central panel of the nine panel Kue Mandala.

=== Structure ===
The structure of the Kue version of the Vajra Realm Mandala is organized into nine main sections, collectively called the "Nine Assemblies" (九會曼荼羅):

5. Shiin-e assembly depicting Mahāvairocana surrounded by the four vajra bodhisattvas and eight symbols. Each figure holds a mudra representing a specific Buddha wisdom.	6. One Mudra Hall - depicts only Mahāvairocana, with hands in the Wisdom Fist Mudra. This is the Dharmakāya realm.	7. Rishu-e assembly, can contain from 9 to 17 deities centered around Kongōsatta Bodhisattva (Vajrasattva) along with the four Vajra bodhisattvas. This hall represents bodhicitta (Vajrasattva) in the world of delusions (symbolized by the surrounding bodhisattvas).
4. Kuyō-e (Mandala of Offering), depicting up to 73 deities sitting on lotuses holding symbolic objects each representing a specific method of awakening.	1. Jōjin-e assembly or Karma hall, with Mahāvairocana in the center, surrounded by the other four of the Five Wisdom Buddhas (五智如來)	8. Gōzanze-e (Hall of the wrathful deity Trailokyavijaya, Vanquisher of Triple World) Mandala with Mahāvairocana in center surrounded by 16 bodhisattvas all forming the Mudra of Subjugation and appearing in wrathful forms. Up to 77 deities may appear on this panel.
3. Misai-e (Mandala of Imperceptibility) with the main 37 deities of the Vajra-realm. It represents the Buddha wisdom transmitted in words.	2. Samaya-e assembly in which up to 73 deities are depicted by symbolic objects (Sanmayagō 三昧耶形). It symbolizes skillful means.	9. Gōzanze Sanmaya-e (Vanquisher of the Triple World Samaya forms) depicts Trailokyavijaya and other wrathful deities in samaya form, holding various symbols.

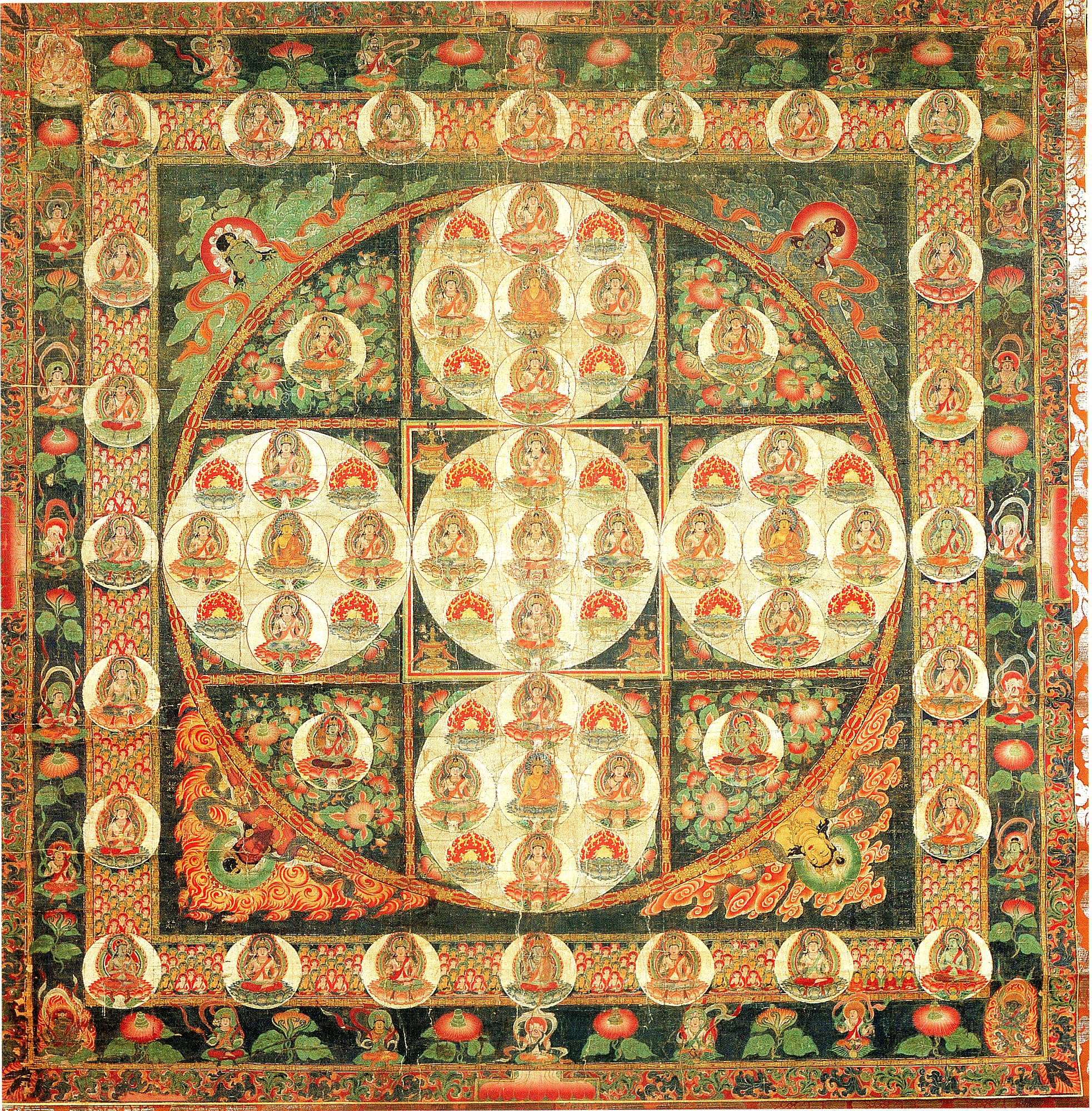
An alternative form of the Kongōkai mandala, called the Hachijūisson Mandala 金剛界八十一尊曼荼羅, which is the main Vajra mandala in Tendai Esotericism (Taimitsu). This mandala is based on the Karma mandala, the central hall of the nine hall Kue mandala.

This mandala depicts Buddhahood as a dynamic and always changing process. The nine halls present a kind of path structure starting from the center hall (1) and moving down and to the left (as the chart above is numbered). This movement from the center outwards represents the path of enlightening others, while following the mandala from hall number 9 inwards represents the path of enlightening oneself.

The central hall or Karma hall depicts the mind. This hall consists of five small circles (Vimoksa circles) within a larger circle (Vajra circle), which in turn is within three squares. The Vajra circle symbolizes acquired liberation arising from cultivation. The four Buddhas in the four circles in the Vajra circle (Aksobhya, Ratnasambhava, Amitayus and Amogasiddhi) symbolize the four wisdoms taught in Yogacara and the central Buddha (Mahavairocana) is the Dharmakaya.

The traditional Shingon interpretation of the nine halls maintains that the initial four halls correspond to the four fundamental characteristics of Mahāvairocana: (1) wisdom (jñāna), (2) vow or commitment (samaya), (3) the articulation of truth through language (the Dharma as expressed verbally), and (4) skillful means (upāya). The fifth hall serves to integrate these four qualities into a single unity, thus representing a comprehensive gathering of Mahāvairocana’s attributes, whereas the first four halls present them in particular. The sixth hall further synthesizes these attributes by embodying them through a mudrā. The concepts of "the four halls unified into one" (fifth hall) and "the four wisdoms unified into one" (sixth hall) serve within Shingon doctrinal thought to illustrate that all phenomena arise from Mahāvairocana and are fundamentally grounded in him. The seventh hall symbolizes the arousing of bodhicitta (the aspiration for awakening), the eighth signifies the enlightenment of sentient beings, and the ninth hall represents the attainment of self-enlightenment.

=== In China ===
In Chinese Buddhism, the Vajra Realm Mandala is also associated with the esoteric Yujia Yankou ritual (瑜伽焰口), which is conducted to facilitate the physical and spiritual nourishment of all sentient beings in saṃsāra. Part of the ritual involves the performing ritual master wearing a Vairocana crown which is adorned with images of the Five Tathāgatas. The textual tradition for this part of the ritual asserts that the thirty-seven deities which make up the Vajra Realm Mandala are installed in the crown and that these deities confer their blessings and powers on the ritual master during the performance of the ritual.

== In Tendai esotericism ==
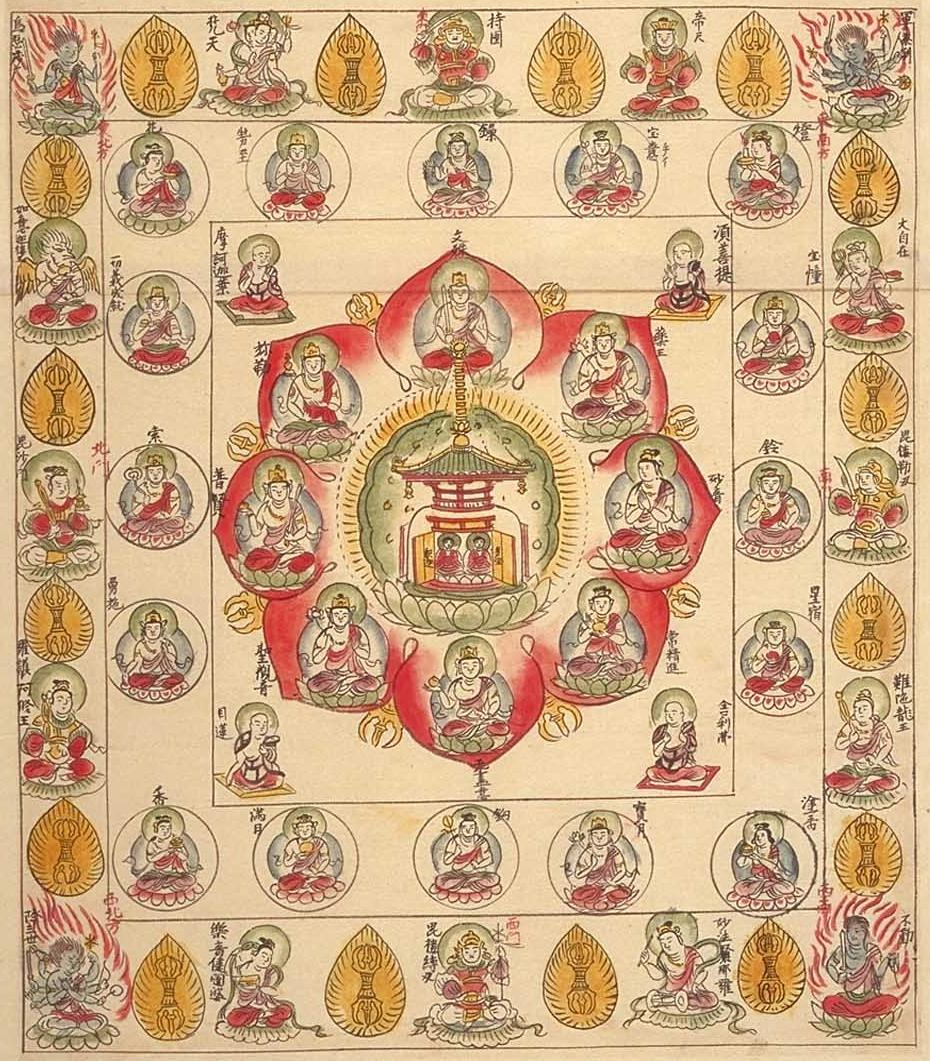
Lotus Sutra Mandala used in esoteric Lotus Sutra Rites (Hokkekyō-Hō), c. late Heian period.

The Tendai school also developed its own tradition of esoteric practices, termed Taimitsu (台密), and similarly revered the Two Mandalas. However, Tendai integrated them within a broader doctrinal framework based on the Tiantai thought of Zhiyi and Zhanran, emphasizing their ultimate identity with the Lotus Sūtra's teaching of universal Buddhahood and threefold truth of Tiantai. Tendai esotericism sees the Lotus Sutra itself as an esoteric scripture on the same level as the two esoteric sutras. Furthermore, Tendai esotericism also relies on another key esoteric text, the Susiddhikāra Sūtra (Soshitsujikara).

In Tendai, the Two Mandalas are seen as expressions of the same ultimate reality expounded in the Lotus Sūtra, and they are utilized in various meditative and ritual contexts. Over time, these mandalas were adopted into a unique form of Lotus Esotericism (Hokke Mikkyō), which was based on earlier Chinese sources and on a unique Tendai Lotus Sutra Maṇḍala. A unique element of Tendai esotericism is the concept of unifying the dual-realm maṇḍalas (and the teachings of their respective tantric scriptures) through a third element which was associated with the Susiddhikara sūtra. This interpretation was also understood through the Tendai doctrine of the three truths. The third element of susiddhi (perfect realization) was considered to be like the third truth of the middle, the non-dual unity of the reality of the dual-world mandalas. Since the Susiddhikara sūtra did not teach a specific mandala, the Lotus mandala was often used to represent this third esoteric truth.

The Tendai Lotus Sutra Maṇḍala (Hokkekyo mandara 法華経曼荼羅) features an eight-petaled lotus design adapted from the Womb realm maṇḍala. Likewise, the maṇḍala's structure, which arranges deities hierarchically around a central focus, draws on the dual-realm maṇḍalas. In the Lotus mandala, the stūpa represents the Dharma-body (dharmakāya), Prabhūtaratna Buddha corresponds to the Retribution body (sambhogakāya), and Śākyamuni aligns with the Manifestation body (nirmanakāya). The central court is identified with Dainichi of the Vajradhātu Maṇḍala, while the eight bodhisattvas correspond to the Eight Worthies of the Garbhadhātu Maṇḍala's eight-petaled lotus. In this interpretation, Śākyamuni is associated with Dainichi of the Garbhadhātu, Prabhūtaratna with Dainichi of the Vajradhātu, and the stūpa itself symbolizes the principle of susiddhi, representing a synthesis including all elements of both mandalas.

== See also ==
- Dhatu
- Mudra
- Mandala
- Mantra
- Dharmadhatu

== Sources ==
- Tanaka, Kimiaki (2018). An Illustrated History of the Mandala: From Its Genesis to the Kalacakratantra, Simon and Schuster.
- Grotenhuis, Elizabeth Ten (1999). Japanese mandalas: representations of sacred geography, Honolulu: University of Hawai'i Press, pp. 33-57
- Orzech, Charles D; Sorensen, Henrik Hjort; Payne, Richard Karl (2011). Esoteric Buddhism and the tantras in East Asia. Leiden; Boston: Brill. doi:10.1163/ej.9789004184916.i-1200. ISBN 978-90-04-20401-0. OCLC 731667667.
- Yamasaki, Taiko (1988). Shingon: Japanese Esoteric Buddhism, Boston/London: Shambala Publications.
