= Bījamantra =

Monosyllabic mantras in Indian religions

A bijamantra (Sanskrit: बीजमन्त्र, romanized: bījamantra, lit. 'seed-mantra', in modern schwa-deleted Indo-Aryan languages: beej mantra), or a bijakṣara ("seed-syllable"), is a monosyllabic mantra believed to contain the essence of a given deity. They are found in Tantric Hinduism and in Esoteric Buddhism (Vajrayana / Mantrayana).

A bijamantra is ritually uttered for the invocation of a deity. It is considered the true name of the deity as well as a manifestation of the deity in sonic form. It is also found in religious art, often standing for a specific deity. A bījamantra can be regarded to be a mystic sound made of the first few characters of a given deity's name, the chanting of which is regarded to allow an adherent to achieve a state of spiritual sanctity. These mantras are also associated with the chakras of the body.

The Romanian scholar Mircea Eliade stated that an adherent who chants the semantically meaningless bījamantra "appropriates its ontological essence, concretely and directly assimilates with the god".

== Hindu bijamantras ==
A few of the major bijamantras in Hinduism include:

Devanagari	Transliteration	Deity
औं/ॐ	auṃ	Parabrahma
श्रीं	śrīṃ	Lakshmi
लक्ष्मीः	lakṣmīḥ	Mahalakshmi
त्व्म्श्रीः	tvamśrīḥ	Mahasaraswati
कामलीः	kāmalīḥ	Mahakali
लक्ष्मीं	lakṣmī	Lakshmi
ऐं	aiṃ	Saraswati
क्लीं	klīm	Kali
क्रीं	krīṃ	Kali
ह्रौं	hrauṃ	Shiva
श्वीं	śvi	Shiva
गं	gaṃ	Ganesha
हूँ	hūṃ	Shiva
फट्	phaṭ	Destruction
ह्रीं	hrīṃ	Bhuvaneshvari
क्लीं	klīṃ	Shakti
दुं	duṃ	Durga
फ्रौं	phrauṃ	Hanuman
सौः	sauḥ	parābīja / Parashakti
दं	daṃ	Vishnu
द्रां	drāṃ	Dattatreya

=== Other notable bījamantras include ===
Devanagari	Transliteration	Deity
भ्रं	bhraṃ	Bhairava
धूं	dhūṃ	Dhumavati
ह्लीं	hlīṃ	Bagalamukhi
त्रीं	trīṃ	Tara
क्ष्रौं	kṣrauṃ	Narasimha
हं	haṃ	Akasha
यं	yaṃ	Vayu
रां	rāṃ	Agni
क्षं	kṣaṃ	Prithvi

== Buddhist bījākṣaras ==
Esoteric Buddhism contains numerous seed syllables with varying meanings. Depending on the tantra or on the tradition, they may represent different concepts, deities or forces.

The following are some common Buddhist bījākṣaras:

Sanskrit (IAST)	Meaning / use	Deity
A	The unborn, emptiness, Dharmakaya	Mahāvairocana, or other Adi-Buddha figures
āḥ	found in oṃ āḥ hūṃ	Amoghasiddhi, Karma Buddha Family
aṃ		Samantabhadra bodhisattva
bhai		Bhaiṣajyaguru
bhaḥ		Shakyamuni
dhīḥ	Prajñāpāramita, from the Vedic word meaning to think, or meditate	Mañjusri, Prajñaparamita Devi
hrīḥ	Compassion	Amitabha, Avalokiteshvara, Lotus Family
ha	Earth	Kṣitigarbha bodhisattva
hūṃ	Usually found at the end of a mantra, e.g. oṃ āḥ hūṃ and can also mean the wind element in certain contexts (e.g. in the a vi ra hūṃ khaṃ mantra)	Akshobhya
maiṃ		Maitreya, Vajra family
maṃ		Mañjusri
oṃ	Usually found at the beginning of Buddhist mantras, may signify the body, speech and mind of the Buddha in Tibetan Buddhism (when interpreted as A-u-m)	
tāṃ		Tara
traṃ		Ratnasambhava, Jewel Buddha Family
trāḥ	Ākāśa (Space)	Ākāśagarbha Bodhisattva
phaṭ	wrathful / subjugation of demons / forceful shout	
vaṃ,	for vac, the voice of the Buddha	Mahāvairocana (in the Vajradhatu mandala)
vi	the water element	
ra, raṃ	fire element (e.g. in the a vi ra hūṃ khaṃ mantra)	
khaṃ	the space element	
hāṃ		Acala (Fudo-Myoo)
