= Vajra Realm Mandala =

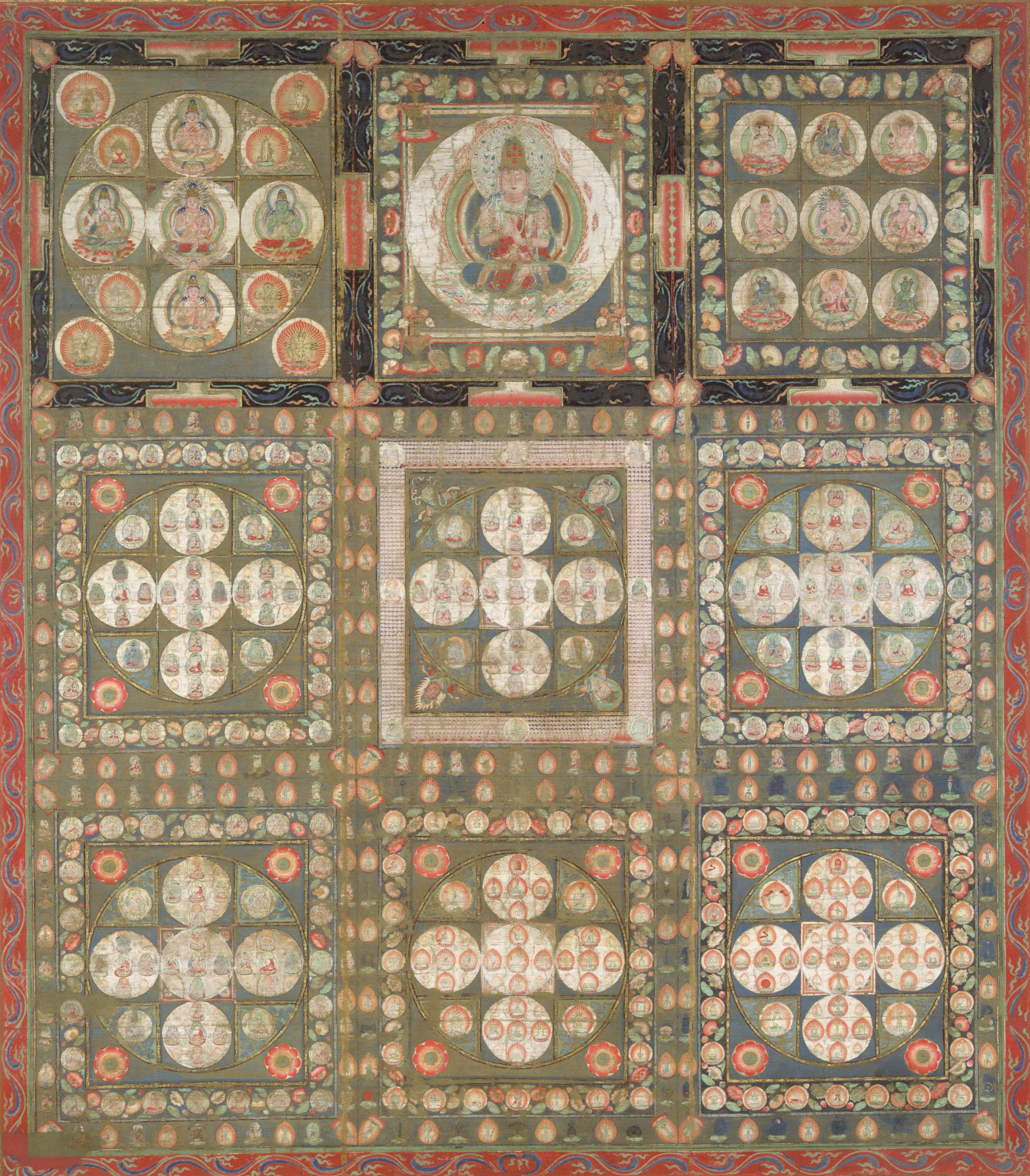
Vajra Realm Mandala

Vajra Realm Mandala

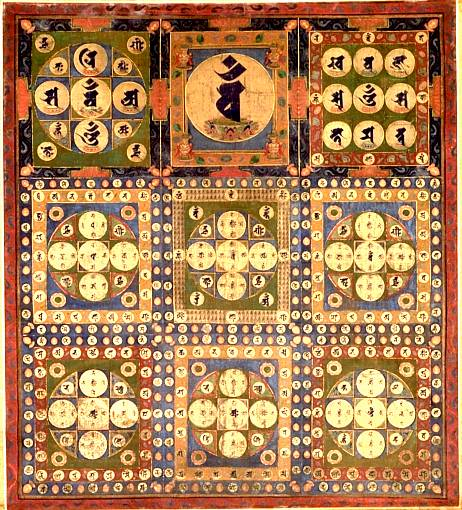
Vajra Realm Seed Mandala, in which all the Buddhas and Bodhisattvas are represented by Sanskrit letters.

Vajra Realm Mandala or Diamond Realm Mandala (Sanskrit: Vajra-dhātu Mandala, Traditional Chinese: 金剛界曼荼羅; rōmaji: Kongōkai mandara; Jyutping: Gam1 gong1 gaai3 maan6 tou4 lo4; pinyin: Jīngāngjiè màntúluó), is one of the two prominent mandalas in Chinese Esoteric Buddhism, as well as in the Shingon and Tendai traditions of Japanese Buddhism. The mandala is based on the Vajraśekhara Sūtra (Chinese: 金剛頂經; rōmaji: Kongōchō kyō; pinyin: Jīngāngdǐng jīng), one of the two fundamental scriptures in East Asian Esoteric Buddhism.

The teachings of Vajra Realm and Womb Realm are two major teachings of Chinese Esoteric Buddhism, as well as of the Shingon and Tendai traditions of Japanese Buddhism. Vajra Realm is associated with Transcendental Wisdom while Womb Realm is associated with Unconditional Compassion. Vajra Realm Mandala, together with Womb Realm Mandala, are called Mandala of the Two Realms.

The Vajra Realm Mandala is composed of nine Assemblies (square sections) and is also known as Nine-Assembly Mandala (Traditional Chinese: 九會曼荼羅; rōmaji: Kue mandara). The top of the mandala corresponds to the west, while its bottom, left and right correspond to the east, south and north respectively, therefore the mandala is also called West Mandala.

== Structure ==
Four Seals Assembly (四印會) (Shiin-e)	One Seal Assembly (一印會) (Ichiin-e)	Philosophy Assembly (理趣會) (Rishu-e)
Offering Assembly (供養會) (Kuyou-e)	Achievement of Body Assembly (成身會) (Joushin-e)	Conquering the Triple World Karma Assembly (降三世羯磨會) (Gouzanze-e)
Subtle Assembly (微細會) (Misai-e)	Samaya Assembly (三昧耶會) (Sanmaya-e)	Conquering the Triple World Samaya Assembly (降三世三昧耶會) (Gouzanze sanmaya-e)
