= Ratnasambhava =

One of the Five Meditation Buddhas

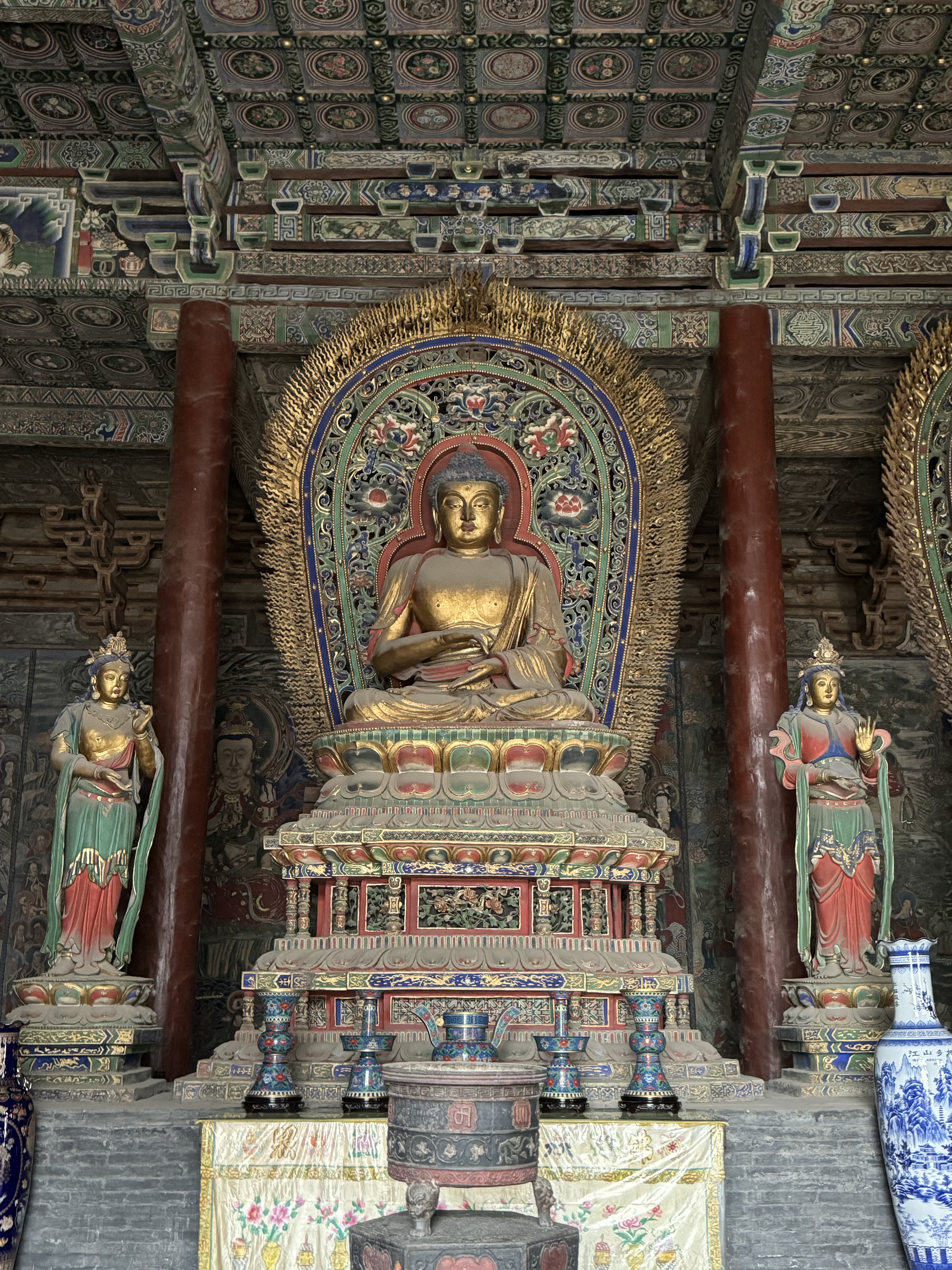
- Ming dynasty (1368–1644) statue of Ratnasambhava in Huayan Temple in Datong, Shanxi, China, one out of a set of statues of the Five Tathāgatas
- Sanskrit: रत्नसम्भव; Ratnasambhava
- Burmese: ရတနသမ္ဘဝ
- Chinese: (Traditional) 寶生如來 (Simplified) 宝生如来 (Pinyin: Bǎoshēng Rúlái)
- Japanese: 宝生如来(ほうしょうにょらい) (romaji: Hōshō Nyorai)
- Khmer: រតនសម្ភវៈ (ra-ta-na-som-pha-veak)
- Korean: 보생여래 (RR: Bosaeng Yeorae)
- Mongolian: ᠷᠠᠲᠨᠠᠰᠠᠮᠪᠠᠸᠠ᠂ ᠡᠷᠳᠡᠨᠢ ᠭᠠᠷᠬᠣ ᠶᠢᠨ ᠣᠷᠣᠨ᠂ ᠷᠢᠨᠴᠢᠨᠵᠦᠨᠡᠢ; Раднаасамбава, Эрдэнэ гарахын орон, Ринчинжунай; SASM/GNC: Radnasambawa, Erdeni garhu yin orun, Rincinjunai
- Tibetan: རིན་ཆེན་འབྱུང་གནས་ or རིན་ཆེན་འབྱུང་ལྡན་ Wylie: rin chen 'byung gnas THL: rin chen 'byung ldan
- Vietnamese: Bảo Sanh Như Lai

Information
- Venerated by: Mahāyāna, Vajrayana
- Attributes: Equality, Equanimity
- Shakti: Mamaki

Ratnasambhava (Sanskrit: रत्नसम्भव, lit. "Jewel-Born") is one of the Five Dhyani Buddhas (or "Five Meditation Buddhas") of Mahayana and Vajrayana or Tantric Buddhism. Ratnasambhava's mandalas and mantras focus on developing equanimity and equality and, in Vajrayana Buddhist thought is associated with the attempt to destroy greed and pride. His consort is Mamaki and his mount is a horse or a pair of lions.

== Textual History ==
The first documented mention of Ratnasambhava is found in the Suvarṇaprabhāsa Sūtra and in the Guhyasamāja Tantra (4th century CE), and he subsequently appears in a number of Vajrayana texts. The most elaborate account of him is to be found in the Pañcakara section of the Advayavajrasaṃgraha.

In the Śūraṅgama mantra (Chinese: 楞嚴咒; pinyin: Léngyán Zhòu) taught in the Śūraṅgama sutra (Chinese: 楞嚴經; pinyin: Léngyán Jīng), an especially influential dharani in the Chinese Chan tradition, Ratnasambhava is mentioned to be the host of the Jewel-creating Division in the South, one of the five major divisions which controls the vast demon armies of the five directions.

Ratnasambhava is also mentioned as one of the Buddhas worthy of praise in the Kṣitigarbha Bodhisattva Pūrvapraṇidhāna Sūtra, chapter 9:

Again in the past, immeasurable, incalculable kalpas ago, as many as the grains of sand in the Ganges River, there appeared in the world a Buddha bearing the title of Ratnasambhava Tathāgata. Any man or woman, hearing the Buddha's name and showing respect to him, will soon attain the stage of an Arhat.

== Characteristics ==
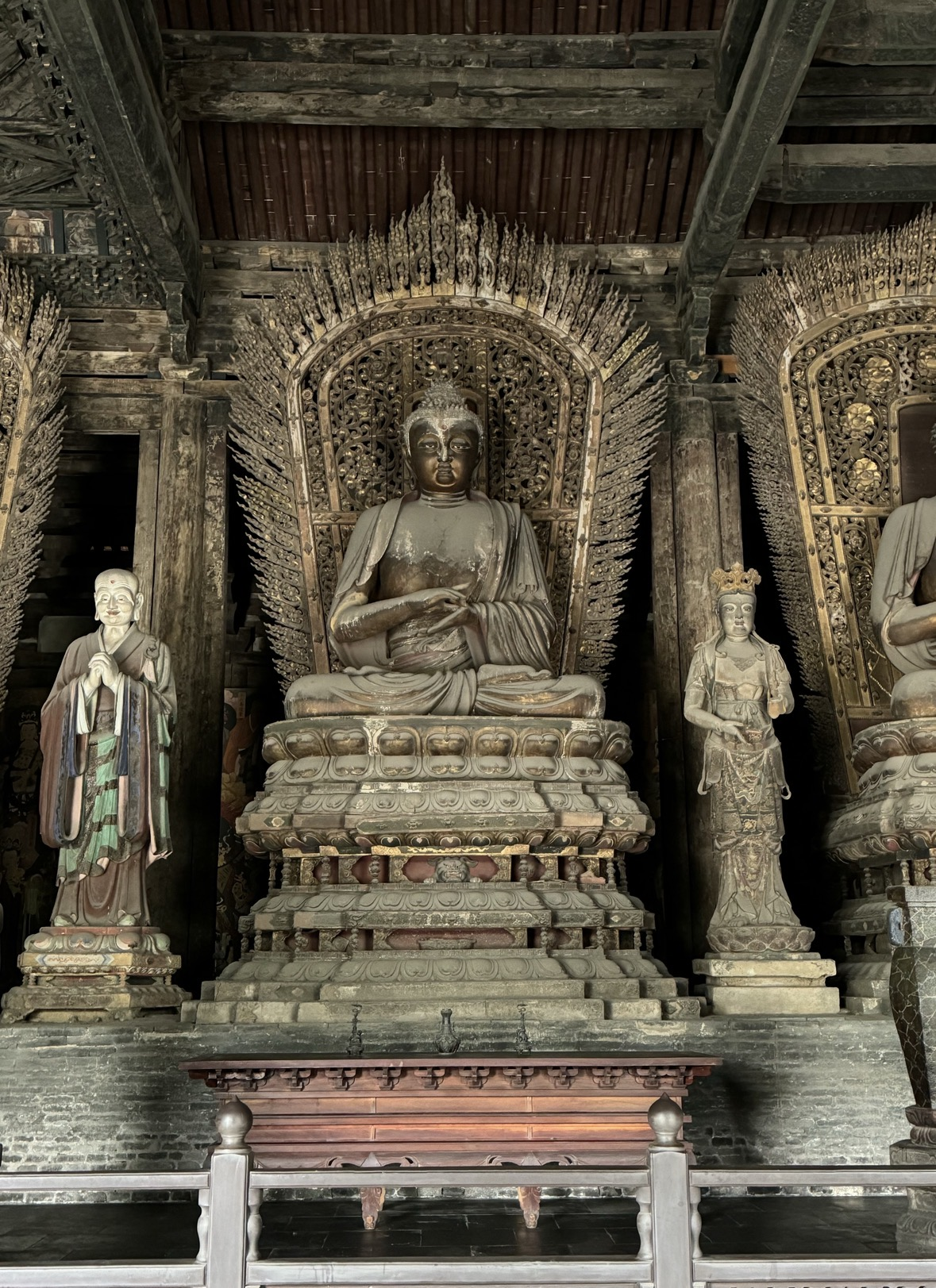
Jin Dynasty (1115–1234) statue of Ratnasambhava in Shanhua Temple in Datong, Shanxi, China, one out of a set of statues of the Five Tathāgatas

Ratnasaṃbhava is associated with the skandha of feeling or sensation and its relationship with consciousness. His activity in promoting Buddhism is enriching and increasing knowledge of Dharma. Ratnasambhava is associated with the jewel symbol, which corresponds with his family, Ratna or jewel. In artwork he is shown in the mudra of giving.

He is usually coloured yellow or gold. He is associated with the element earth, the heavenly quarter of the south and the season of spring. His cardinal direction is the south. His Buddha field is known as Śrimat.

In the Bardo Thodol, he is depicted in union with Mamaki and attended by the male bodhisattvas Ākāśagarbha and Samantabhadra and the female bodhisattvas Mala and Dhupa.

In Tibet, Vaiśravaṇa, also known as Jambhala and Kubera, is considered a worldly dharmapāla, and is often depicted as a member of the retinue of Ratnasambhava.

His wrathful manifestation is the Wisdom King Kuṇḍali.

== Notes ==
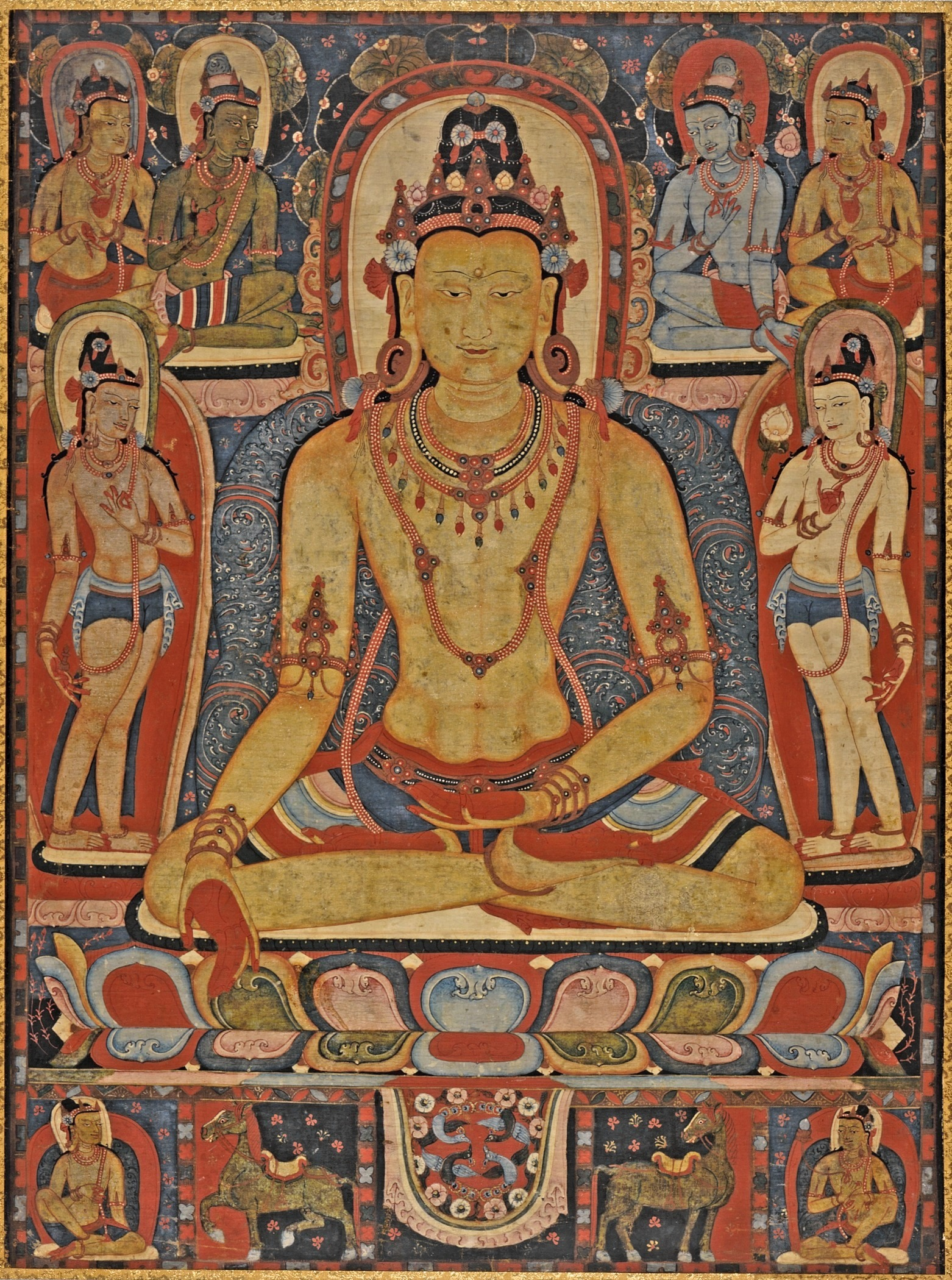
Ratnasambhava, around 1200, Los Angeles County Museum of Art

- Mythology of India: Myths of India, Sri Lanka and Tibet, Rachel Storm, Anness Publishing Limited, Editor Helen Sudell, Page 69, Column 1, Lines 9–18, Caption, Page 69, Column 4, Lines 1–4
- Five Dhyani Buddhas Table 1, Row 4, Columns 1–5, Table 2, Row 2, Columns 1–12
