= Amoghasiddhi =

Buddha of wisdom in East Asian Buddhism and Tibetan Buddhism

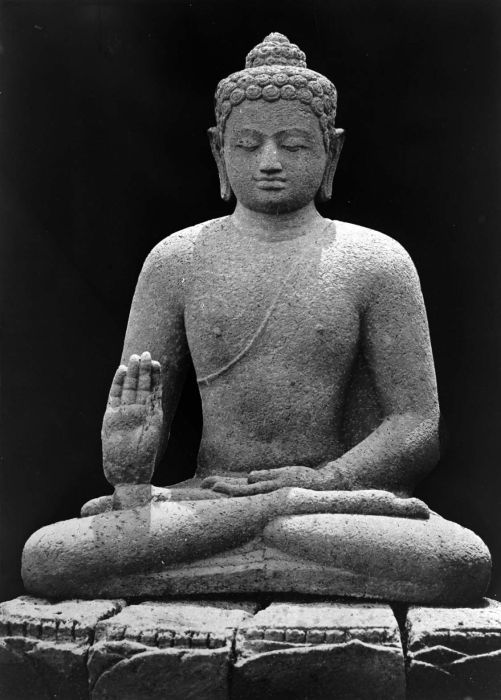
- Statue of Amogasiddha from Borobudur, Central Java, Indonesia
- Sanskrit: अमोघसिद्धि Amoghasiddhi
- Burmese: အမောဂသိဒ္ဓိ
- Chinese: 不空成就佛 (Pinyin: Bùkōngchéngjiù Fó)
- Japanese: 不空成就仏(ふくうじょうじゅぶつ) (romaji: Fukūjōju Butsu)
- Khmer: អមោឃសិទ្ធិ (UNGEGN: Âmoŭkhôsĕtthĭ)
- Korean: 불공성취불 (RR: Bulgongseongchwi Bol)
- Mongolian: ᠠᠮᠣᠭᠠᠰᠢᠳᠢ᠂ ᠲᠡᠭᠦᠰ ᠨᠥᠭᠴᠢᠭᠰᠡᠨ; Амгаасид, Төгс нөгчсөн (SASM/GNC: Amugasidi, Tegüs nögcigsen)
- Thai: พระอโมฆสิทธิพุทธะ; Phraamoksitthiphuttha
- Tibetan: དོན་ཡོད་གྲུབ་པ་ Wylie: don yod grub pa THL: dönyö drubpa
- Vietnamese: Bất Không Thành Tựu Phật

Information
- Venerated by: Mahāyāna, Vajrayāna

Amoghasiddhi (Devanagari: अमोघसिद्धि) is one of the Five Wisdom Buddhas of the Mahayana and Vajrayana tradition of Buddhism. He is associated with the accomplishment of the Buddhist path and of the destruction of the poison of envy. His name means Unfailing Accomplishment. His consort is Tara, meaning Liberator and his mounts are garudas. He belongs to the family of karma whose family symbol is the double vajra.

== Characteristics ==
Amoghasiddhi is associated with the conceptual (Skt: samskara) skandha or the conceptual mind (as opposed to the non-conceptual or sensational mind). His action towards the promotion of Buddhist paths is the pacification of evils. This is symbolised by Amoghasiddhi's symbol, the moon. He gestures in the mudra of fearlessness, symbolising his and his devotees' fearlessness towards the poisons or delusions.

He is usually coloured green in artwork and is associated with the air or wind element. His season is autumn and his heavenly quarter is the northern buddha-kṣetra called Prakuta.

In the Śūraṅgama mantra (Chinese: 楞嚴咒; pinyin: Léngyán Zhòu) taught in the Śūraṅgama sutra (Chinese: 楞嚴經; pinyin: Léngyán Jīng), an especially influential dharani in the Chinese Chan tradition, Amoghasiddhi is mentioned to be the host of the Karma Division in the North, one of the five major divisions which controls the vast demon armies of the five directions.

== Gallery ==
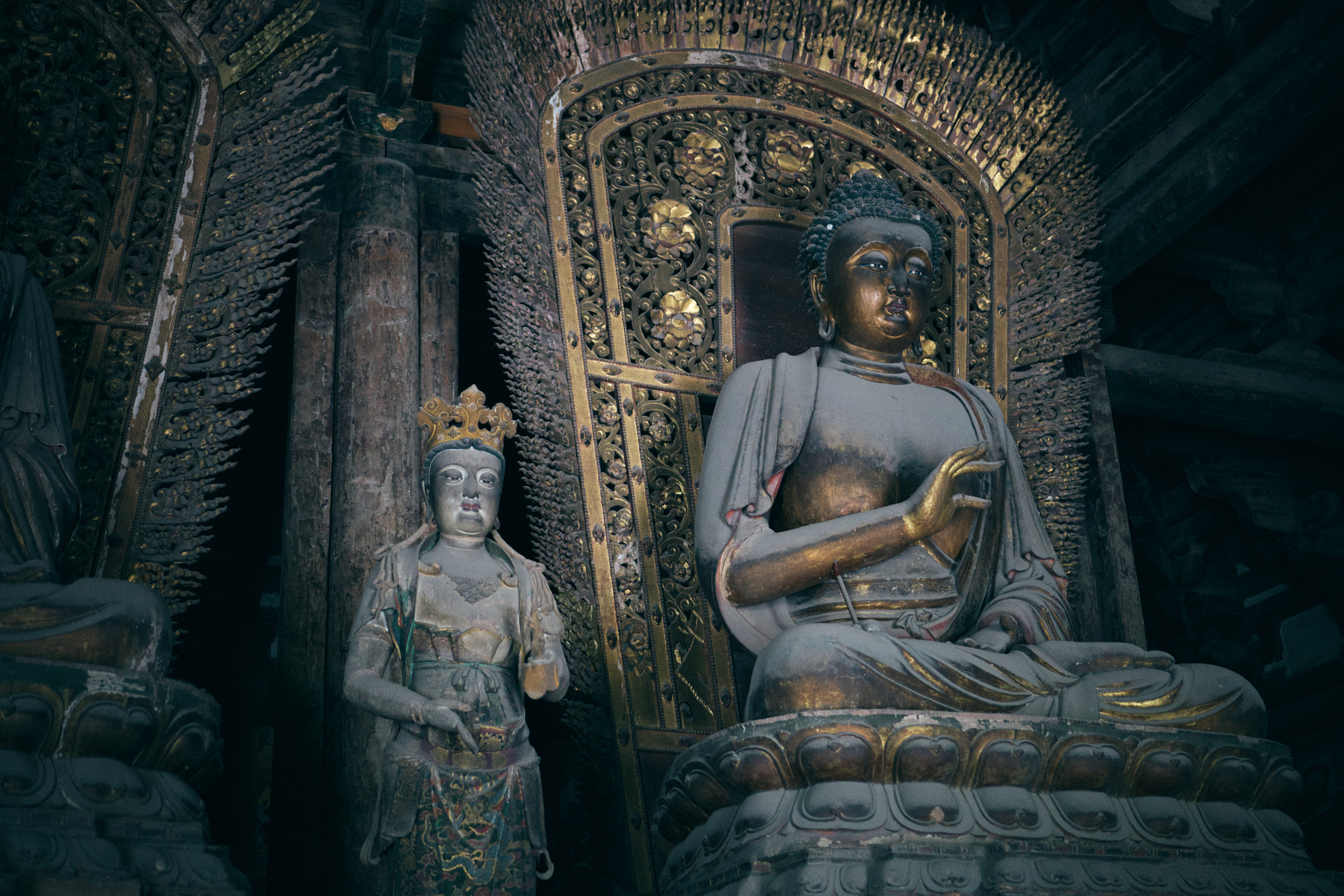
Jin dynasty (1115–1234) statue of Amoghasiddhi in Shanhua Temple in Datong, Shanxi, China, one out of a set of statues of the Five Tathagathas

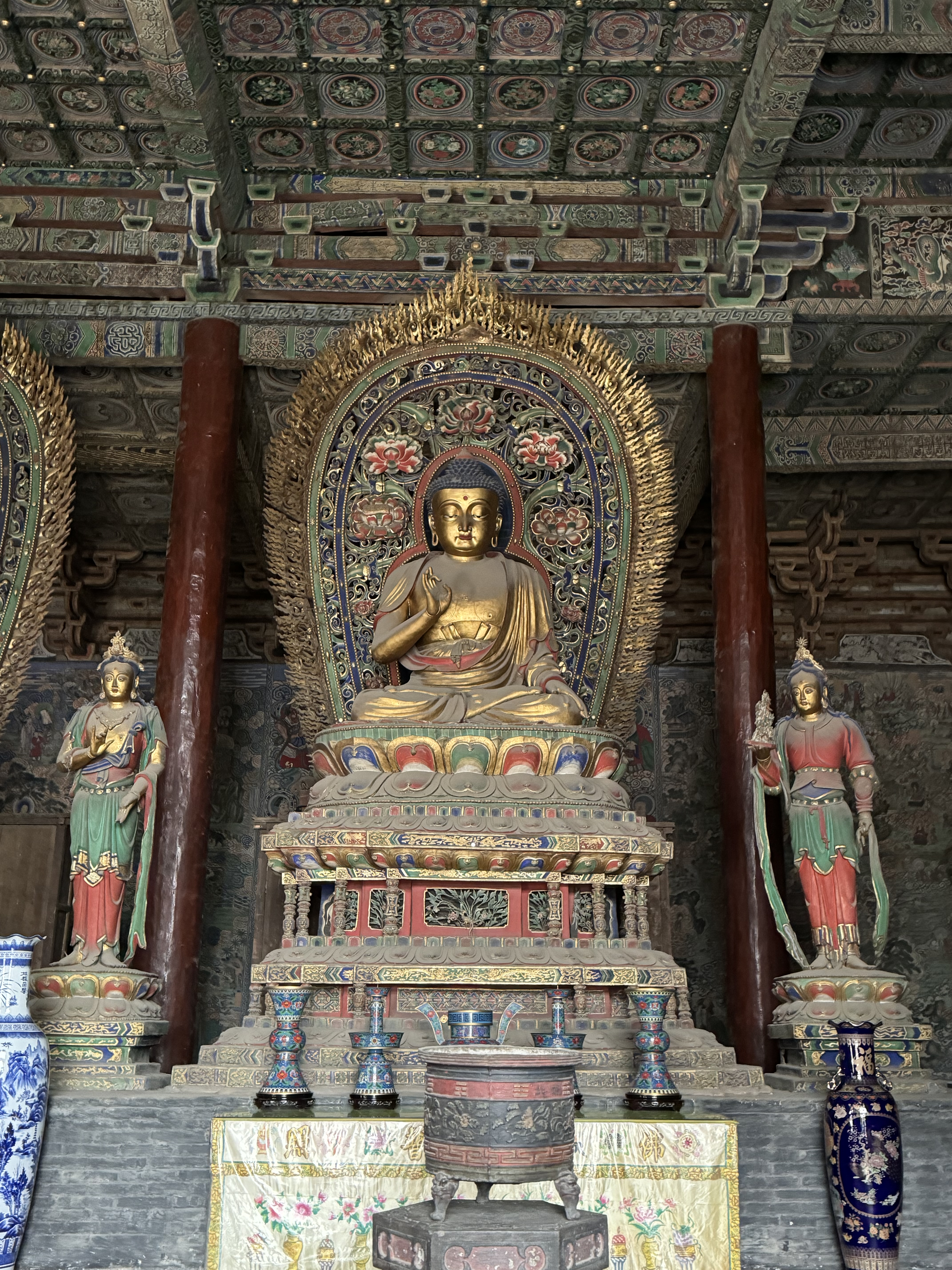
Ming dynasty (1368–1644) statue of Amoghasiddhi in Huayan Temple in Datong, Shanxi, China, one out of a set of statues of the Five Tathagathas

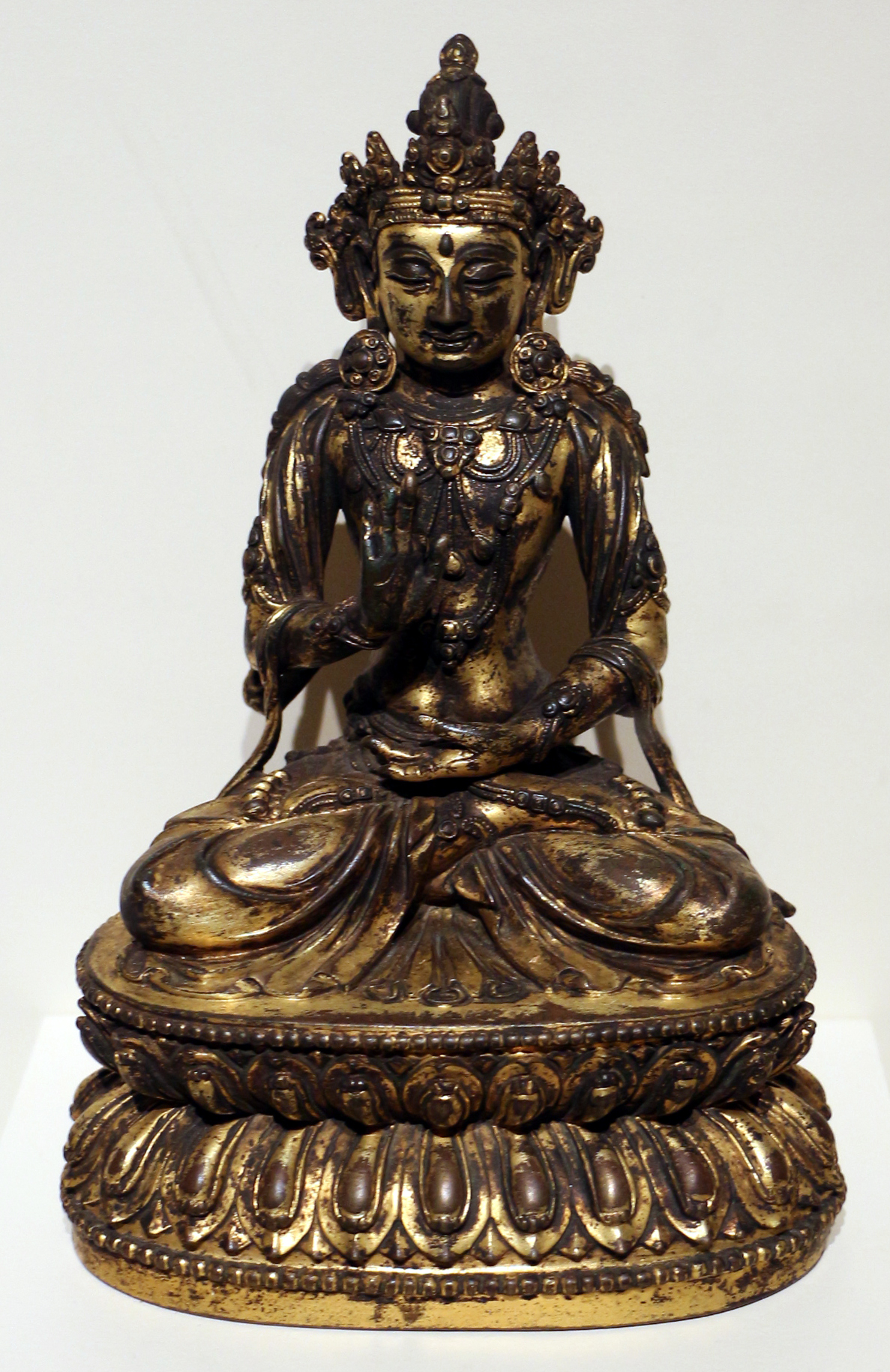
Ming dynasty figurine of Amoghasiddhi, made during the reign of the Yongle Emperor, early 1400s

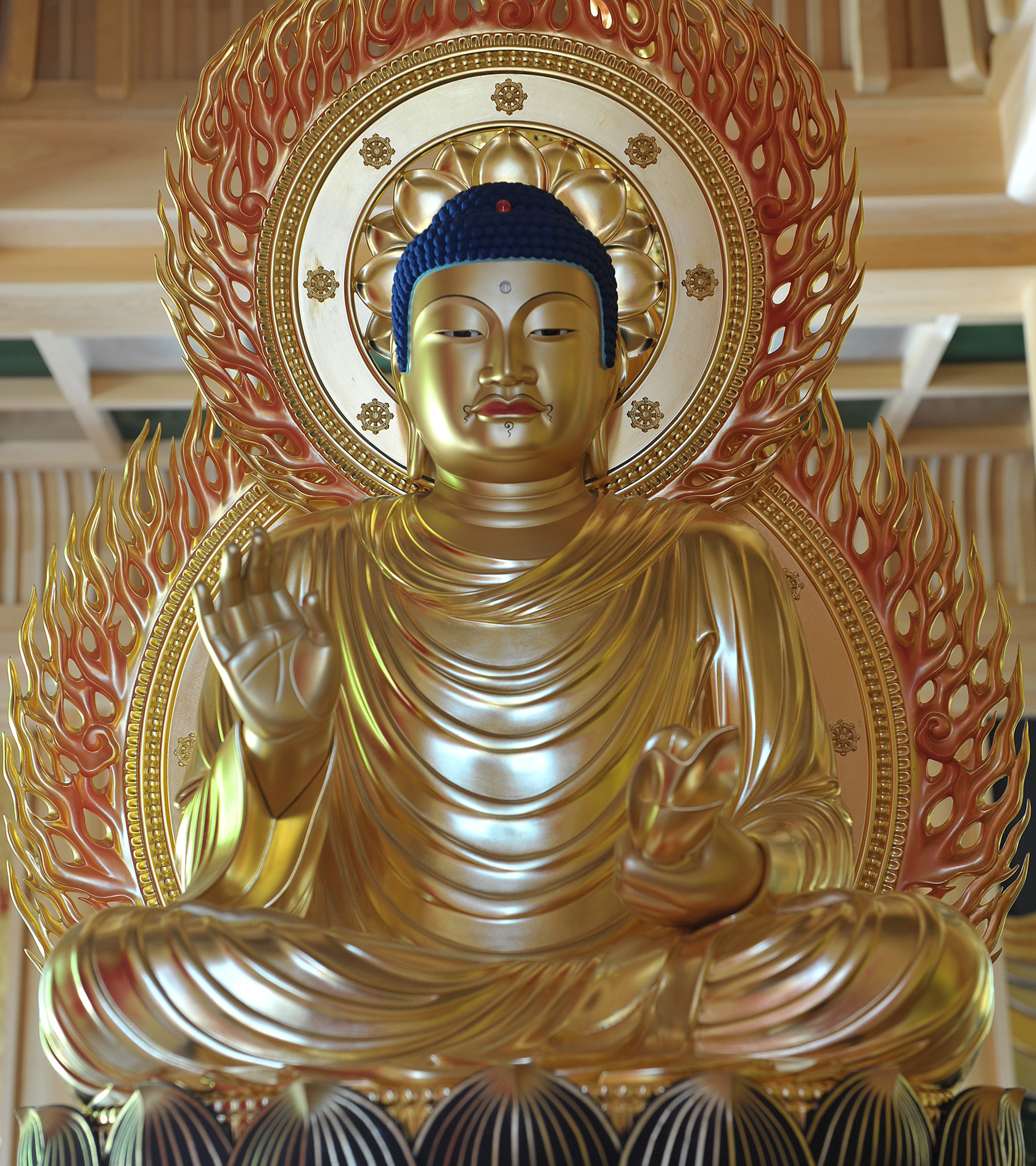
Modern statue of Amoghasiddhi in Renge-in Tanjō-ji, Kumamoto Prefecture, Japan.

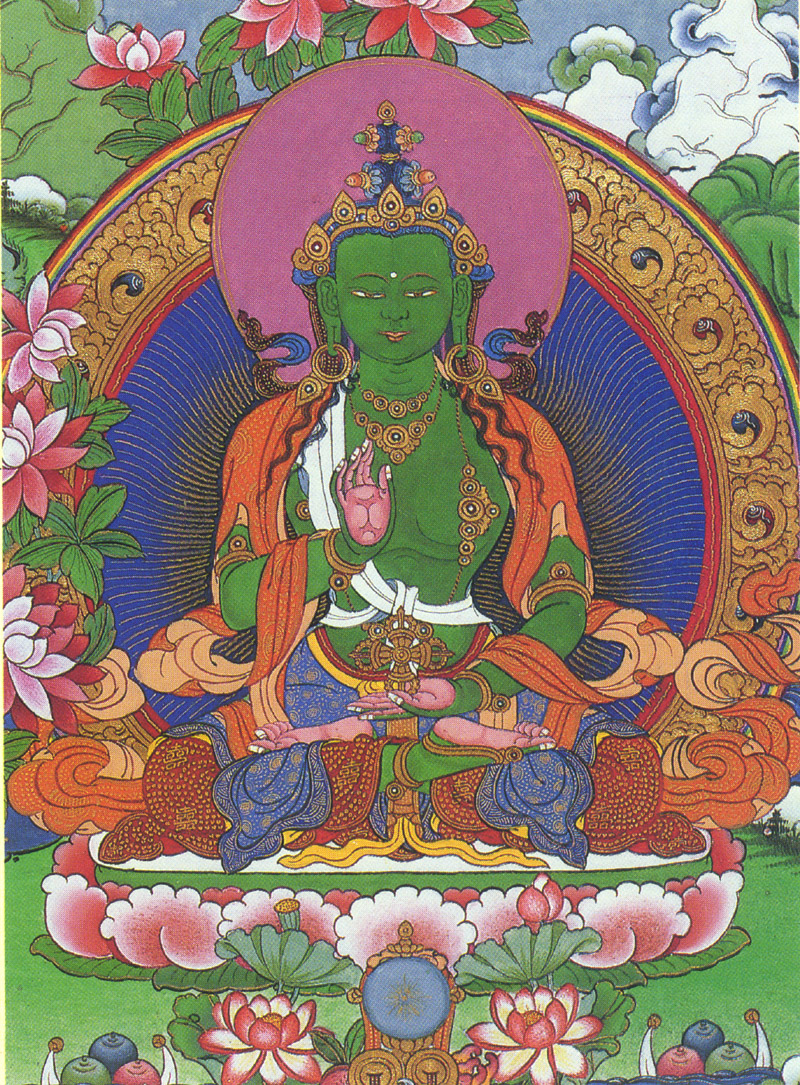
Amoghasiddhi, depicted with green skin

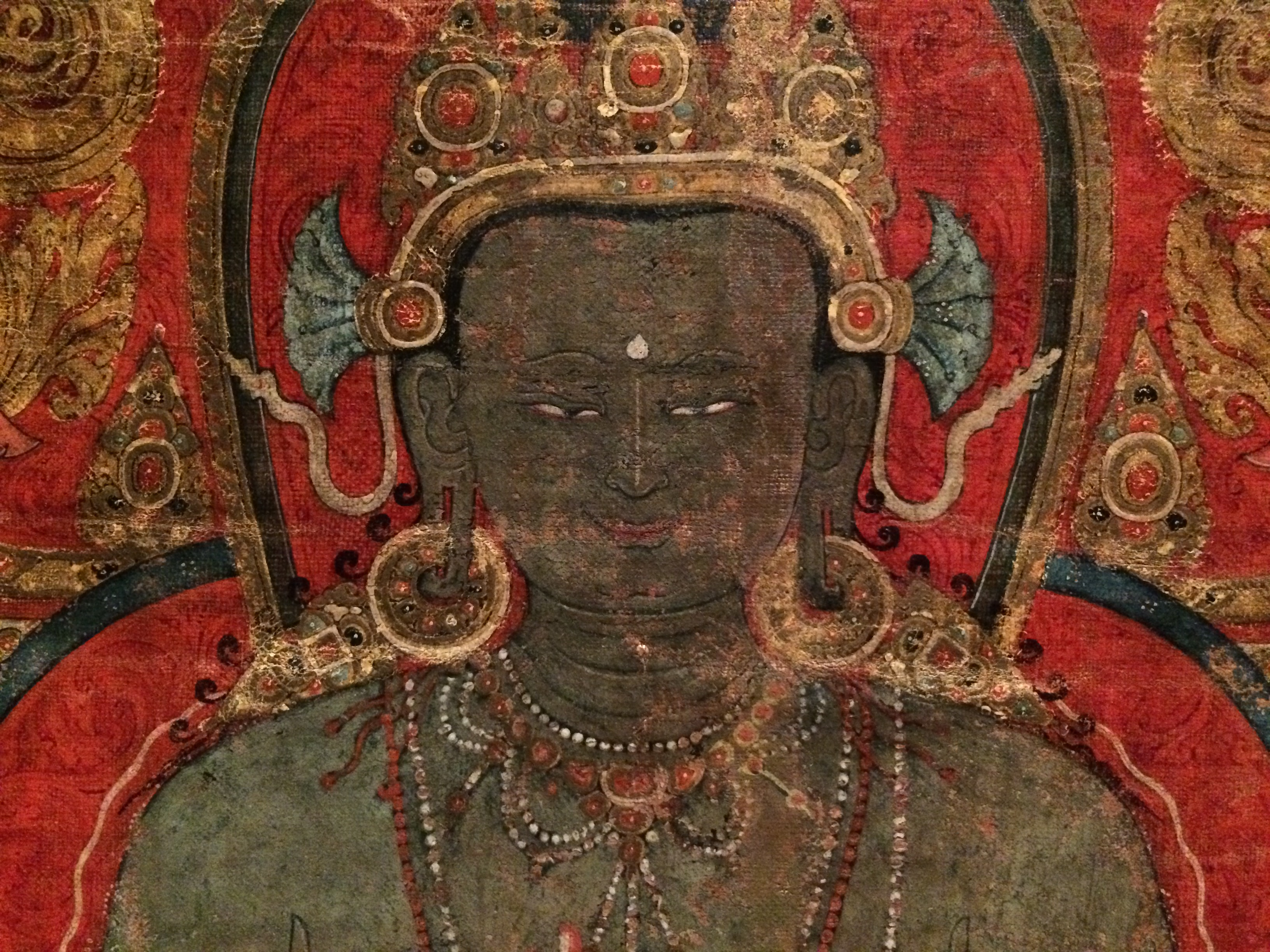
Close up view of Amoghasiddhi from a Tibetan painting, 1300–1400 CE

== See also ==
- Five Dhyani Buddhas
