= Rakta Yamari =

Tantric Buddhist meditational deity

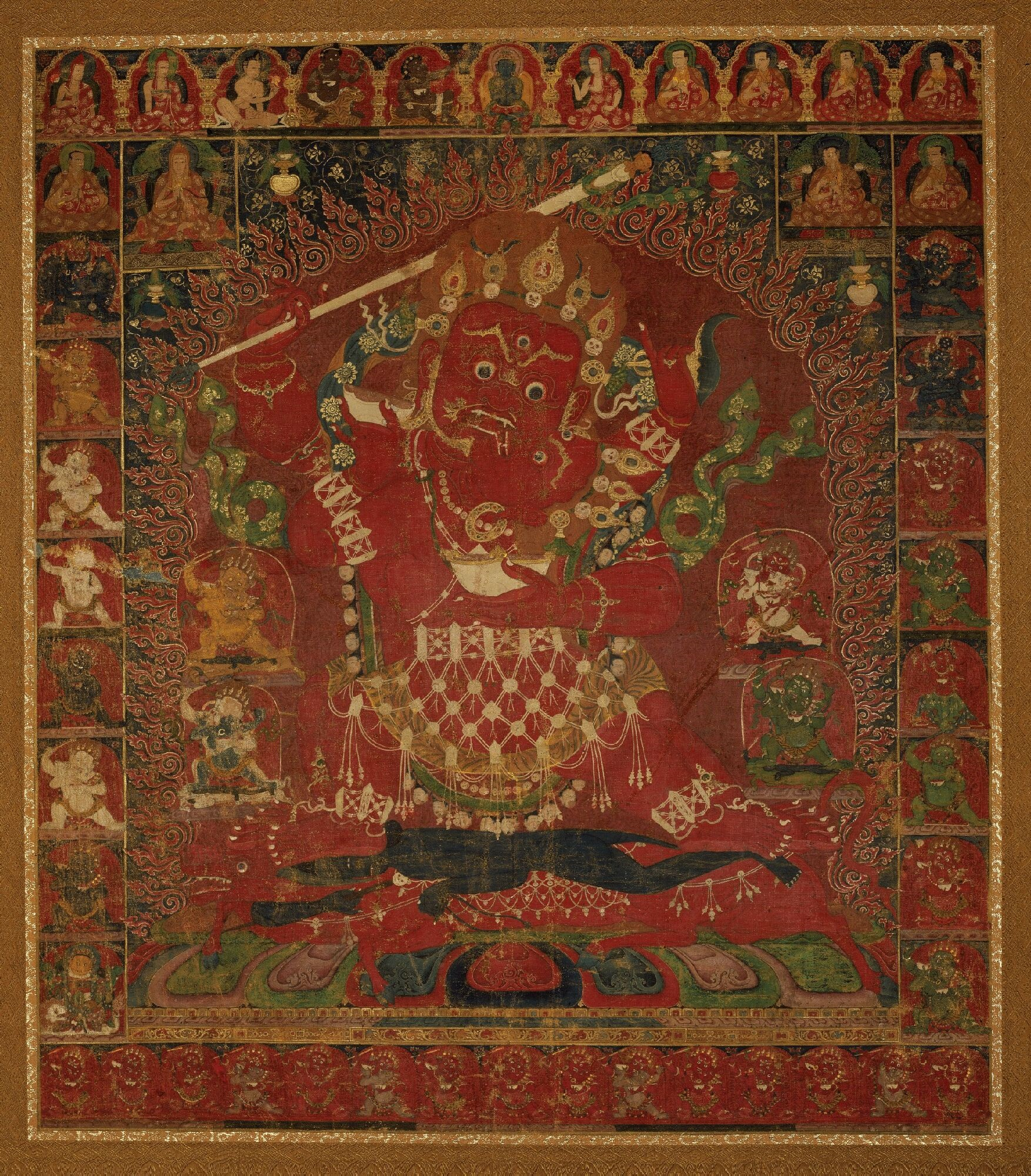
Rakta Yamari with Svabha-Prajna, 15th century, Museum of Fine Arts, Boston

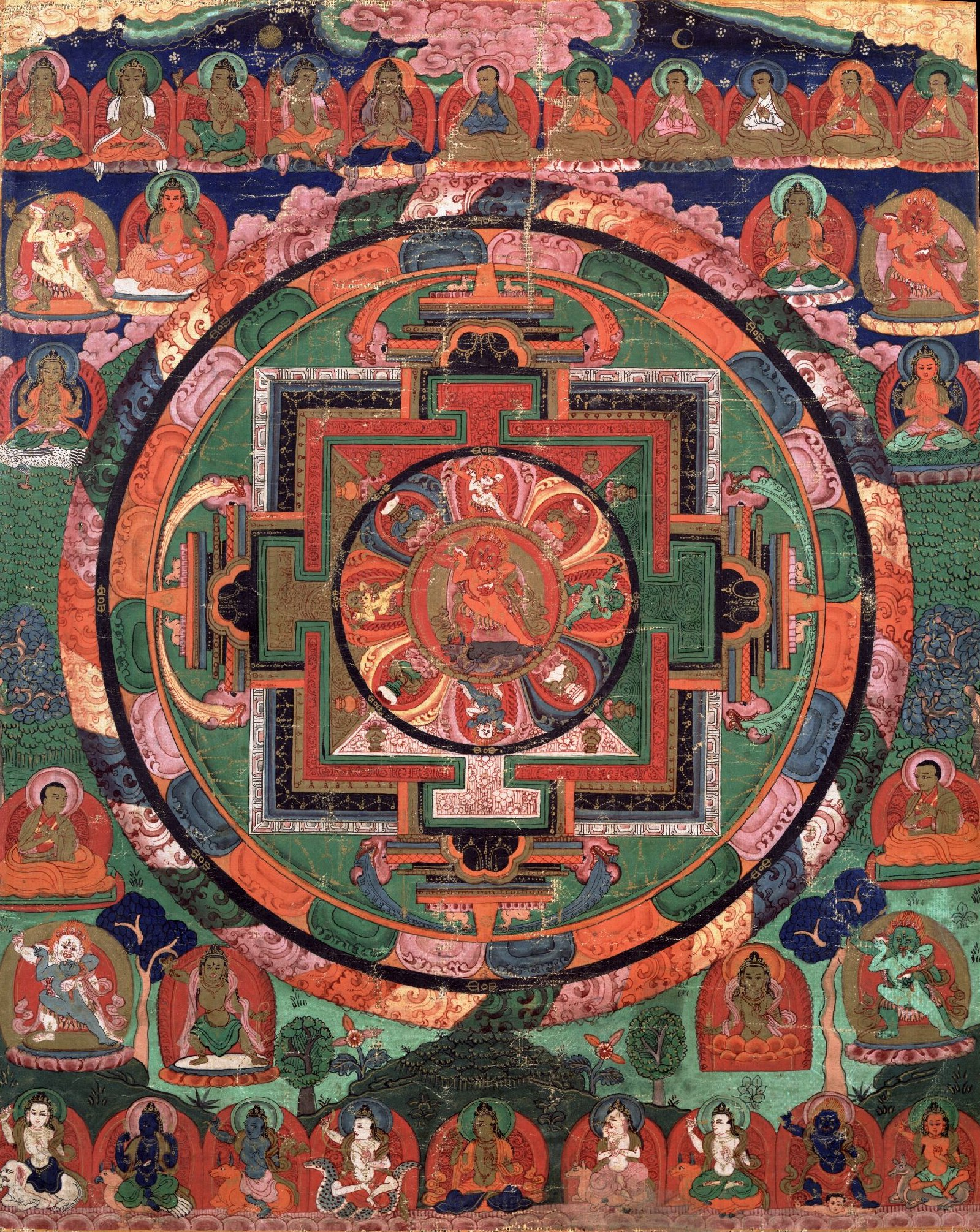
Painted 17th century Tibetan 'Five Deity Mandala', in the center is Rakta Yamari (the Red Enemy of Death) embracing his consort Vajra Vetali, in the corners are the Red, Green White and Yellow Yamaris, Rubin Museum of Art

Rakta Yamari (Tibetan: གཤིན་རྗེ་གཤེད་དམར།, Wylie: gshin rje gshed dmar) ("the Red Enemy of Death") is a Tantric Buddhist meditational deity which is a wrathful form of bodhisattva Manjushri or Yamantaka. Yamari deities have two forms: red (rakta) and black (krishna), and are part of the Anuttarayoga Class of Tantric Buddhism.

The Ngor Mandala collection of the Sakya tradition alone lists eight different forms/lineages of the blue/black buffalo-faced Vajrabhairava (which include the two Gelug ones) and four of red Rakta- or blue Krishna-Yamari (all without the buffalo head). All the former are yidams (meditational deities) whereas Yamaraja (sometimes also called Dharamaraja) is a Dharma protector.

Rakta Yamari of Virupa and Rakta Yamari of Shridhara appear in chapter 8 of The Collection of All Tantras, compiled by Jamyang Khyentse Wangpo and Jamyang Loter Wangpo.
