= Yamari =

Meditation deity

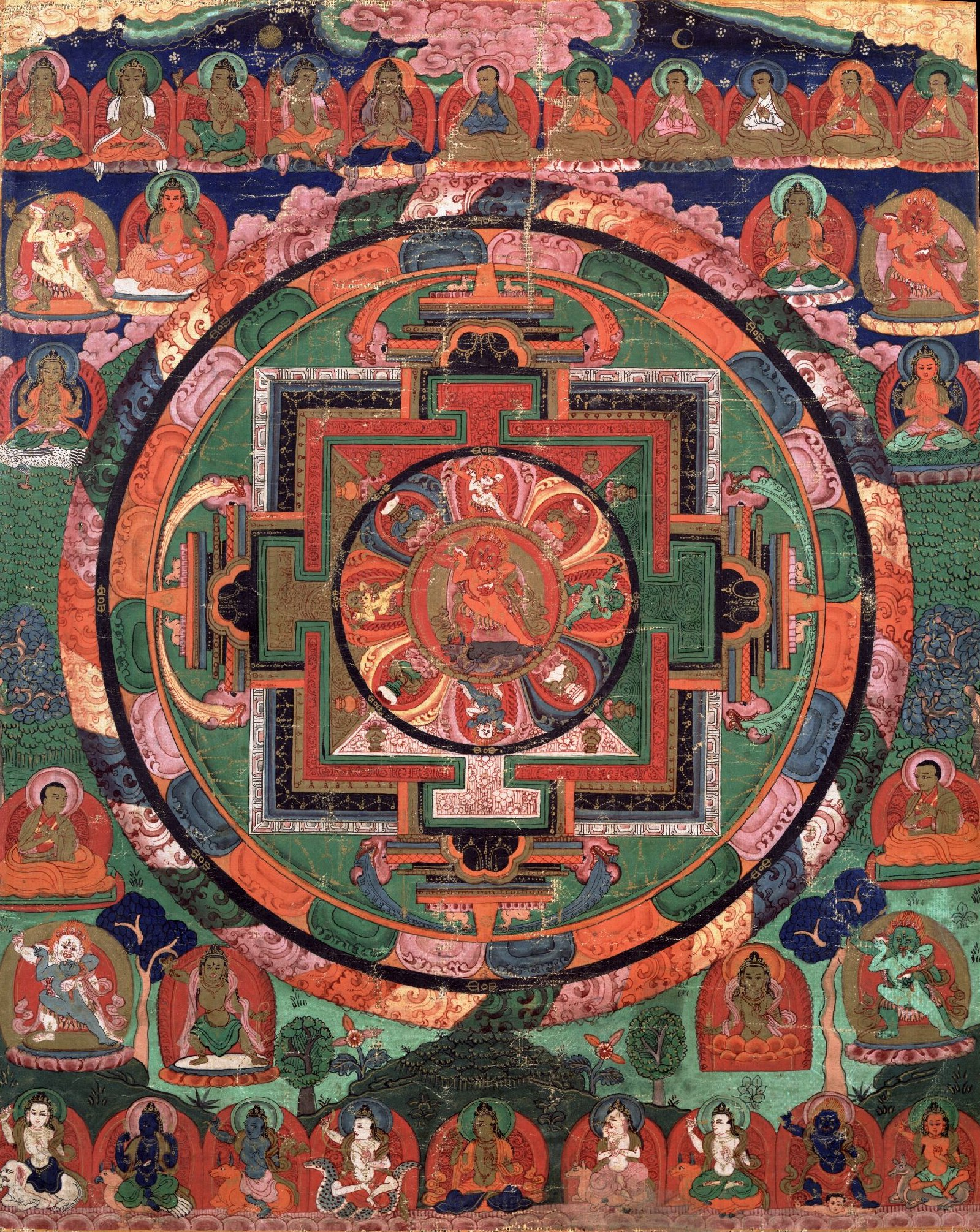
Painted 17th century Tibetan 'Five Deity Mandala', in the center is Rakta Yamari (the Red Enemy of Death) embracing his consort Vajra Vetali, in the corners are the Red, Green White and Yellow Yamaris, Rubin Museum of Art

A Yamari (གཤིན་རྗེ་གཤེད shin je she in Tibetan) is a yidam or meditation deity of the Anuttara Yoga Tantra method (father) classification. The Word यमारि yamāri in Sanskrit means Yama's Enemy There are three types of Yamari:

- Krishna Yamari (shin je she nag in Tibetan)
- Rakta Yamari (shin je she mar in Tibetan and ‘the Red Enemy of Death’ in English)
- Yamantaka (གཤིན་རྗེ་གཤེད gshin rje gshed in Tibetan) sometimes referred to as Vajrabhairava (རྡོ་རྗེ་འཇིགས་བྱེད། dor je jig je in Tibetan)
