= Mandala =

Spiritual and ritual symbol in Hinduism, Jainism and Buddhism

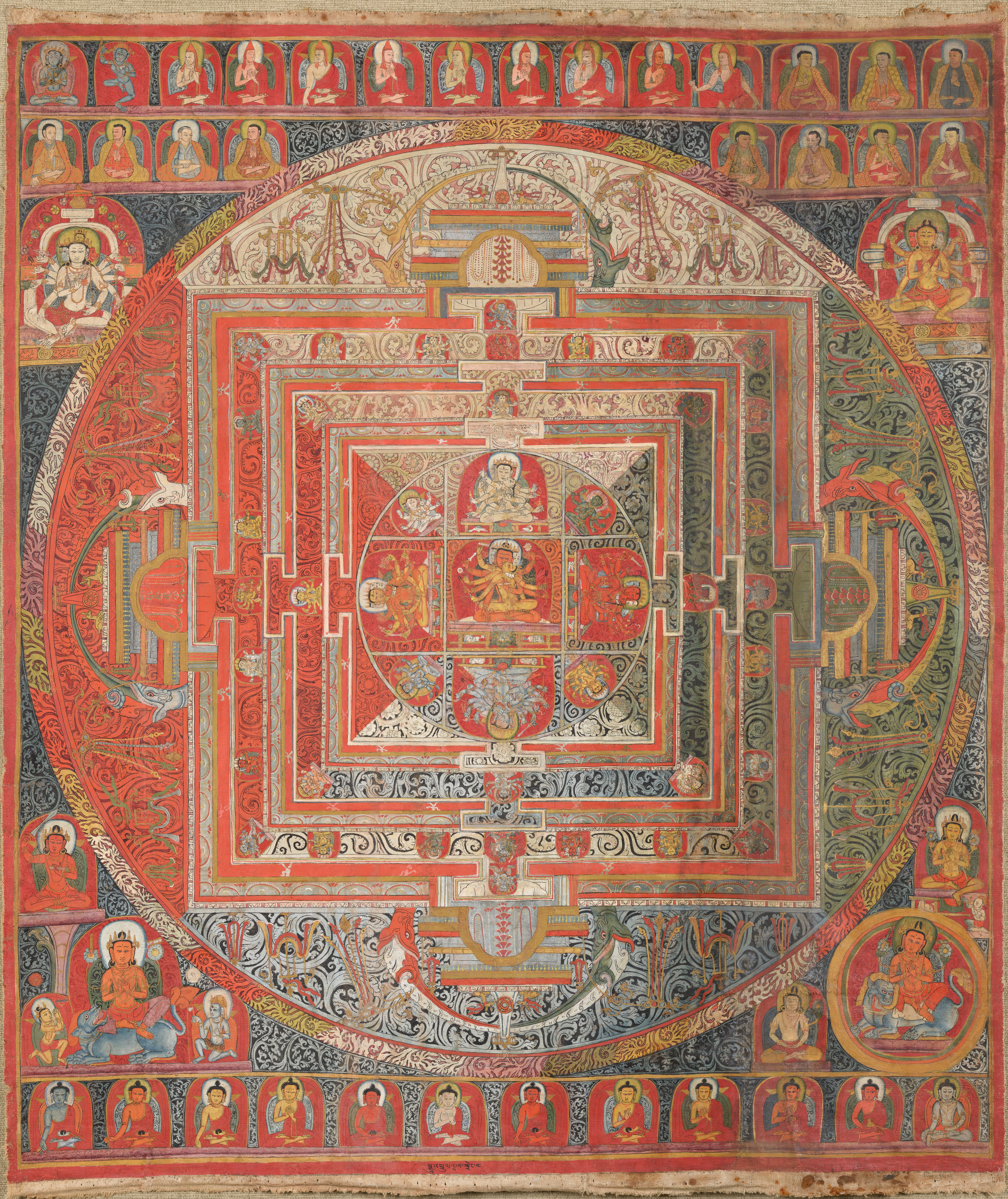
Thangka painting of Manjuvajra mandala

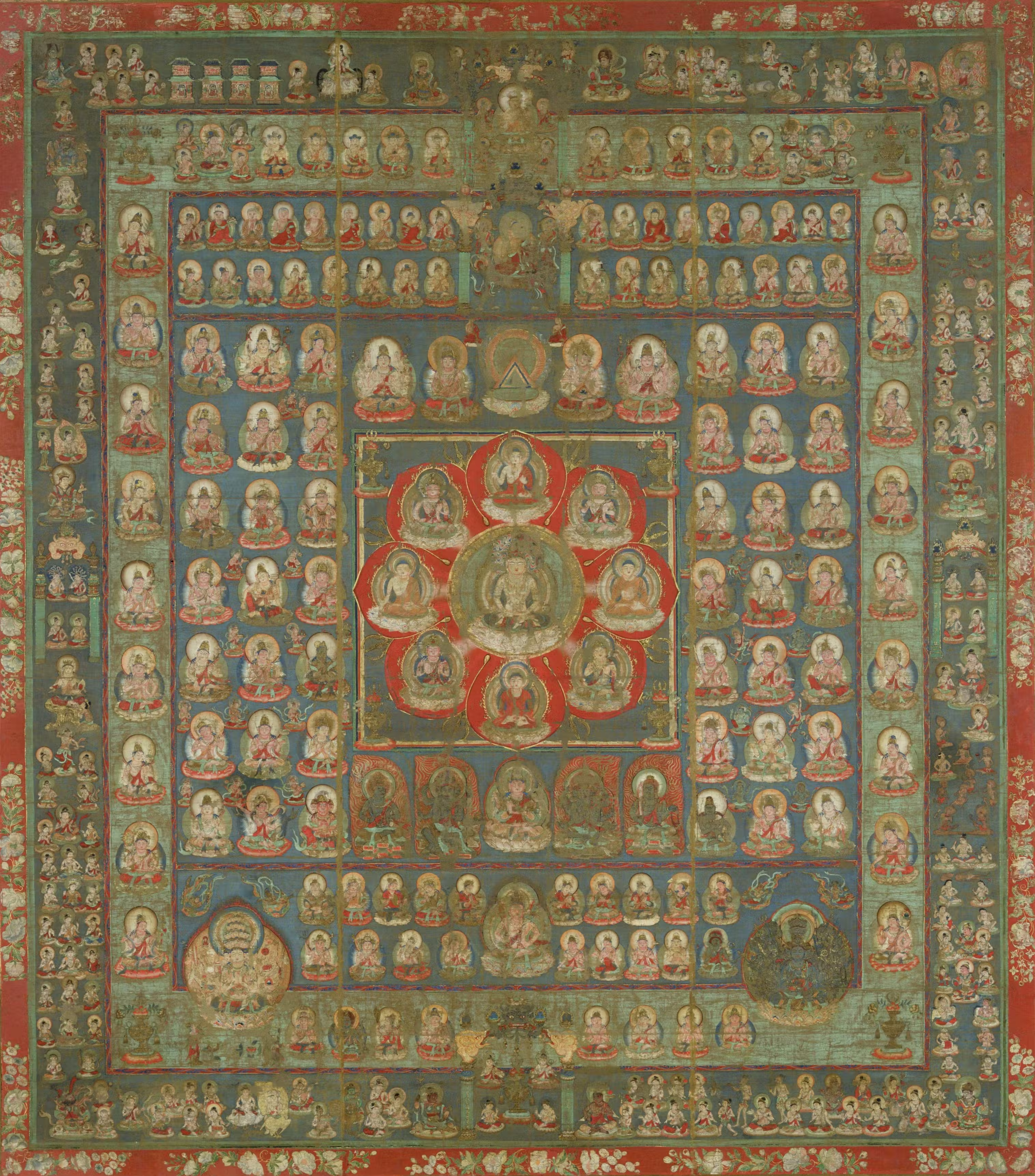
The Womb Realm mandala. The center square represents the young stage of Vairocana. He is surrounded by eight Buddhas and bodhisattvas (clockwise from top: Ratnasambhava, Samantabhadra, Saṅkusumitarāja, Manjushri, Amitābha, Avalokiteśvara, Amoghasiddhi and Maitreya)

A mandala (Sanskrit: मण्डल, romanized: maṇḍala, lit. 'circle', [ˈmɐɳɖɐlɐ]) is a geometric configuration of symbols originating in Indian religions. In various spiritual traditions, mandalas may be employed for focusing attention of practitioners and adepts, as a spiritual guidance tool, for establishing a sacred space and as an aid to meditation and trance induction. In Hinduism, Buddhism and Jainism, it is used as a map representing deities. In the Shinto religion, mandala is used as a map of paradises, kami or actual shrines.

== Hinduism ==
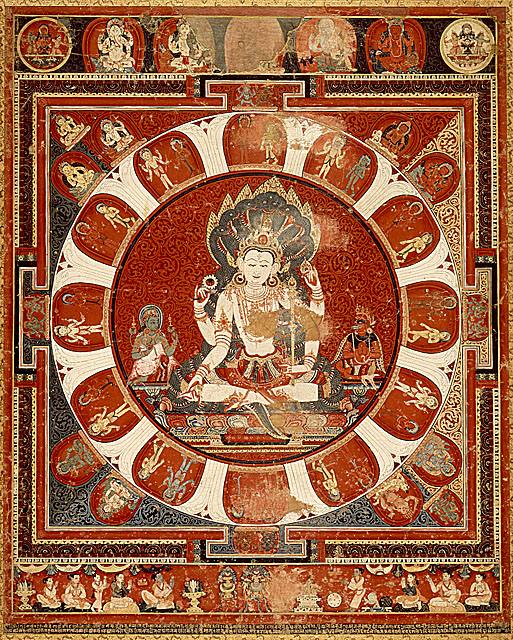
Paubha painting of Vishnu Mandala

In Hinduism, a basic mandala, also called a yantra, takes the form of a square with four gates containing a circle with a centre point. Each gate is in the general shape of a T. Mandalas often have radial balance.

A yantra is similar to a mandala, usually smaller and using a more limited colour palette. It may be a two- or three-dimensional geometric composition used in sadhanas, puja or meditative rituals, and may incorporate a mantra into its design. It is considered to represent the abode of the deity. Each yantra is unique and calls the deity into the presence of the practitioner through the elaborate symbolic geometric designs. According to one scholar, "Yantras function as revelatory symbols of cosmic truths and as instructional charts of the spiritual aspect of human experience".

Many situate yantras as central focus points for Hindu tantric practice. Yantras are not representations, but are lived, experiential, nondual realities. As Khanna describes:

Despite its cosmic meanings a yantra is a reality lived. Because of the relationship that exists in the Tantras between the outer world (the macrocosm) and man's inner world (the microcosm), every symbol in a yantra is ambivalently resonant in inner–outer synthesis, and is associated with the subtle body and aspects of human consciousness.

The term 'mandala' appears in the Rigveda as the name of the sections of the work, and Vedic rituals use mandalas such as the Navagraha mandala to this day.

For each tantric tradition, its mandala is the most important visual form. Abhinavagupta in his Tantrāloka textually describes the four key mandalas of the Trika tradition, which were translated, decoded and illustrated by Christian de Vietri in his book Trika Maṇḍala Prakāśa.

== Buddhism ==
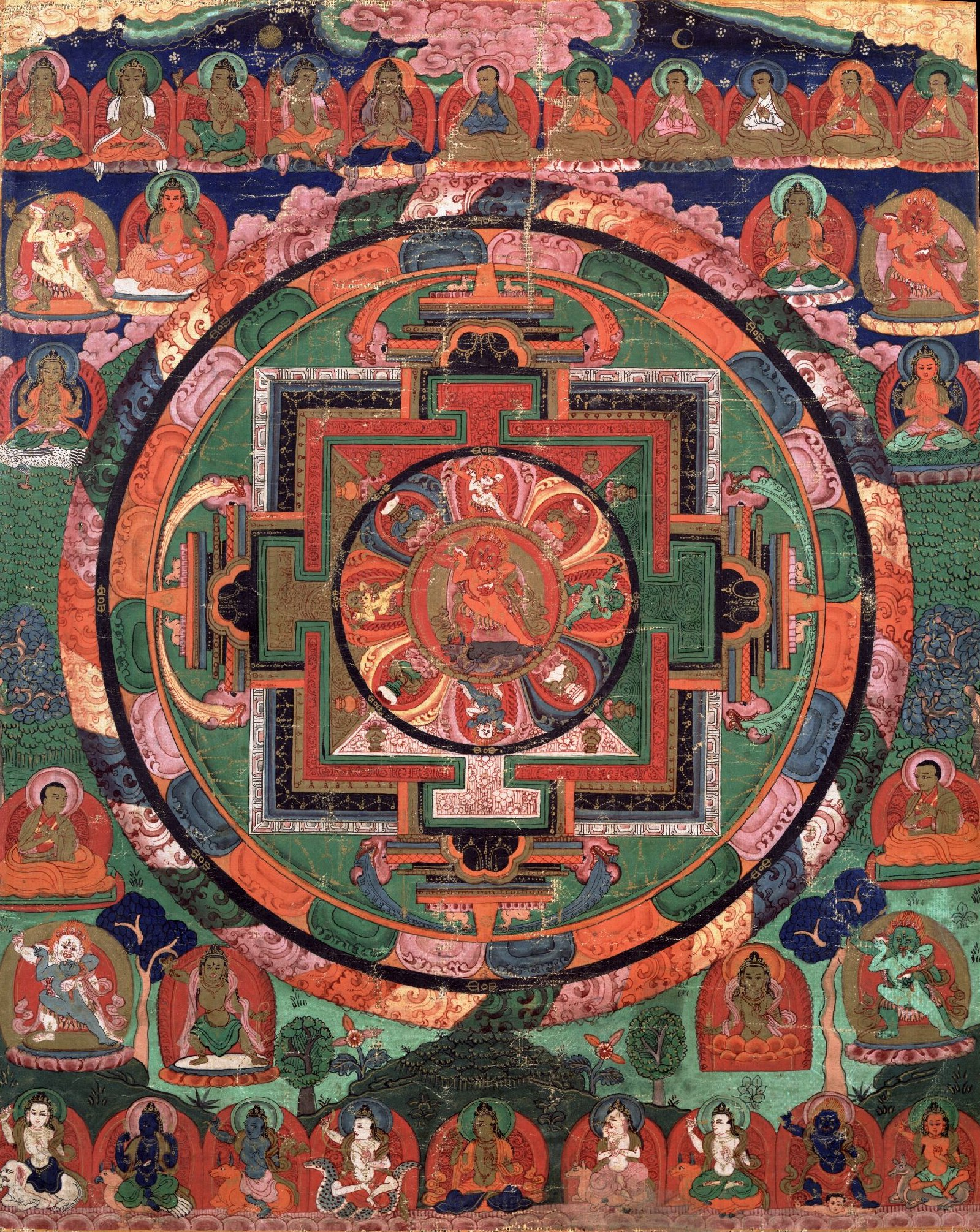
Painted 17th-century Tibetan 'Five Deity Mandala', in the centre is Rakta Yamari (the Red Enemy of Death) embracing his consort Vajra Vetali, in the corners are the Red, Green, White and Yellow Yamaris, Rubin Museum of Art

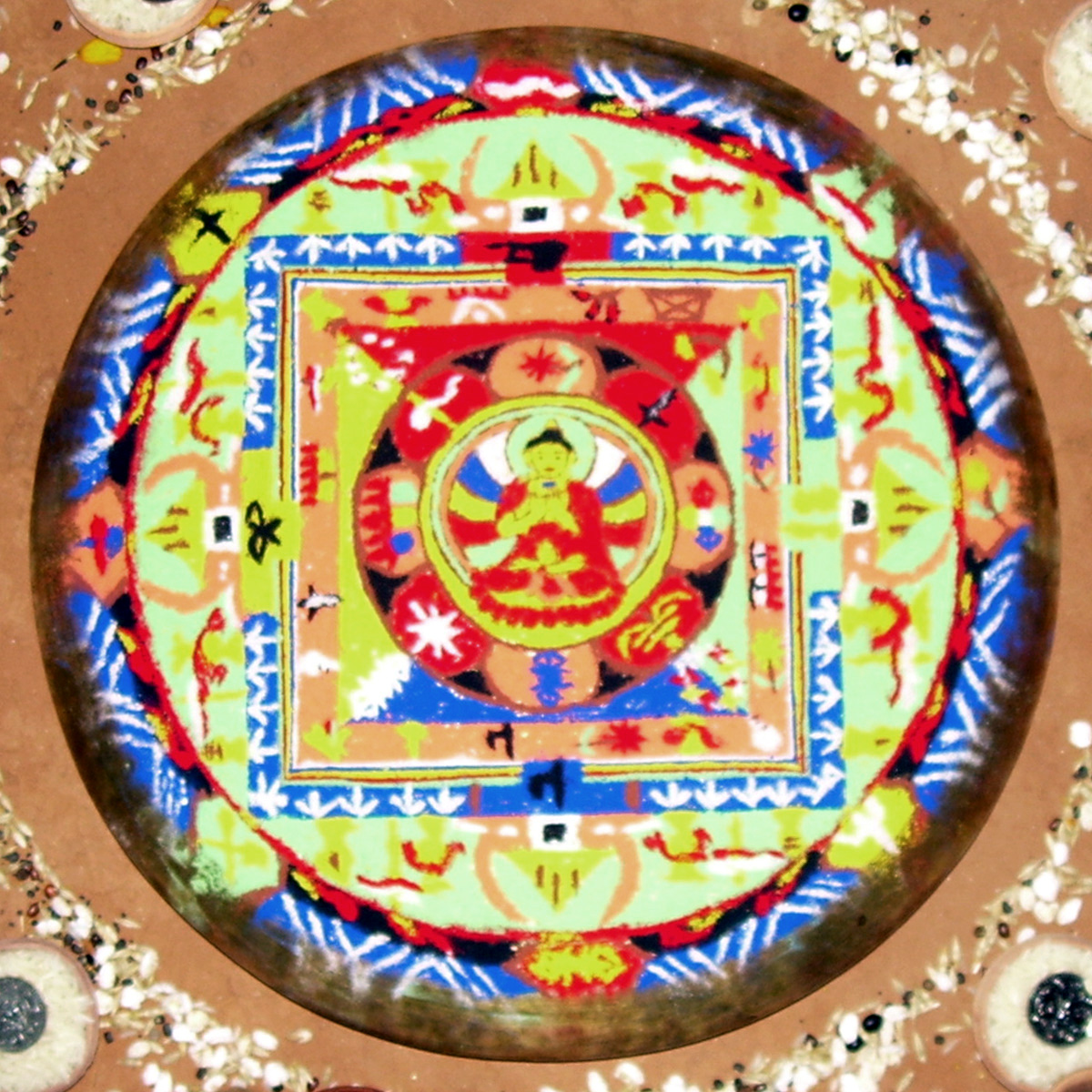
Sandpainting showing Buddha mandala, which is made as part of the death rituals among Buddhist Newars of Nepal

=== Vajrayana ===
In Vajrayana Buddhism, mandalas have been developed also into sandpainting. They are also a key part of Anuttarayoga Tantra meditation practices.

==== Visualisation of Vajrayana teachings ====
The mandala can visually represent the core essence of the Vajrayana teachings. The mandala represents the nature of the Pure Land, Enlightened mind.

An example of this type of mandala is a Vajrabhairava mandala, a silk tapestry woven with gilded paper depicting lavish elements like crowns and jewelry, which gives a three-dimensional effect to the piece.

===== Mount Meru =====
A mandala can also represent the entire universe, which is traditionally depicted with Mount Meru as the axis mundi in the center, surrounded by the continents. One example is the Cosmological Mandala with Mount Meru, a silk tapestry from the Yuan dynasty that serves as a diagram of the Tibetan cosmology, which was given to China from Nepal and Tibet.

===== Wisdom and impermanence =====
In the mandala, the outer circle of fire usually symbolises wisdom. The ring of eight charnel grounds represents the Buddhist exhortation to be always mindful of death, and the impermanence with which samsara is suffused: "such locations were utilized in order to confront and to realize the transient nature of life". Described elsewhere: "within a flaming rainbow nimbus and encircled by a black ring of dorjes, the major outer ring depicts the eight great charnel grounds, to emphasize the dangerous nature of human life". Inside these rings lie the walls of the mandala palace itself, specifically a place populated by deities and Buddhas.

===== Five Buddhas =====
One well-known type of mandala is the mandala of the "Five Buddhas", archetypal Buddha forms embodying various aspects of enlightenment. Such Buddhas are depicted depending on the school of Buddhism, and even the specific purpose of the mandala. A common mandala of this type is that of the Five Wisdom Buddhas (a.k.a. Five Jinas), the Buddhas Vairocana, Aksobhya, Ratnasambhava, Amitabha and Amoghasiddhi. When paired with another mandala depicting the Five Wisdom Kings, this forms the Mandala of the Two Realms.

==== Practice ====
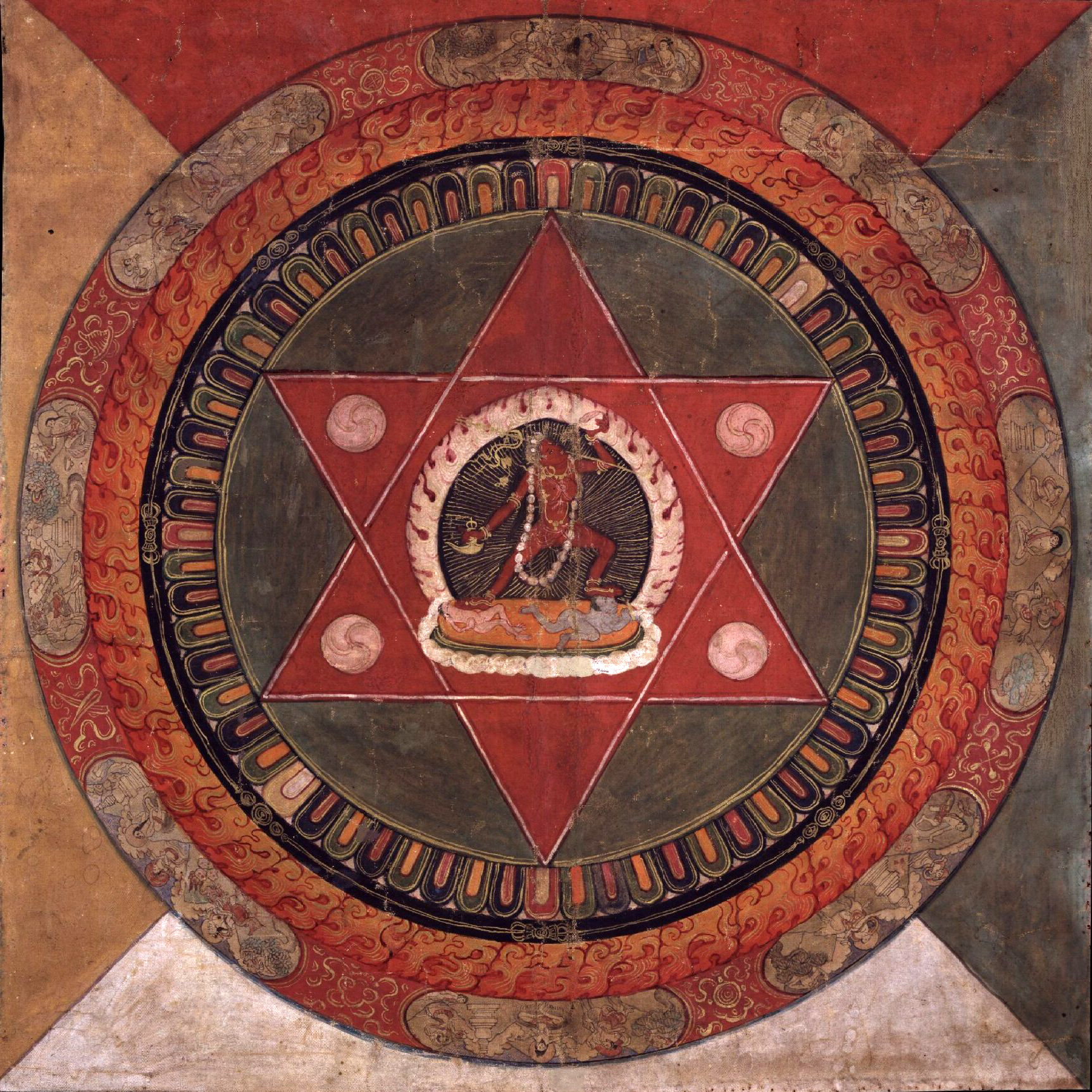
Tantric mandala of Vajrayogini

Mandalas are commonly used by tantric Buddhists as an aid to meditation.

The mandala is "a support for the meditating person", something to be repeatedly contemplated to the point of saturation, such that the image of the mandala becomes fully internalised in even the minutest detail and can then be summoned and contemplated at will as a clear and vivid visualized image. With every mandala comes what Tucci calls "its associated liturgy ... contained in texts known as tantras", instructing practitioners on how the mandala should be drawn, built and visualised, and indicating the mantras to be recited during its ritual use.

By visualizing "pure lands", one learns to understand experience itself as pure, and as the abode of enlightenment. The protection that we need, in this view, is from our own minds, as much as from external sources of confusion. In many tantric mandalas, this aspect of separation and protection from the outer samsaric world is depicted by "the four outer circles: the purifying fire of wisdom, the vajra circle, the circle with the eight tombs, the lotus circle". The ring of vajras forms a connected fence-like arrangement running around the perimeter of the outer mandala circle.

As a meditation on impermanence (a central teaching of Buddhism), after days or weeks of creating the intricate pattern of a sand mandala, the sand is brushed together into a pile and spilled into a body of running water to spread the blessings of the mandala.

Kværne in his extended discussion of sahaja, discusses the relationship of sadhana interiority and exteriority in relation to mandala thus:

...external ritual and internal sadhana form an indistinguishable whole, and this unity finds its most pregnant expression in the form of the mandala, the sacred enclosure consisting of concentric squares and circles drawn on the ground and representing that adamant plane of being on which the aspirant to Buddha hood wishes to establish himself. The unfolding of the tantric ritual depends on the mandala; and where a material mandala is not employed, the adept proceeds to construct one mentally in the course of his meditation."

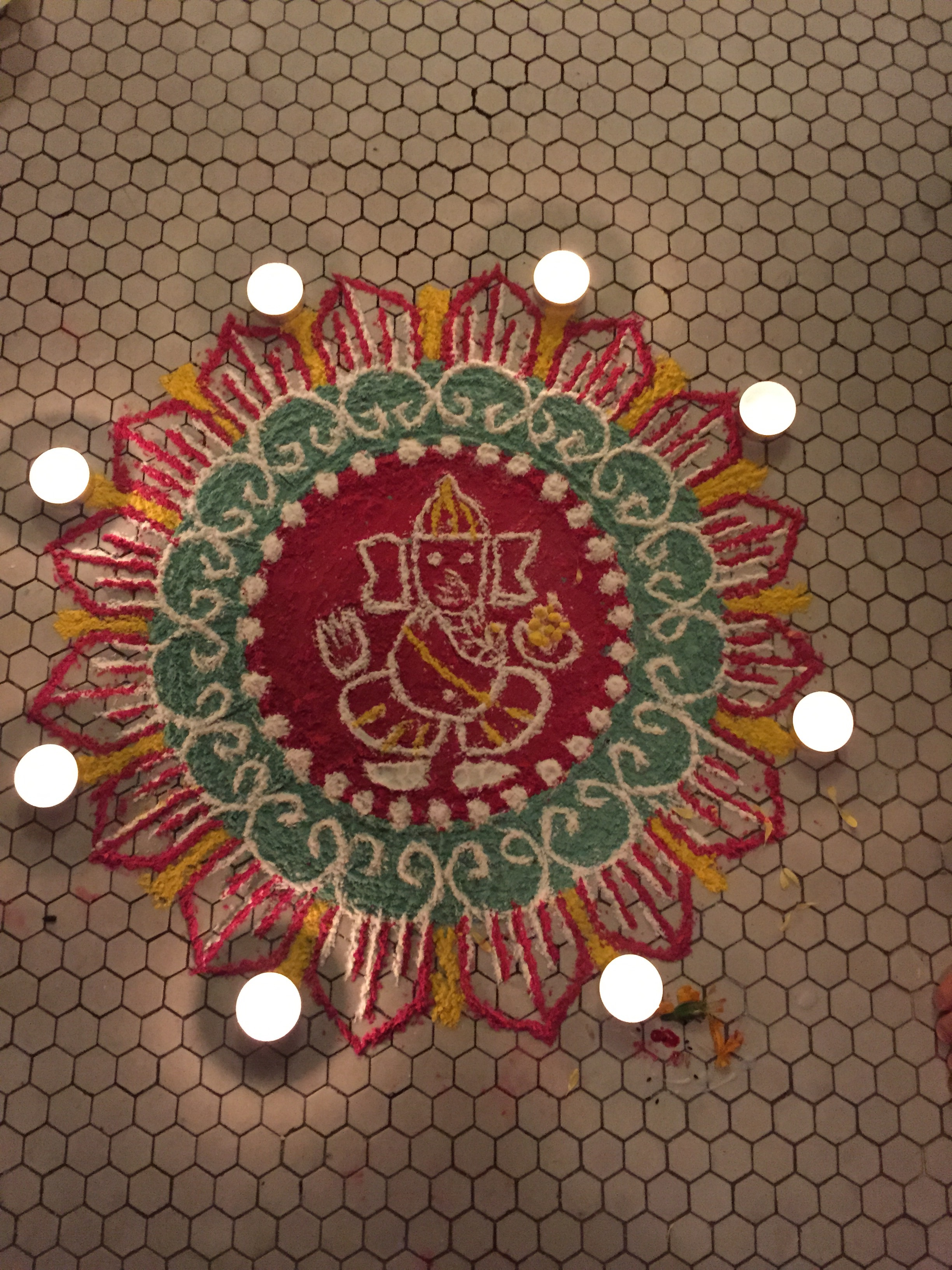
Mandala Hindu Rangoli art form

==== Offerings ====
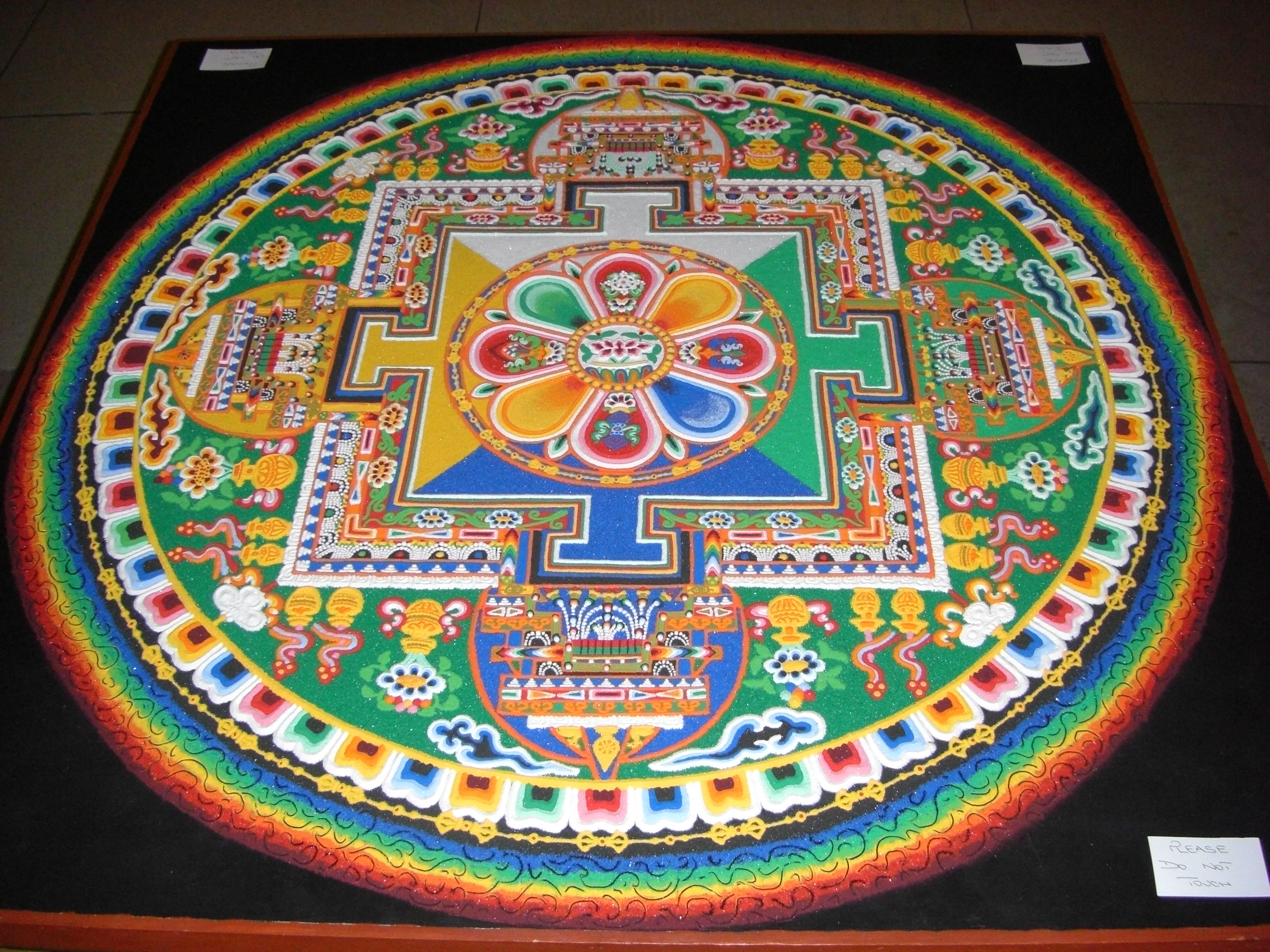
Chenrezig sand mandala created at the House of Commons of the United Kingdom on the occasion of the Dalai Lama's visit in May 2008

A "mandala offering" in Tibetan Buddhism is a symbolic offering of the entire universe. Every intricate detail of these mandalas is fixed in the tradition and has specific symbolic meanings, often on more than one level.

Whereas the above mandala represents the pure surroundings of a Buddha, this mandala represents the universe. This type of mandala is used for the mandala-offerings, during which one symbolically offers the universe to the Buddhas or to one's teacher. Within Vajrayana practice, 100,000 of these mandala offerings (to create merit) can be part of the preliminary practices before a student even begins actual tantric practices. This mandala is generally structured according to the model of the universe as taught in a Buddhist classic text the Abhidharma-kośa, with Mount Meru at the centre, surrounded by the continents, oceans and mountains, etc.

=== Theravada Buddhism ===
Various Mandalas are described in many Pali Buddhist texts. Some of the examples of the Theravada Buddhist Mandalas are:

- Mandala of Eight Disciples of Buddha describing the Shakyamuni Buddha at center and Eight great disciple in eight major directions.
- Mandala of Buddhas is the mandala consisting of nine major Buddhas of the past and the present Gautama Buddha occupying the ten directions.
- Mandala of Eight Devis includes the eight Devis occupying and protecting the eight corners of the Universe.

In Sigālovāda Sutta, Buddha describes the relationships of a common lay persons in Mandala style.

=== Shingon Buddhism ===
One Japanese branch of Mahayana Buddhism – Shingon Buddhism – makes frequent use of mandalas in its rituals as well, though the actual mandalas differ. When Shingon's founder, Kūkai, returned from his training in China, he brought back two mandalas that became central to Shingon ritual: the Mandala of the Womb Realm and the Mandala of the Diamond Realm.

These two mandalas are engaged in the abhiseka initiation rituals for new Shingon students, more commonly known as the Kechien Kanjō (結縁灌頂). A common feature of this ritual is to blindfold the new initiate and to have them throw a flower upon either mandala. Where the flower lands assists in the determination of which tutelary deity the initiate should follow.

=== Nichiren Buddhism ===
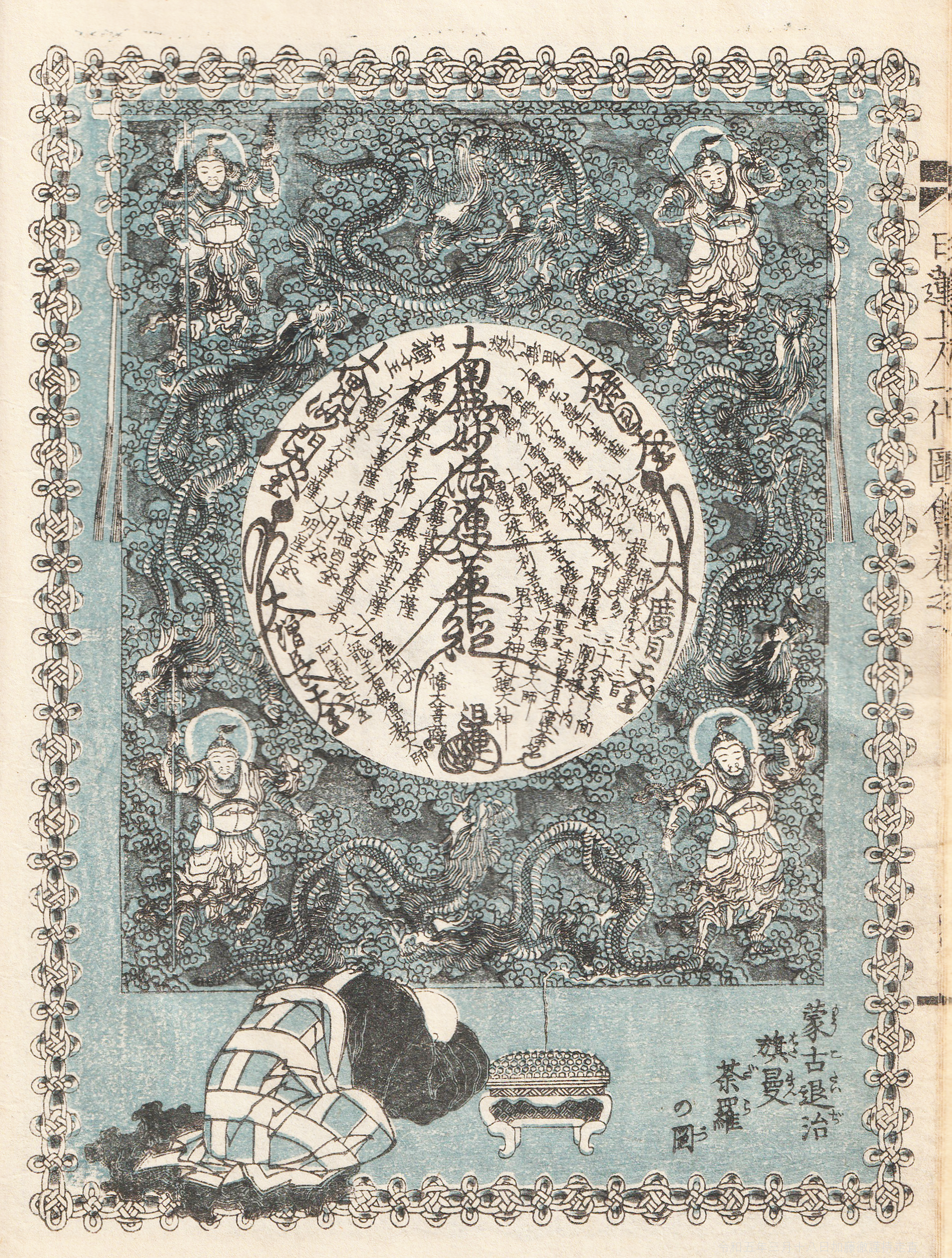
Nichiren bowing before MOJI-MANDALA which he wrote.

The mandala in Nichiren Buddhism is a moji-mandala (文字曼陀羅), which is a paper hanging scroll or wooden tablet whose inscription consists of Chinese characters and medieval-Sanskrit script representing elements of the Buddha's enlightenment, protective Buddhist deities, and certain Buddhist concepts. Called the Gohonzon, it was originally inscribed by Nichiren, the founder of this branch of Japanese Buddhism, during the late 13th Century. The Gohonzon is the primary object of veneration in some Nichiren schools and the only one in others, which consider it to be the supreme object of worship as the embodiment of the supreme Dharma and Nichiren's inner enlightenment. The seven characters Namu Myōhō Renge Kyō, considered to be the name of the supreme Dharma, as well as the invocation that believers chant, are written down the center of all Nichiren-sect Gohonzons, whose appearance may otherwise vary depending on the particular school and other factors.

=== Pure Land Buddhism ===
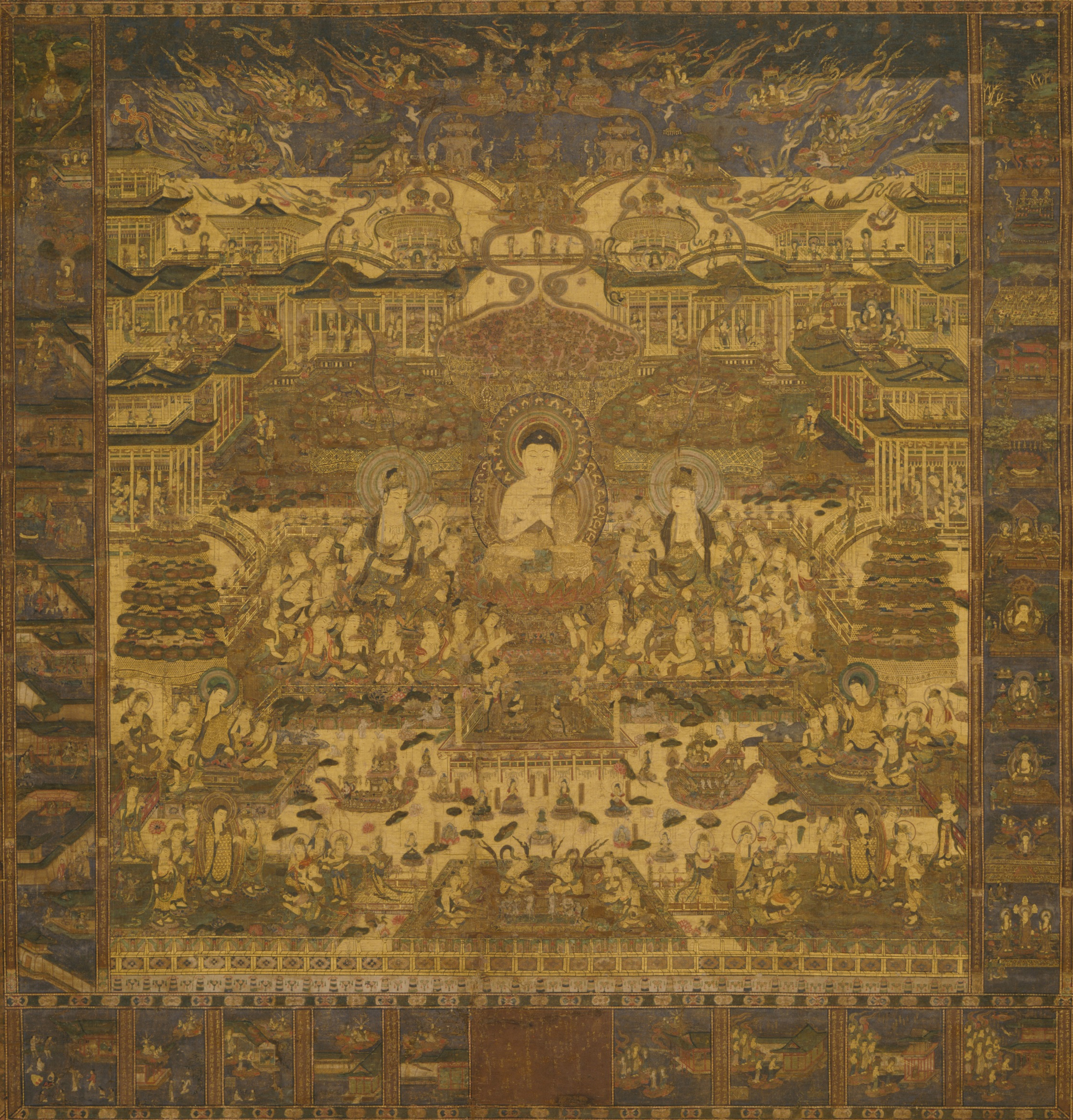
Pure Land Taima Mandala, Kamakura period, 14th century, Japan (Kyushu National Museum)

Mandalas have sometimes been used in Pure Land Buddhism to graphically represent Pure Lands, based on descriptions found in the Larger Sutra and the Contemplation Sutra. The most famous mandala in Japan is the Taima mandala, dated to about 763 CE. The Taima mandala is based on the Contemplation Sutra, but other similar mandalas have been made subsequently. Unlike mandalas used in Vajrayana Buddhism, it is not used as an object of meditation or for esoteric ritual. Instead, it provides a visual representation of the Pure Land texts, and is used as a teaching aid.

Also in Jodo Shinshu Buddhism, Shinran and his descendant, Rennyo, sought a way to create easily accessible objects of reverence for the lower-classes of Japanese society. Shinran designed a mandala using a hanging scroll, and the words of the nembutsu (念仏) written vertically. This style of mandala is still used by some Jodo Shinshu Buddhists in home altars, or butsudan.

=== Bodhimandala ===
Bodhimaṇḍala is a term in Buddhism that means "circle of awakening".

== Sand mandalas ==
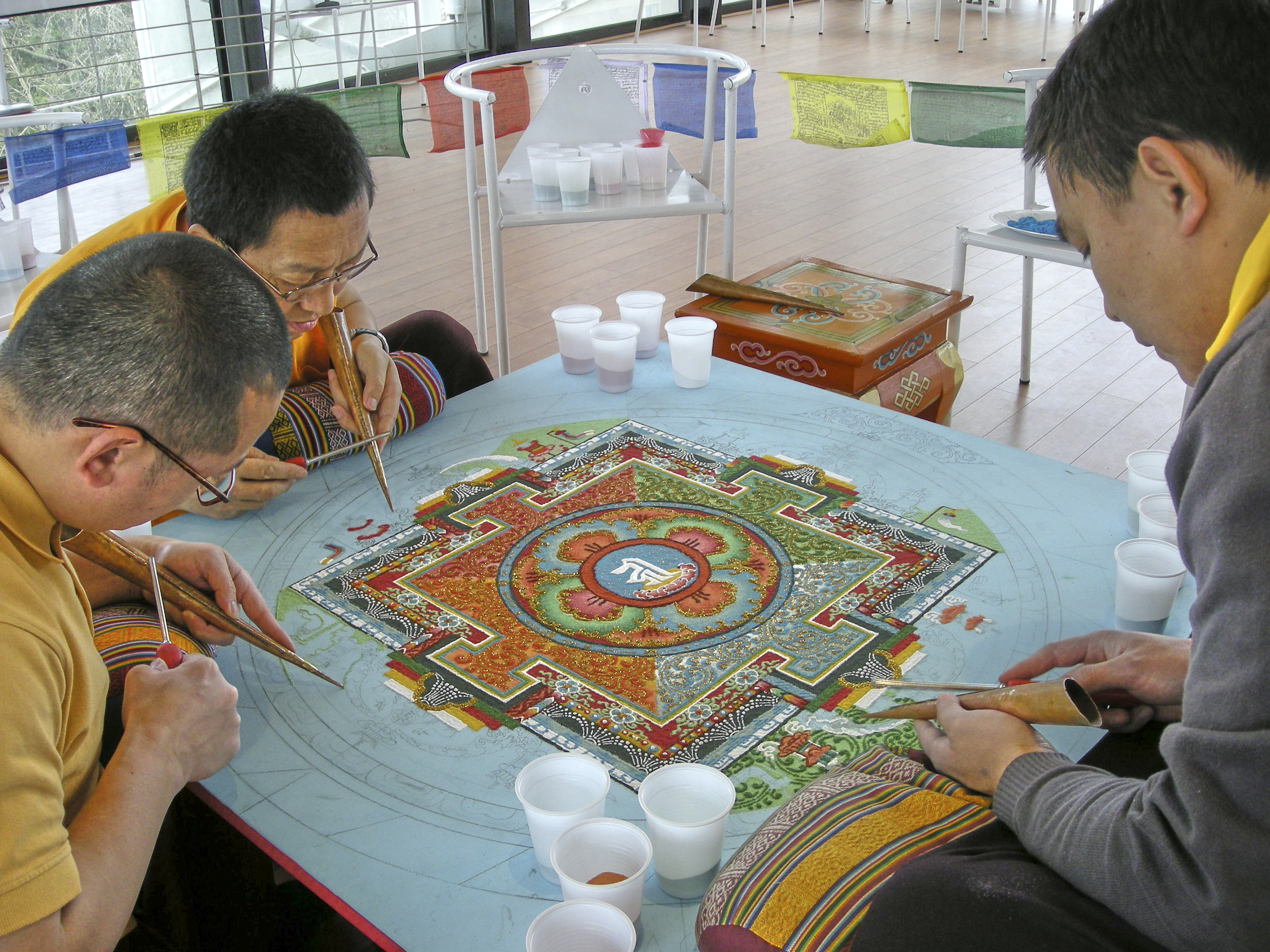
Sand Mandala in the making

Sand mandalas are colorful mandalas made from sand that are ritualistically destroyed. They originated in India in the 8th–12th century but are now practiced in Tibetan Buddhism. Each mandala is dedicated to specific deities. In Buddhism Deities represent states of the mind to be obtained on the path to enlightenment, the mandala itself is representative of the deity's palace which also represents the mind of the deity. Each mandala is a pictorial representation of a tantra. For the process of making Sand mandalas they are created by monks who have trained for three–five years in a monastery. These sand mandalas are made to be destroyed to symbolize impermanence, the Buddhist belief that death is not the end, and that one's essence will always return to the elements. It is also related to the belief that one should not become attached to anything. To create these mandalas, the monks first create a sketch, then take colorful sand traditionally made from powdered stones and gems into copper funnels called Cornetts and gently tap sand out of them to create the sand mandala. Each color represents attributes of deities. While making the mandalas the monks will pray and meditate, each grain of sand represents a blessing. Monks will travel to demonstrate this art form to people, often in museums.

== Western psychological interpretations ==
The re-introduction of mandalas into modern Western thought is largely credited to psychologist Carl Gustav Jung. In his exploration of the unconscious through art, Jung observed the common appearance of a circle motif across religions and cultures. He hypothesized that the circle drawings reflected the mind's inner state at the moment of creation and were a kind of symbolic archetype in the collective unconscious. Familiarity with the philosophical writings of India prompted Jung to adopt the word "mandala" to describe these drawings created by himself and his patients. In his autobiography, Jung wrote:

I sketched every morning in a notebook a small circular drawing, [...] which seemed to correspond to my inner situation at the time. [...] Only gradually did I discover what the mandala really is: [...] the Self, the wholeness of the personality, which if all goes well is harmonious.

— Carl Jung, Memories, Dreams, Reflections, pp. 195–196. p.232 Vintage books revised edition (Doubleday)

When I began drawing the mandalas, however, I saw that everything, all the paths I had been following, all the steps I had taken, were leading back to a single point—namely, to the mid-point. It became increasingly plain to me that the mandala is the center. It is the exponent of all paths. It is the path to the center, to individuation....I saw that here the goal had been revealed. One could not go beyond the center. The center is the goal, and everything is directed toward that center. Through this dream, I understood that the self is the principle and archetype of orientation and meaning. Therein lies its healing function. For me, this insight signified an approach to the center and therefore to the goal.

— Carl Jung, Memories, Dreams, Reflections, pp. 233–235 Vintage Books revised edition (Doubleday)

Jung claimed that the urge to make mandalas emerges during moments of intense personal growth. He further hypothesized their appearance indicated a "profound re-balancing process" is underway in the psyche; the result of the process would be a more complex and better integrated personality.

The mandala serves a conservative purpose – namely, to restore a previously existing order. But it also serves the creative purpose of giving expression and form to something that does not yet exist, something new and unique. [...] The process is that of the ascending spiral, which grows upward while simultaneously returning again and again to the same point.

— Marie-Louise von Franz, In Man and His Symbols (C. G. Jung, Ed.), p. 225,

American art therapist Joan Kellogg later created the MARI card test, a free response measure, based on Jung's work.

Transpersonal psychologist David Fontana proposed that the symbolic nature of a mandala may help one "to access progressively deeper levels of the unconscious, ultimately assisting the meditator to experience a mystical sense of oneness with the ultimate unity from which the cosmos in all its manifold forms arises."

== In architecture ==
Buddhist architecture often applied mandala as the blueprint or plan to design Buddhist structures, including temple complex and stupas. A notable example of mandala in architecture is the 9th century Borobudur in Central Java, Indonesia. It is built as a large stupa surrounded by smaller ones arranged on terraces formed as a stepped pyramid, and when viewed from above, takes the form of a giant tantric Buddhist mandala, simultaneously representing the Buddhist cosmology and the nature of mind. Other temples from the same period that also have mandala plans include Sewu, Plaosan and Prambanan. Similar mandala designs are also observable in Cambodia, Thailand and Myanmar.

Aerial view of the Boudhanath stupa resembles a mandala

Borobudur ground plan taking the form of a Mandala

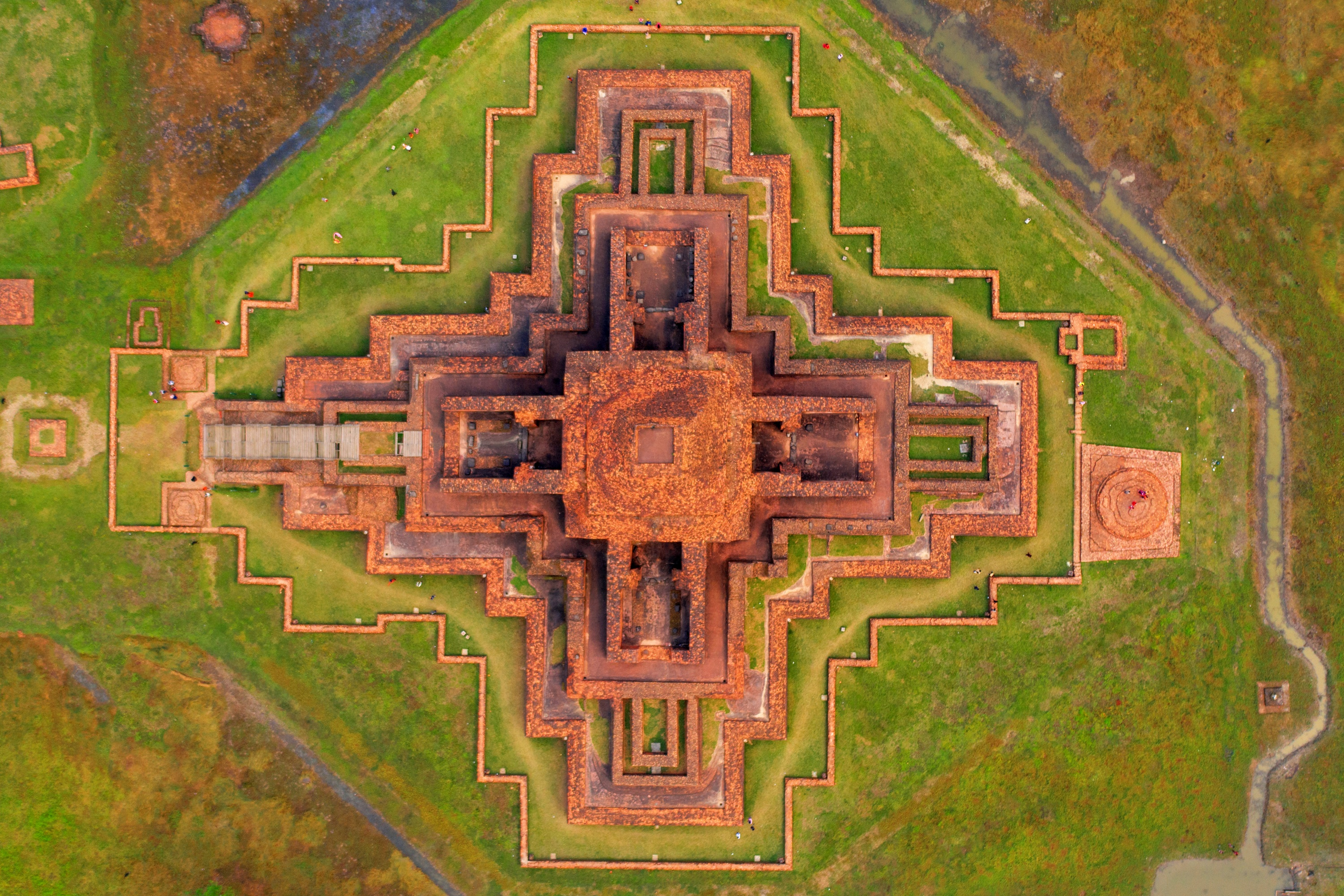
7th century Buddhist monastery in Bangladesh. Somapura Mahavihara

== In science ==
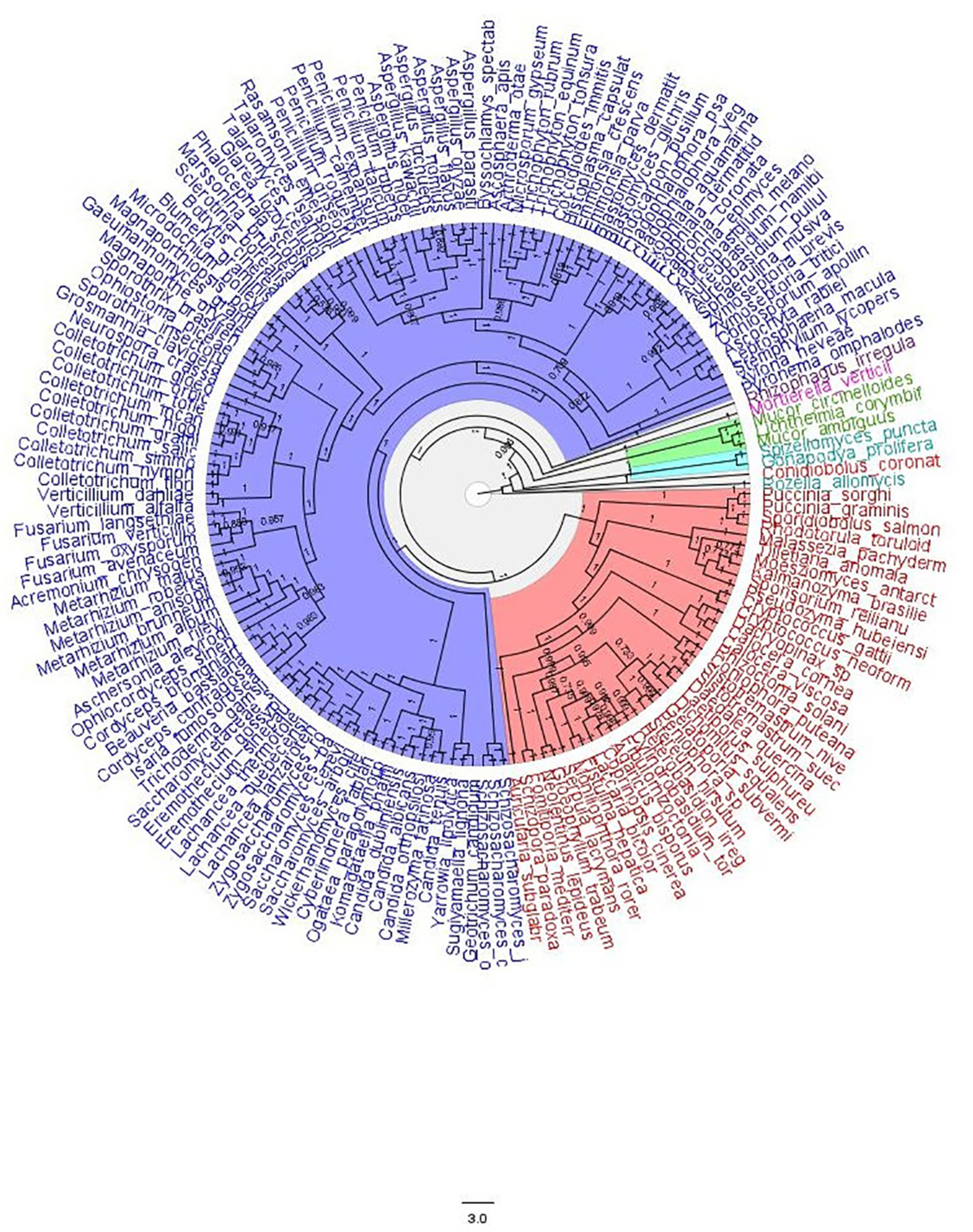
Circular phylogenetic subtree of fungi.

Circular diagrams are often used in phylogenetics, especially for the graphical representation of phylogenetic relationships. Evolutionary trees often encompass numerous species that are conveniently shown on a circular tree, with images of the species shown on the periphery of a tree. Such diagrams have been called phylogenetic mandalas.

== In art ==
Mandala as an art form first appeared in Buddhist art that were produced in India during the first century B.C.E. These can also be seen in Rangoli designs in Indian households.

== In archaeology ==
In 2013, five giant mandalas were uncovered in the valley of Manipur, India. Located in the paddy field in the west of Imphal, the capital of Manipur, the Maklang geoglyph is perhaps the world's largest mandala built entirely of mud. The site wasn't discovered until 2013 as its whole structure could only be visible via Google Earth satellite imagery. The whole paddy field, locally known as Bihu Loukon, is now protected and announced as historical monument and site by the government of Manipur in the same year. The site is situated 12 km (7 miles) aerial distance from Kangla with the GPS coordinates of 24° 48' N and 93° 49' E. It covers a total area of around 224,161.45 square meters (55 acres). This square mandala has four similar protruding rectangular ‘gates’ in the cardinal directions guarded each by similar but smaller rectangular ‘gates’ on the left and right. Within the square there is an eight petalled flower or rayed-star, known as the Maklang ‘Star fort’ by the locals, in the centre covering a total area of around 50,836.66 square meters (12½ acres). The discovery of other five giant mandalas in the valley of Manipur was also made with Google Earth. The five giant mandalas, viz., Sekmai mandala, Heikakmapal mandala, Phurju twin mandalas and Sangolmang mandala are located on the western bank of the Iril River. Another two fairly large mandala shaped geoglyph at Nongren and Keinou are also reported from Manipur valley, India, in 2019. They are named as Nongren mandala and Keinou mandala.

== In politics ==
The Rajamandala (or Raja-mandala; circle of states) was formulated by the Indian author Kautilya in his work on politics, the Arthashastra (written between 4th century BCE and 2nd century BCE). It describes circles of friendly and enemy states surrounding the king's state.

In historical, social and political sense, the term "mandala" is also employed to denote traditional Southeast Asian political formations (such as federation of kingdoms or vassalized states). It was adopted by 20th century Western historians from ancient Indian political discourse as a means of avoiding the term 'state' in the conventional sense. Not only did Southeast Asian polities not conform to Chinese and European views of a territorially defined state with fixed borders and a bureaucratic apparatus, but they diverged considerably in the opposite direction: the polity was defined by its centre rather than its boundaries, and it could be composed of numerous other tributary polities without undergoing administrative integration. Empires such as Bagan, Ayutthaya, Champa, Khmer, Srivijaya and Majapahit are known as "mandala" in this sense.

== In contemporary use ==
Fashion designer Mandali Mendrilla designed an interactive art installation called Mandala of Desires (Blue Lotus Wish Tree) made in peace silk and eco friendly textile ink, displayed at the China Art Museum in Shanghai in November 2015. The pattern of the dress was based on the Goloka Yantra mandala, shaped as a lotus with eight petals. Visitors were invited to place a wish on the sculpture dress, which will be taken to India and offered to a genuine living Wish Tree.

== Gallery ==
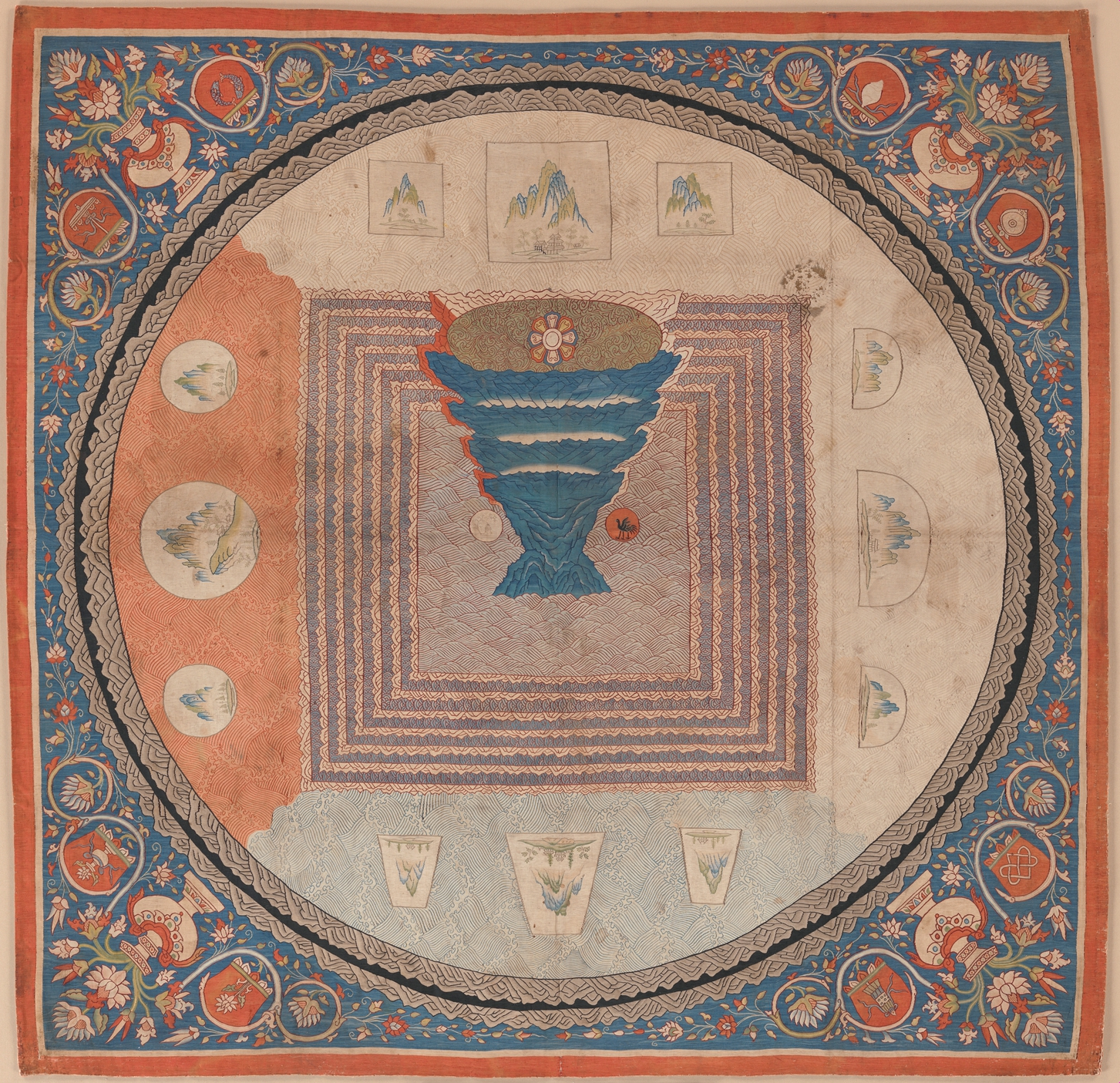
Cosmological mandala with Mount Meru, silk tapestry, China via The Metropolitan Museum of Art

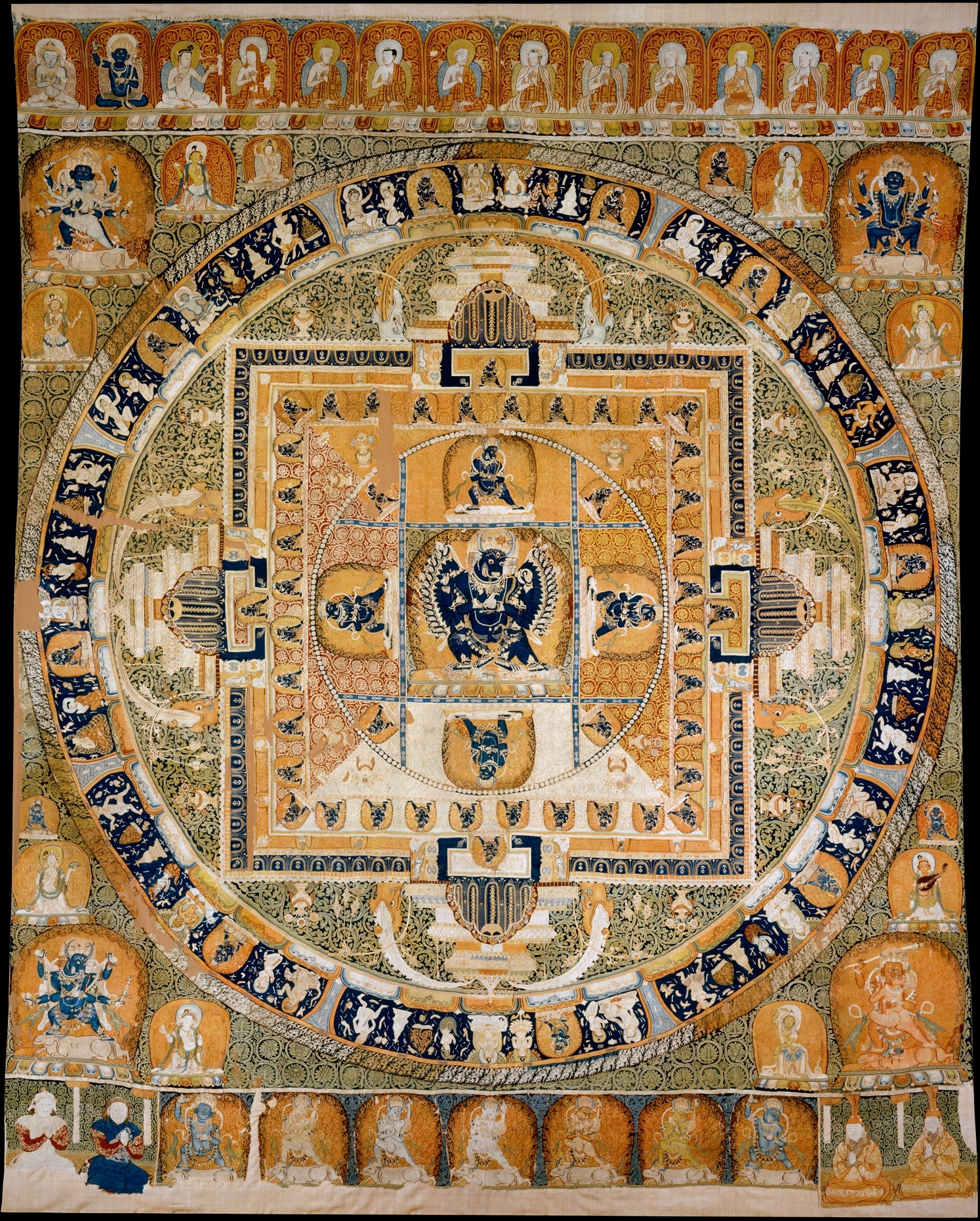
Vajrabhairava mandala, silk tapestry, China via The Metropolitan Museum of Art

A diagramic drawing of the Sri Yantra, showing the outside square, with four T-shaped gates, and the central circle

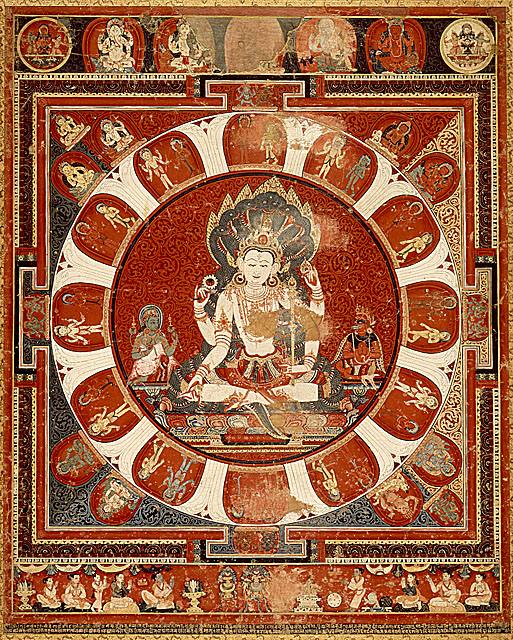
Vishnu Mandala(Traditionally found in Nepal)

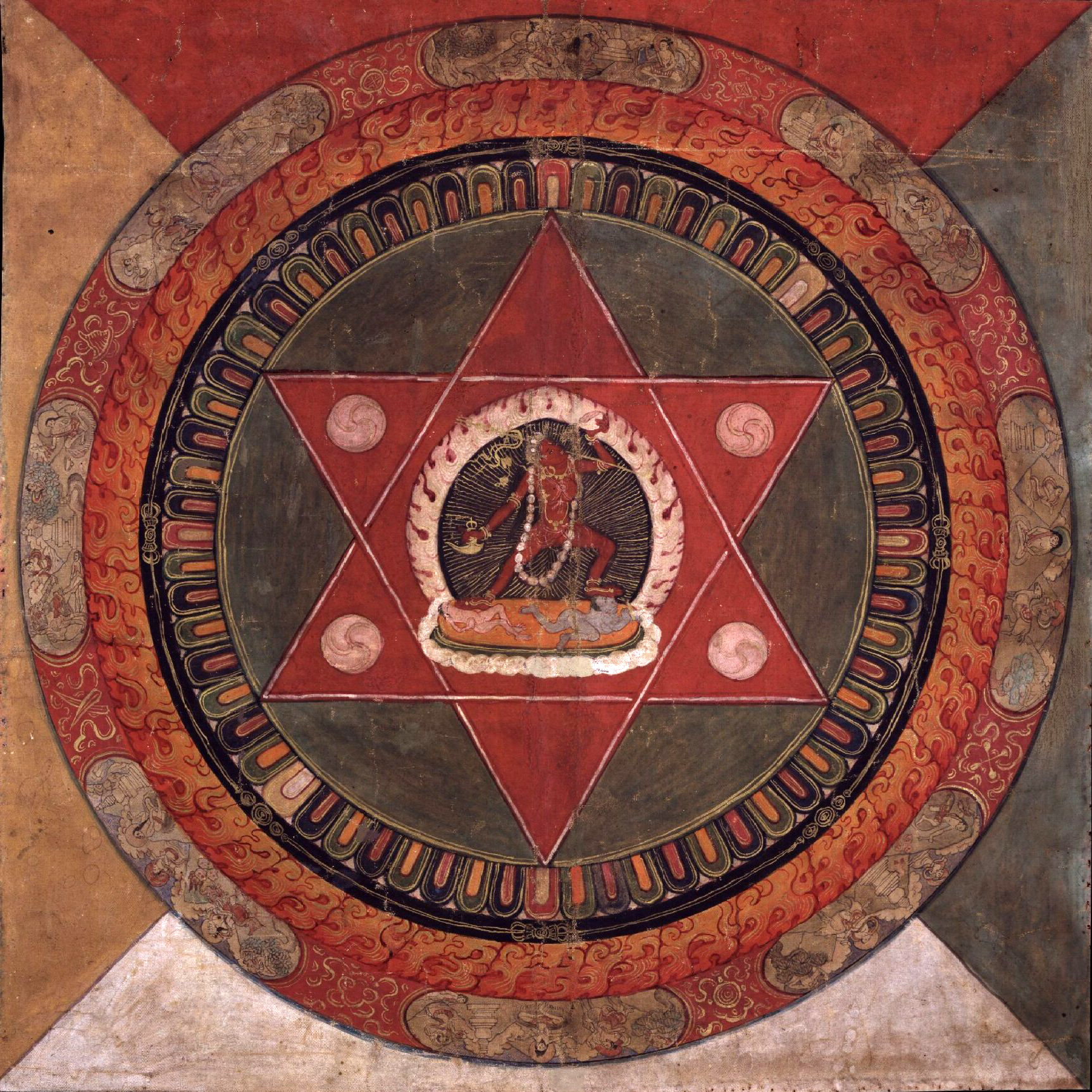
Painted 19th century Tibetan mandala of the Naropa tradition, Vajrayogini stands in the center of two crossed red triangles, Rubin Museum of Art

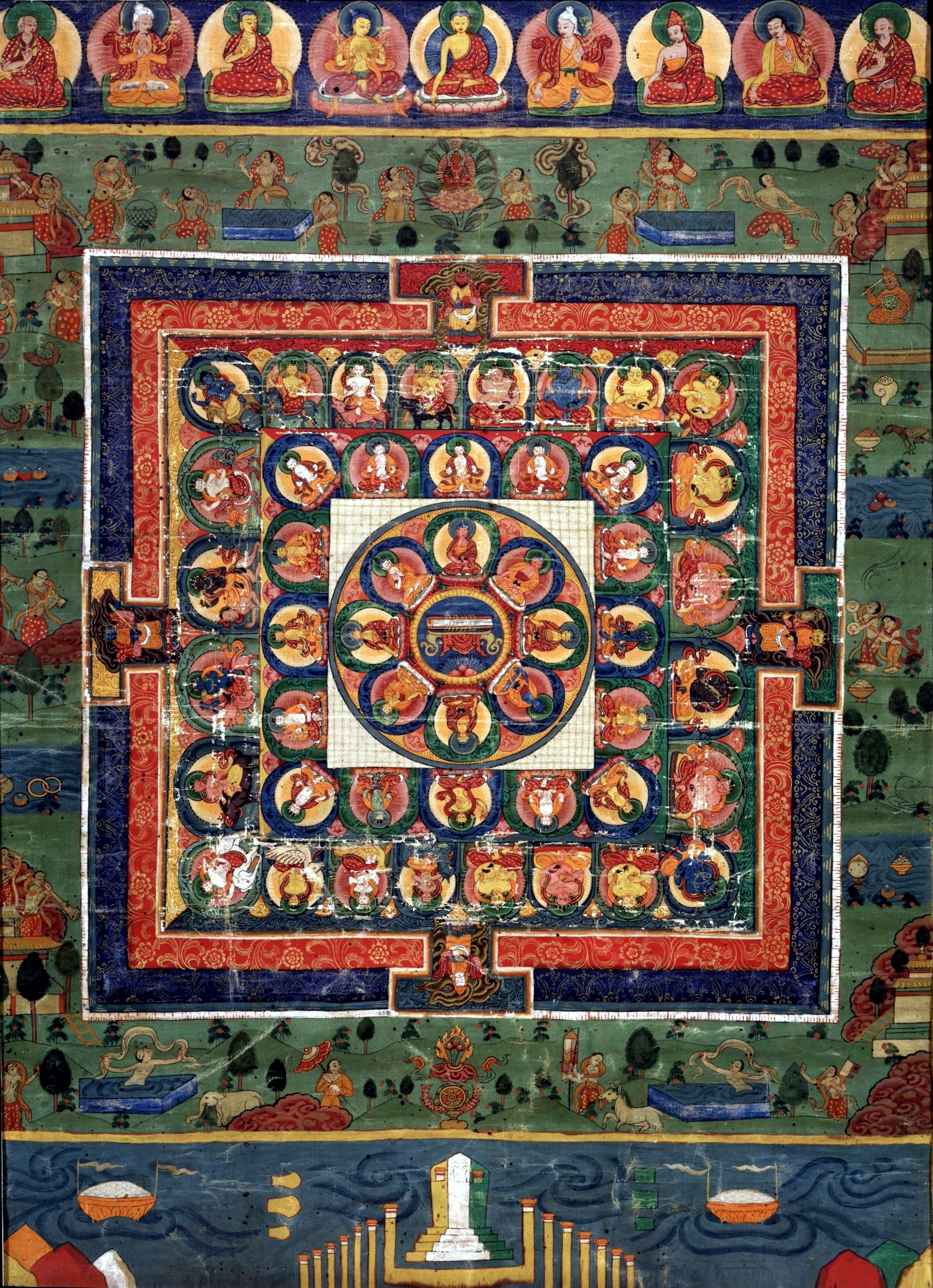
Painted Bhutanese Medicine Buddha mandala with the goddess Prajnaparamita in center, 19th century, Rubin Museum of Art

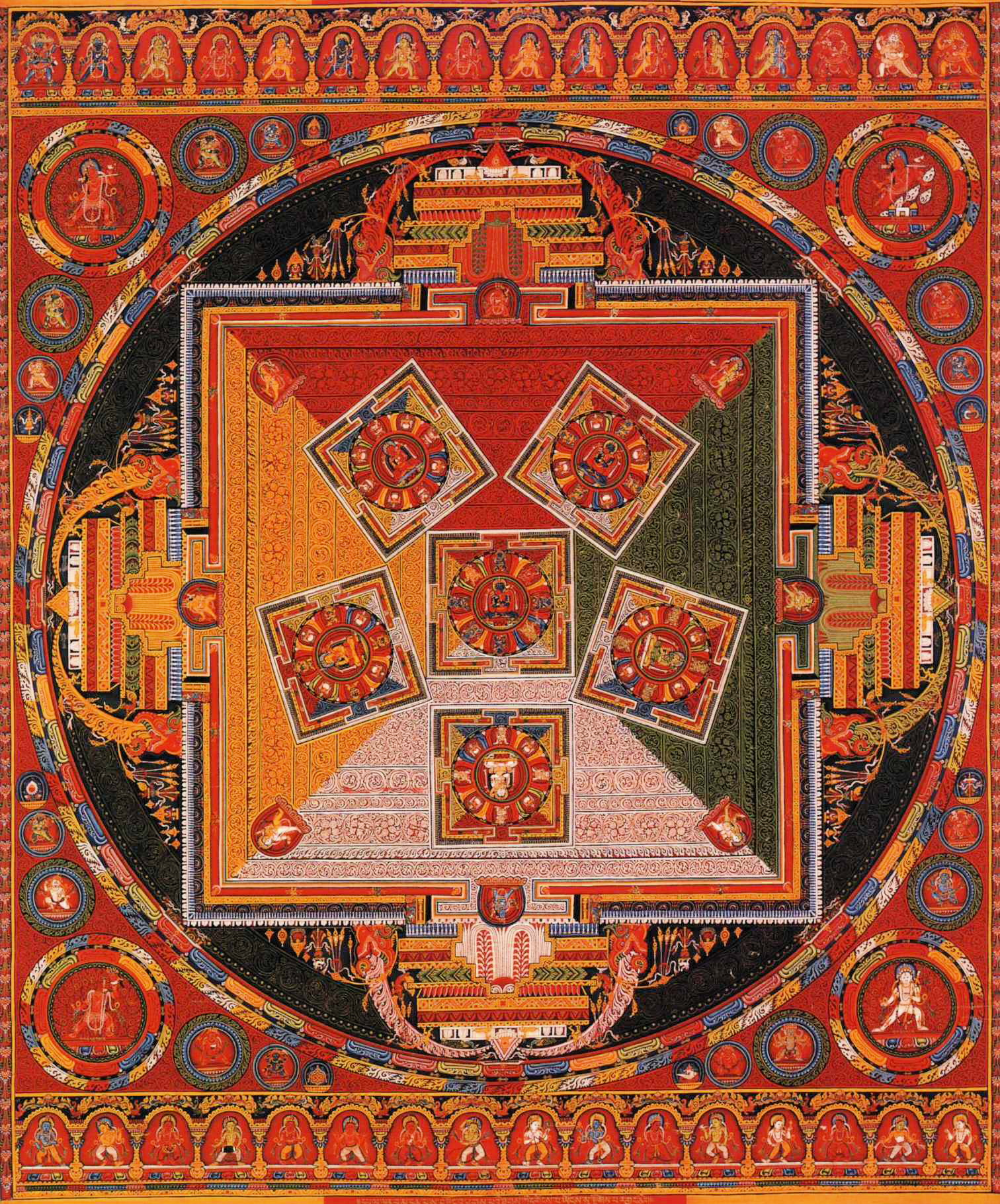
Mandala of the Six Chakravartins

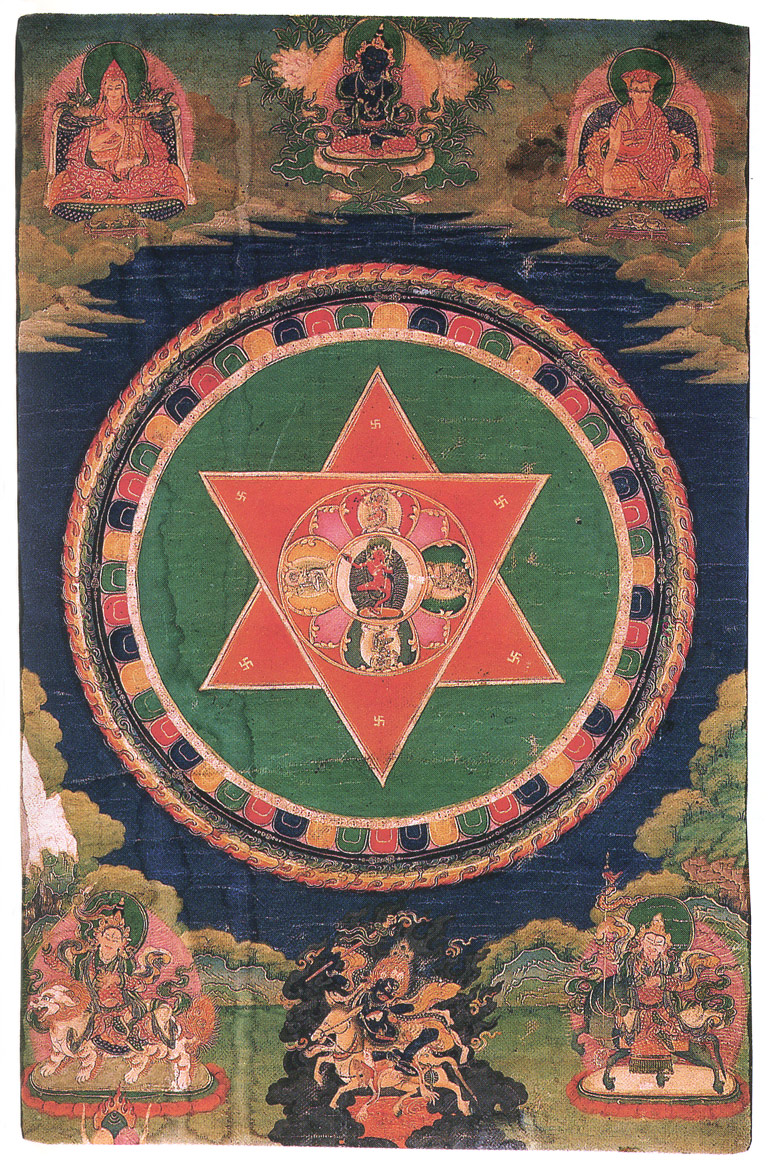
Vajravarahi mandala

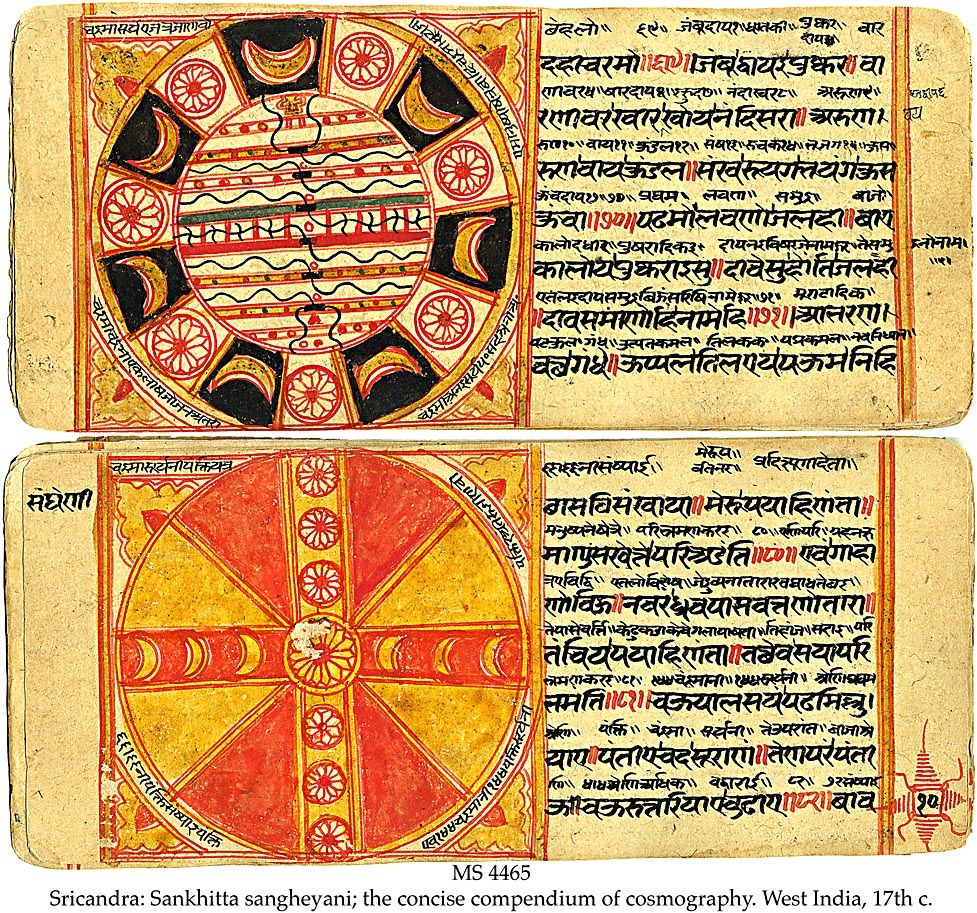
Jain cosmological diagrams and text.

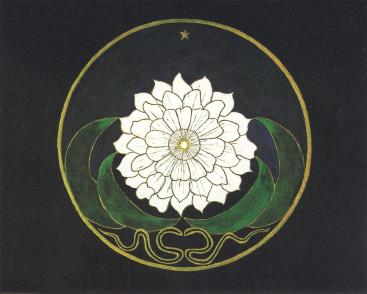
Mandala painted by a patient of Carl Jung

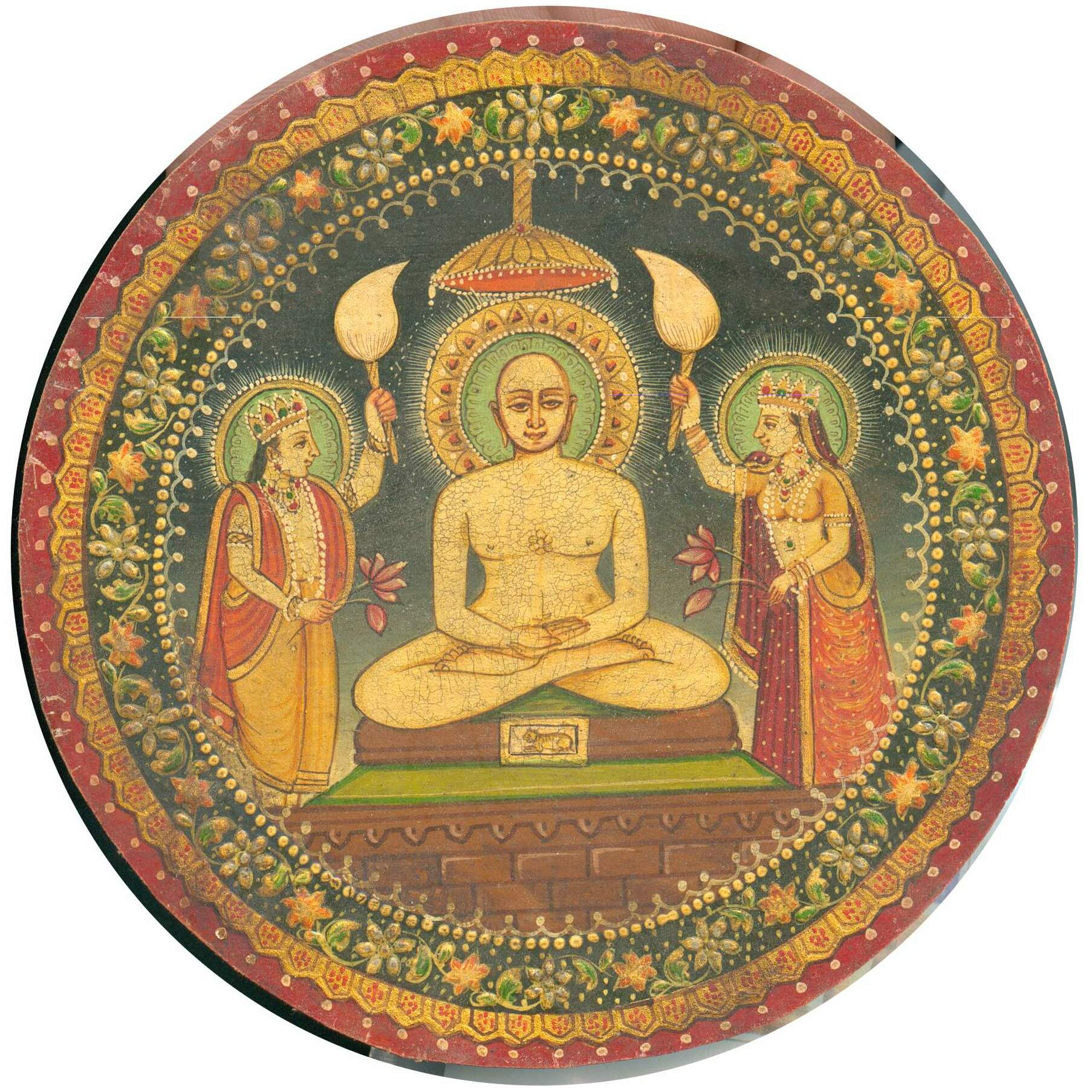
Jain picture of Mahavira

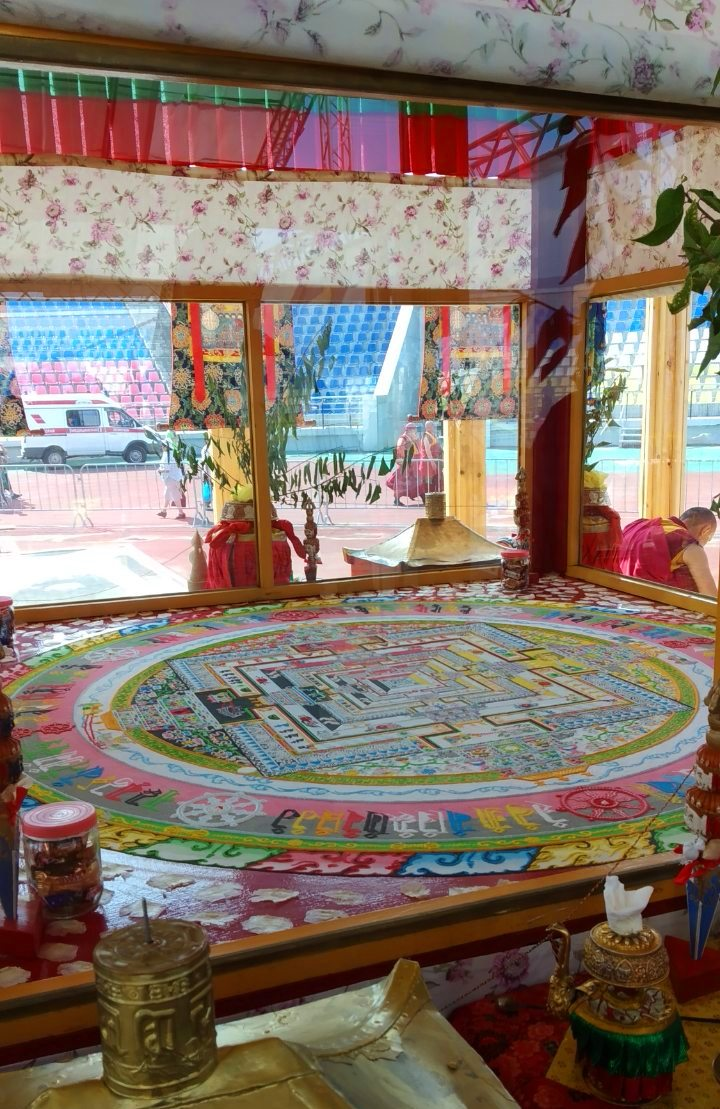
Kalachakra mandala in a special glass pavilion. Buddhist pilgrims bypass the pavilion in a clockwise direction three times. Buryatiya, July 16, 2019

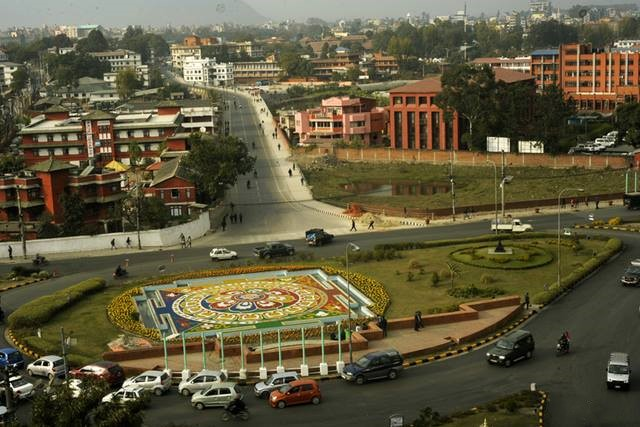
Mandala in Maitighar, Kathmandu, Nepal

== See also ==
- Architectural drawing – Technical drawing of a building or building project
- Astrological symbols – Symbols denoting astrological concepts
- Bhavacakra – Symbolic representation of cyclic existence
- Chakra – Centres of the subtle body
- Form constant – Recurringly observed geometric pattern
- Ganachakra – Tantric assemblies or feasts
- Great chain of being – Medieval Christian hierarchy of living beings
- Hilya – Artform and genre of Ottoman literature
- Ley line – Straight alignments between historic structures and landmarks
- Luoshu Square – Ancient Chinese diagram
- Magic circle – Protective device in ritual magic
- Mandylion – Painting of Jesus Christ's face
- Namkha – Tibetan form of yarn or thread cross
- Rangoli - art form originating from the Indian subcontinent
- Rose window – Circular window found in Gothic churches
- Shamsa – Intricately decorated rosette or medallion
- Shri Yantra – Form of mystical diagram used in the Shri Vidya school of Hinduism
- Sriramachakra – Device used in astrology in Tamil Nadu
- Tree of life (Kabbalah) – Diagram used in various mystical traditions
- Yantra – Mystical diagram in Tantric traditions

== General sources ==
- Brauen, M. (1997). The Mandala, Sacred circle in Tibetan Buddhism Serindia Press, London.
- Bucknell, Roderick & Stuart-Fox, Martin (1986). The Twilight Language: Explorations in Buddhist Meditation and Symbolism. Curzon Press: London. ISBN 0-312-82540-4
- Cammann, S. (1950). Suggested Origin of the Tibetan Mandala Paintings The Art Quarterly, Vol. 8, Detroit.
- Cowen, Painton (2005). The Rose Window, London and New York, (offers the most complete overview of the evolution and meaning of the form, accompanied by hundreds of colour illustrations.)
- Crossman, Sylvie and Barou, Jean-Pierre (1995). Tibetan Mandala, Art & Practice The Wheel of Time, Konecky and Konecky.
- Fontana, David (2005). "Meditating with Mandalas", Duncan Baird Publishers, London.
- Gold, Peter (1994). Navajo & Tibetan sacred wisdom: the circle of the spirit. Inner Traditions/Bear. ISBN 0-89281-411-X. Rochester, Vermont: Inner Traditions International.
- Mipham, Sakyong Jamgön (2002) 2000 Seminary Transcripts Book 1 Vajradhatu Publications ISBN 1-55055-002-0
- Somorjit, Wangam (2018). "World's Largest Mandalas from Manipur and Carl Jung's Archetype of the Self", neScholar, vol.04, Issue 01, ed.Dr. R.K. Nimai Singh ISSN 2350-0336
- Tucci, Giuseppe (1973). The Theory and Practice of the Mandala trans. Alan Houghton Brodrick, New York, Samuel Weisner.
- Vitali, Roberto (1990). Early Temples of Central Tibet London, Serindia Publications.
- Wayman, Alex (1973). "Symbolism of the Mandala Palace" in The Buddhist Tantras Delhi, Motilal Banarsidass.
