= Vairocana =

Celestial Buddha embodying emptiness

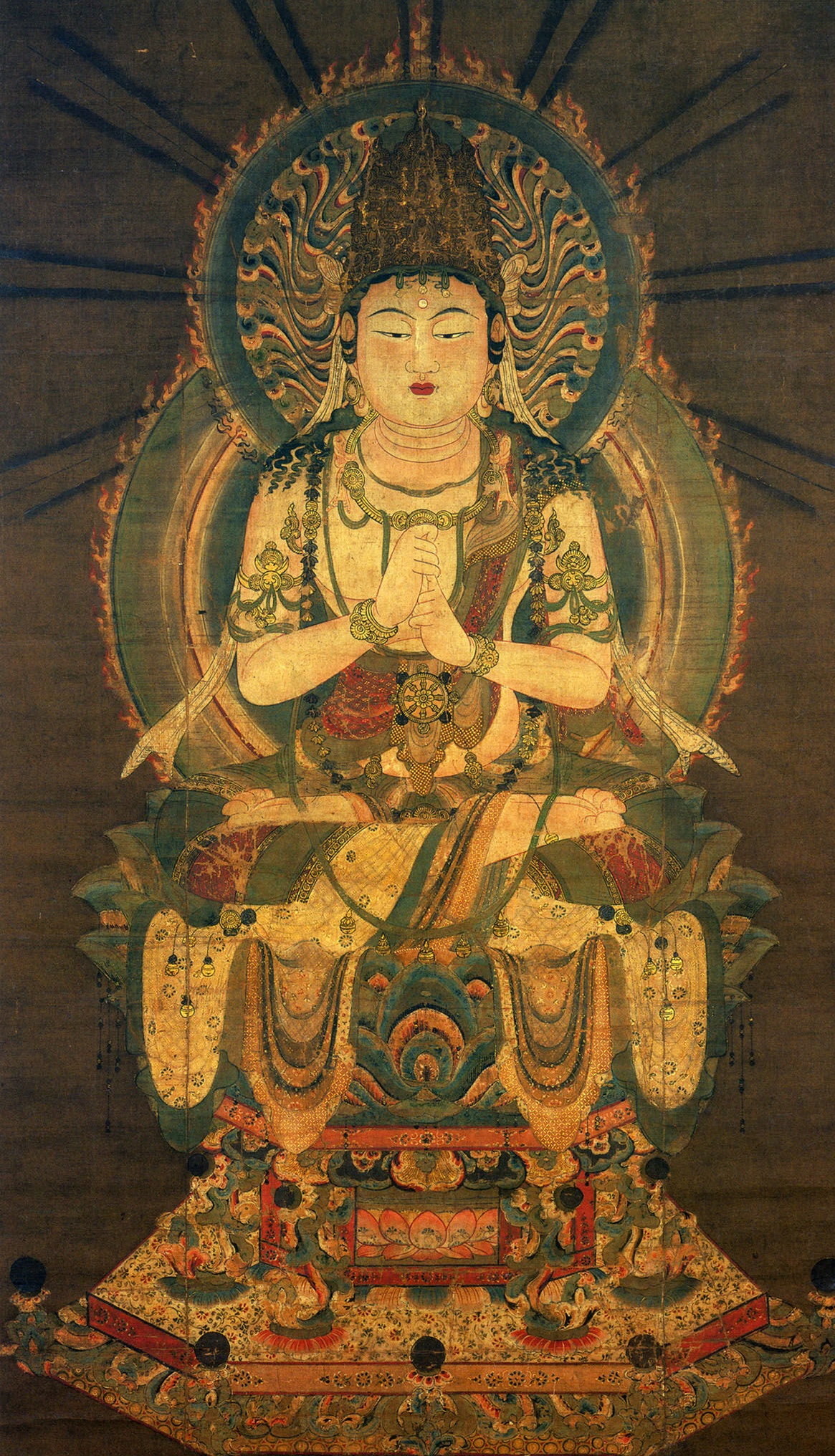
- A medieval Japanese painting of Vairocana of the Vajradhātu Maṇḍala forming the wisdom-fist mudra
- Sanskrit: वैरोचन; Vairocana
- Burmese: ဝေရောစန
- Chinese: 大日如來; Jyutping: Daai6 Jat6 Jyu4 Loi4; Pinyin: Dà Rì Rú Lái 毘盧遮那佛; Jyutping: Bei2 Lou4 Ze1 Naa5 Fat6; Pinyin: Pí Lú Zhē Nà Fó
- Indonesian: Wairocana
- Japanese: 大日如来(だいにちにょらい) romaji: Dainichi Nyorai 毘盧遮那仏(びるしゃなぶつ) romaji: Birushana Butsu
- Korean: 비로자나불 毘盧遮那佛; RR: Birojana Bul
- Mongolian: ᠪᠢᠷᠦᠵᠠᠨ᠎ ᠠ᠂ ᠮᠠᠰᠢᠳᠠ ᠭᠡᠢᠢᠭᠦᠯᠦᠨ ᠵᠣᠬᠢᠶᠠᠭᠴᠢ᠂ ᠭᠡᠭᠡᠭᠡᠨ ᠭᠡᠷᠡᠯᠲᠦ; Бярузана, Машид Гийгүүлэн Зохиогч, Гэгэгэн Гэрэлт; Biruzana, Masida Geyigülün Zohiyaghci, Gegegen Gereltü
- Thai: พระไวโรจนพุทธะ; RTGS: Phra wịrocana phuthṭha
- Tibetan: རྣམ་པར་སྣང་མཛད་ Wylie: rnam par snang mdzad THL: Nampar Nangdze
- Vietnamese: Đại Nhật Như Lai 大日如來; Tỳ Lư Xá Na 毘盧遮那; Tỳ Lô Giá Na Phật 毗盧遮那佛

Information
- Venerated by: Mahayana, Vajrayana
- Attributes: Śūnyatā

Vairocana ("The Sun", "Solar" or "Shining" in Sanskrit), also known as Mahāvairocana (Great Sun), also known as Paramabuddha is a major Buddha from Mahayana and Vajrayana Buddhism. He is often compared to the Sun, because both bestow their light impartially upon all beings. However, unlike the Sun, whose light can be blocked, and which disappears at night, Vairocana's light is seen by Buddhists as omnipresent, impossible to block, and shines eternally. Hence, he is called the "Great Sun". In East Asian Buddhism, Vairocana is called 大日如來 (lit. 'Great Sun Thus Come One') or 毘盧遮那佛 (lit. 'Vairocana Buddha').

In Mahayana and Vajrayana Buddhism, Vairocana is the Dharmakāya (lit. 'Dharma-body') of all Buddhas (the Dharma-body is the "true body" of all Buddhas, equivalent to the Ultimate Reality), which is formless, omnipresent, self-existent, eternal, indestructible, unable to be defiled, and is the source of all manifestations. The historical Gautama Buddha is one of the emanation bodies of Vairocana Buddha.

== Three Types of Bodies ==
According to the Three-Bodies teaching, every Buddha has three types of bodies, which are:

- Dharma Body – the true nature of all phenomena, the Ultimate Reality, visible only to those with the highest Awakenment, namely the Buddhas.
- Enjoyment Body – often of super-cosmic size and with supreme beauty, visible only to those whose Awakenment level is not lower than the first Bodhisattva stage.
- Emanation Body – physical forms projected into mundane worlds, visible to all common living beings.

In Mahayana Sutras, the name Vairocana can refer to both the Dharma-Body and Enjoyment-Body of Vairocana, while in Vajrayana, Vairocana represents the Dharma-Body which is identical to Dharma Realm, and sometimes the Dharma-Body and Enjoyment-Body of Vairocana are undifferentiated, Mahāvairocana is considered to be a Cosmic Buddha whose body is the entire universe.

Three Types of Bodies	Mahayana	Vajrayana	
Dharma Body	Vairocana	Vairocana	Vairocana
Enjoyment Body	Vairocana	Vairocana	Vairocana
Emanation Body	Sakyamuni Buddha	Sakyamuni Buddha	Sakyamuni Buddha

== Five Buddhas ==
Among the Five Buddhas of the Five Directions, Vairocana is the central figure, symbolizing both the source and destination of all the other four.

Five Directions	East	West	South	North	Center
Five Buddhas	Aksobhya Buddha	Amitabha Buddha	Ratna-sambhava Buddha	Amogha-siddhi Buddha	Vairocana Buddha
Five Families	Vajra Family	Padma (Lotus) Family	Ratna (Jewel) Family	Karma Family	Buddha Family
Five Elements	Water (Blue)	Fire (Red)	Earth (Yellow)	Wind (Green)	Space (White)
Five Wisdoms	Grand Round Mirror Wisdom (大圓鏡智)	Miraculous Observing Wisdom (妙觀察智)	Equality Wisdom (平等性智)	Achievement of actions Wisdom (成所作智)	Dharm Realm's body and nature Wisdom (法界體性智)
Five Wisdom Kings	Trailokyavijaya	Yamantaka	Kuṇḍali	Vajrayakṣa	Acala

Vairocana is not to be confused with Vairocana Mahabali, son of the asura Virochana, a character in the Yoga Vasistha. Vairocana Buddha is also not to be confused with another Buddha that appears in some Mahayana sources called "Rocana".

== Manifestations ==
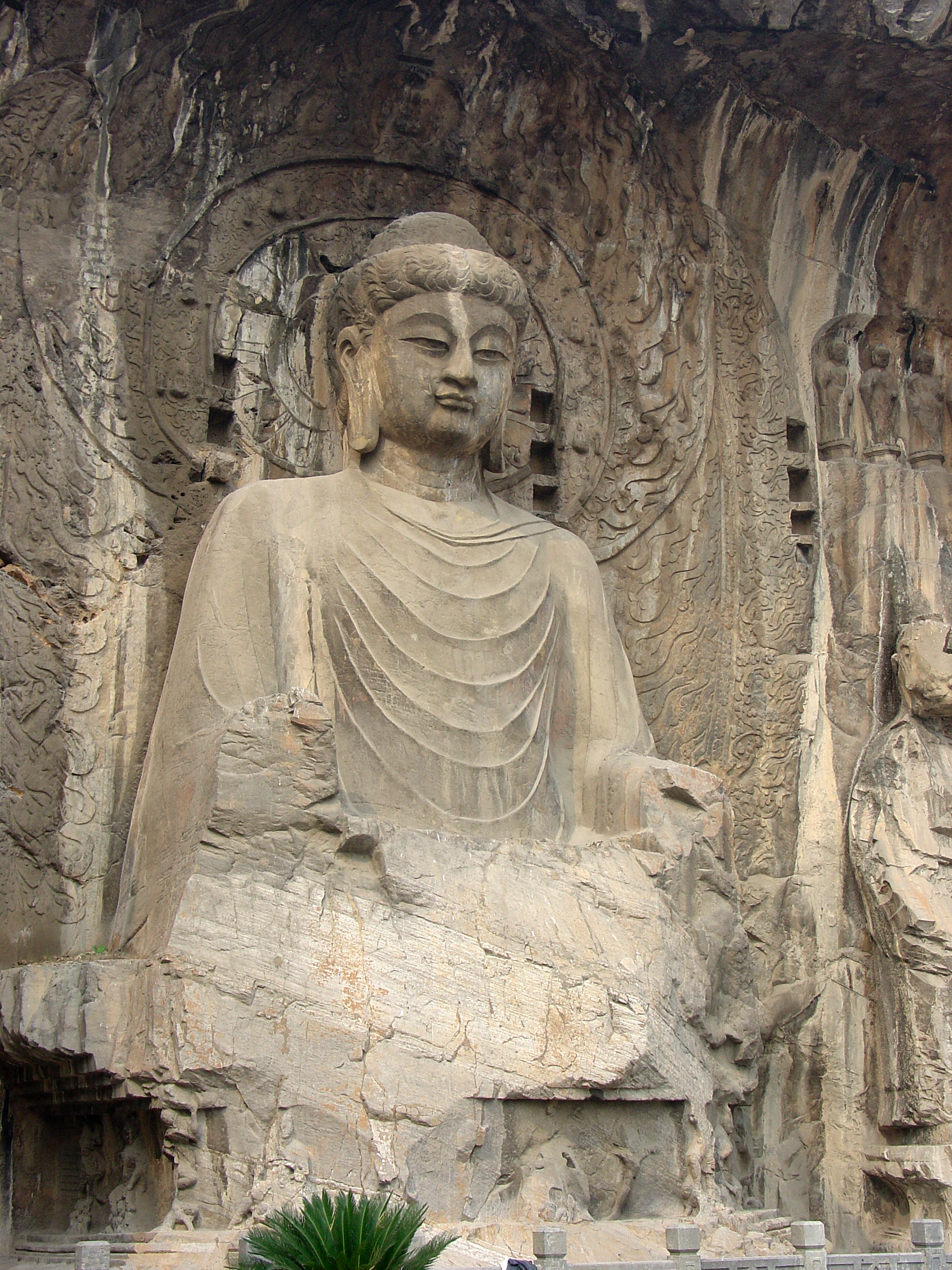
Tang dynasty statue of Vairocana Buddha in Dragon Gate Caves, China. The statue was completed in the year 676 and is 17.14 m high and has 2 m long ears.

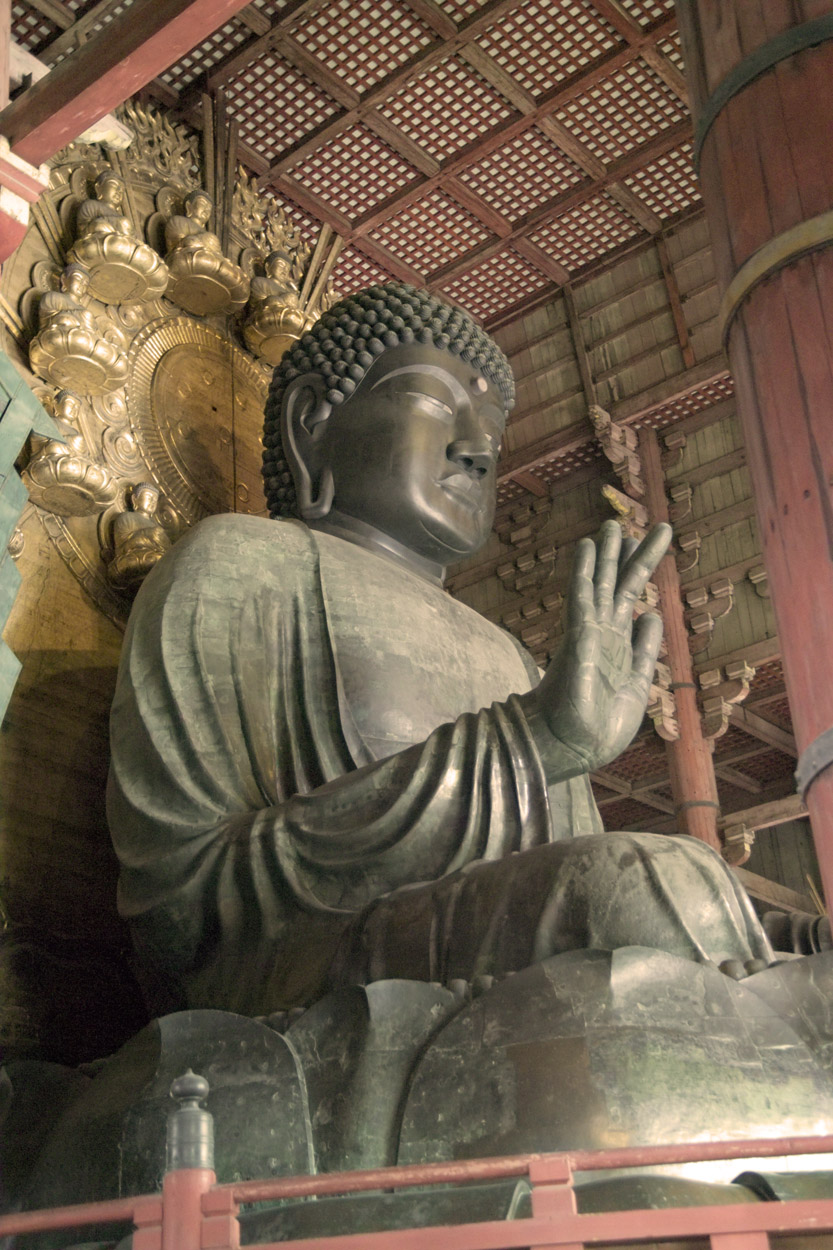
Statue of Vairocana Buddha in Tōdai-ji, Japan

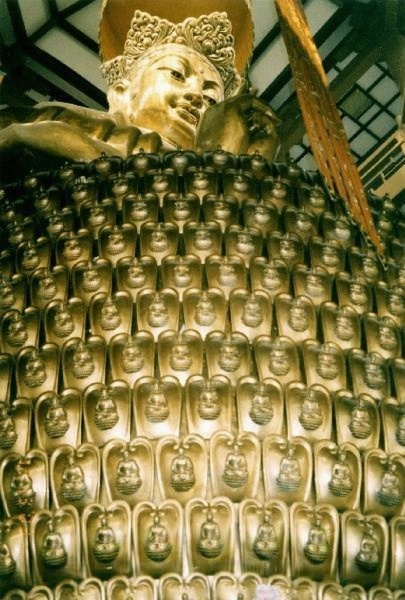
Vairocana Buddha forming Vairocana Mudra while sitting on a thousand-petaled throne, there is a Buddha on each petal of the throne. This is a demonstration of Vairocana's cosmic form and the cosmology of Avatamsaka Sutra.

Vajra Realm Vairocana	Vairocana from Vajra Realm Mandala is called Vajra Realm Vairocana (金剛界大日如來), depicted as sitting in lotus position while making the Wisdom-Fist Mudra (智拳印) with both hands. This form of Vairocana, as well as Womb Realm Vairocana, are widely seen in Japanese and Korean Buddhism.
Womb Realm Vairocana	Vairocana from Womb Realm Mandala is called Womb Realm Vairocana (胎藏界大日如來), sitting in lotus position with the Dharma Realm Dhyana Mudra (法界定印).
Vairocana with Vairocana Mudra	Vairocana Buddha with Vairocana Mudra (毗盧印) is a commonly seen manifestation of Vairocana in Chinese Buddhism.
Omniscient Vairocana	Omniscient Vairocana (Sanskrit: Sarvavid Vairocana) is a supreme manifestation of Vairocana seen in Tibetan Thangkas and some ancient Chinese temples. This form of Vairocana has four heads, sitting in lotus position with Dharma Realm Dhyana Mudra.
Vairocana with Dharma-Wheel Mudra	Vairocana with Dharma-Wheel Mudra (Sanskrit: Dharma-chakra Mudra) is a form of Vairocana often seen in Nepalese and Tibetan Buddhist artworks.
Immovable Wisdom King	Immovable Wisdom King (Sanskrit: Acala Vidyā-Rāja) is a wrathful form of Vairocana. "Immovable" refers to True Thusness which is eternally changeless while manifesting all phenomena of the universe.
Vairocana's cosmic form	Artworks demonstrating Vairocana's cosmic form or Dharma-Body can be found in some ancient Chinese temples. Some of these artworks display Vairocana's cosmic form as a multi-layered complex, forming a fractal-like structure to demonstrate the cosmology of wholeness taught by Avatamsaka Sutra.

== Overview ==
=== In Mahayana sutras ===
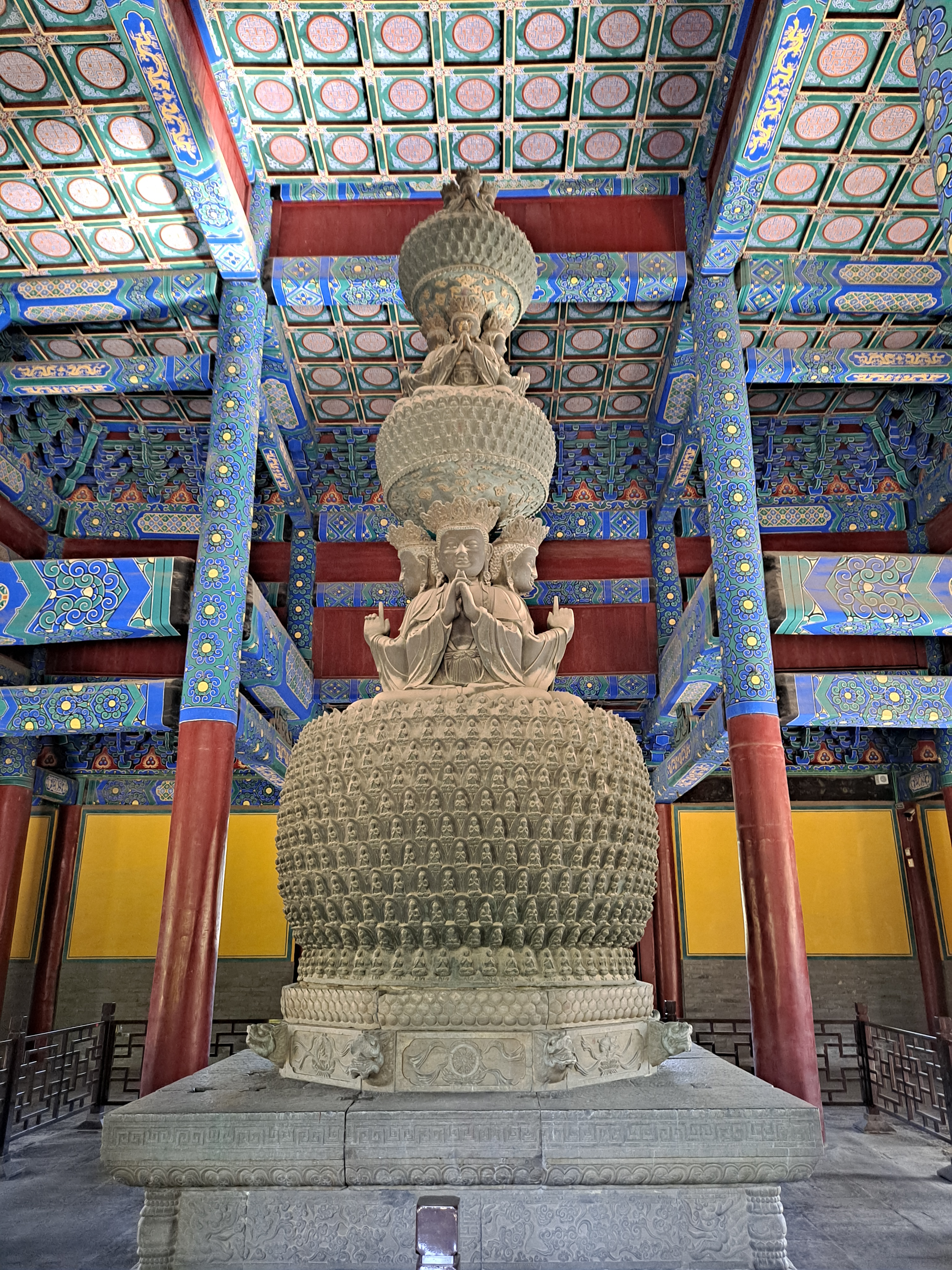
An ancient bronze found in Longxing Temple that demonstrates the cosmic form of Vairocana Buddha. The bronze has three layers, each with four large Vairocana Buddhas facing the four directions and sitting on countless emanation Buddhas (nirmanakayas). Such a layer repeats three times to display a fractal-like structure, demonstrating the three types of bodies (trikaya) of Vairocana and the cosmology of wholeness taught by Avatamsaka Sutra.

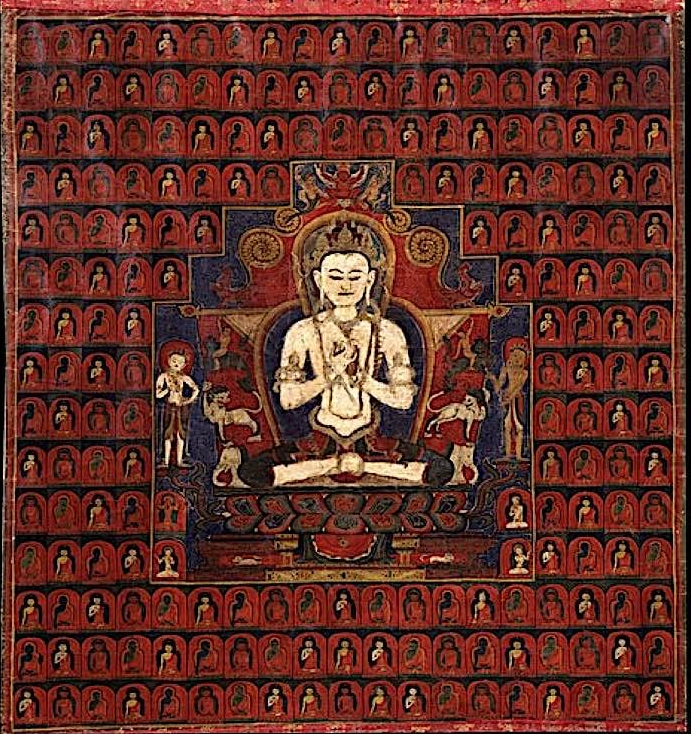
Vairocana Buddha, surrounded by countless Buddhas emanated from him

Vairocana ("Radiance" or "The Illuminator") is introduced in the Brahmajāla Sūtra (traditional Chinese: 梵網經; pinyin: Fànwǎng jīng), which states:

Now, I, Vairocana Buddha am sitting atop a lotus pedestal; On a thousand flowers surrounding me are a thousand Shakyamuni Buddhas. Each flower supports a thousand million worlds or Great Trichiliocosm; in each world a Shakyamuni Buddha appears. All are seated beneath a Bodhi-tree, all simultaneously attain Buddhahood. All these innumerable Buddhas have Vairocana as their original body.

In the Buddhāvataṃsaka Sūtra, Vairocana is described as having attained enlightenment immeasurable eons ago and residing in a world purified by him while he was a bodhisattva. He also presides over an assembly of countless other bodhisattvas. The Buddhāvataṃsaka also sees Vairocana as a supreme cosmic Buddha who contains all world systems within his all-encompassing cosmic body. The Avatamsaka sutra also states that the wisdom of the Buddha (the Tathagata) is present everywhere in the universe; indeed, it is present within every living being. Thus, the sutra states (in chapter 32, Manifestation of the Tathagata):

Son of Buddha, the wisdom of Tathagata is present everywhere. Why? Son of Buddha, in the class of living beings there is no place where the wisdom of Tathagata is not present. Why is it that? The wisdom of Tathagata is not established due to grasping the discrimination/consciousness, because the omniscient wisdom, the self-existent wisdom and the non-obstructed wisdom perfectly appear in total disconnection with discrimination.

According to Paul Williams, the Buddha "is said or implied at various places in this vast and heterogeneous sutra to be the universe itself, to be the same as 'absence of intrinsic existence' or emptiness, and to be the Buddha's all-pervading omniscient awareness." The very body of Vairocana is also seen as a reflection of the whole universe:

The body of [Vairocana] Buddha is inconceivable. In his body are all sorts of lands of sentient beings. Even in a single pore are countless, immeasurable vast oceans.

According to the Buddhāvataṃsaka Sūtra, the whole universe is a vast pure buddha-field which has been purified by Vairocana. This is the view of the Pure Land found in the Chinese Huayan tradition. According to this view, our world is just one small part of this universal Pure Land, which is named: "Ocean of worlds, whose surface and inside are decorated with an arrangement of flowers" (Sanskrit: Kusumatalagarbha-vyūhālamkāra-lokadhātusamudra). It is also called the "Lotus Treasury World" (Chinese: 華蔵世界, Skt. Padmagarbha-lokadhātu), since it is an array of billions of buddha-lands (Skt. buddhakṣetra) located in a massive lotus flower shape.

In the cosmology of the Avatamsaka sutra, our Universe is just one of the immeasurable number of universes in a Multiverse called "Ocean of worlds, whose surface and inside are decorated with an arrangement of flowers" (Kusumatalagarbha-vyuhalamkara-lokadhatu-samudra). The Avatamsaka states that this entire cosmos has been purified by the Buddha Vairocana through his bodhisattva practices for countless aeons, after having met countless Buddhas. The sutra also states that our world is in Vairocana's buddhafield. Vairocana is closely associated with Shakyamuni Buddha; in some cases, he is even identified with him in the Avatamsaka Sutra. Huayan generally sees Shakyamuni as an emanation body (nirmanakaya) from the ultimate Buddha Vairocana ("The Illuminator").

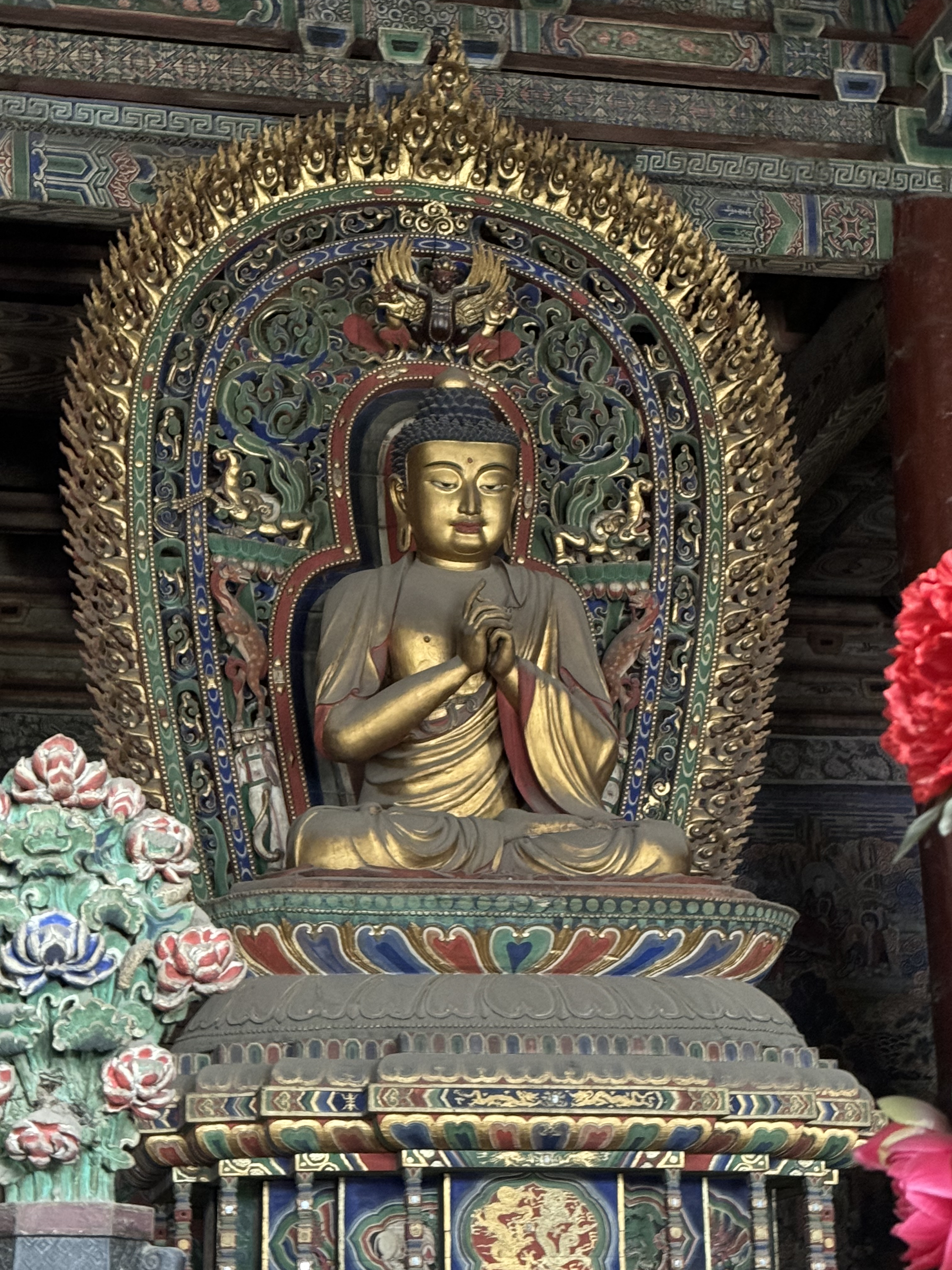
Ming dynasty (1368–1644) statue of Vairocana in Huayan Temple in Shanxi, China, one out of a set depicting the Five Tathāgatas

In the Śūraṅgama mantra (Chinese: 楞嚴咒; pinyin: Léngyán Zhòu) taught in the Śūraṅgama sutra (Chinese: 楞嚴經; pinyin: Léngyán Jīng), an especially influential dharani in the Chinese Chan tradition, Vairocana is mentioned to be the host of the Buddha Division in the centre, one of the five major divisions which dispels the vast demon armies of the five directions.

Vairocana is the central Buddha of numerous esoteric sutras (sometimes also called tantras), and he appears in sutras like the Vairocanābhisaṃbodhi Sūtra (Vairocana's Awakening), the Vajrasekhara Sutra (Vajra Peak) and the Tattvasaṃgraha Tantra (Summation of Essential Principles).

Helen Hardacre, writing on the Mahavairocana Tantra, comments that Mahavairocana's virtues are deemed to be immanently universal within all beings: "The principle doctrine of the Dainichikyo is that all the virtues of Dainichi (Mahāvairocana) are inherent in us and in all sentient beings."

=== Relationship with Śākyamuni ===
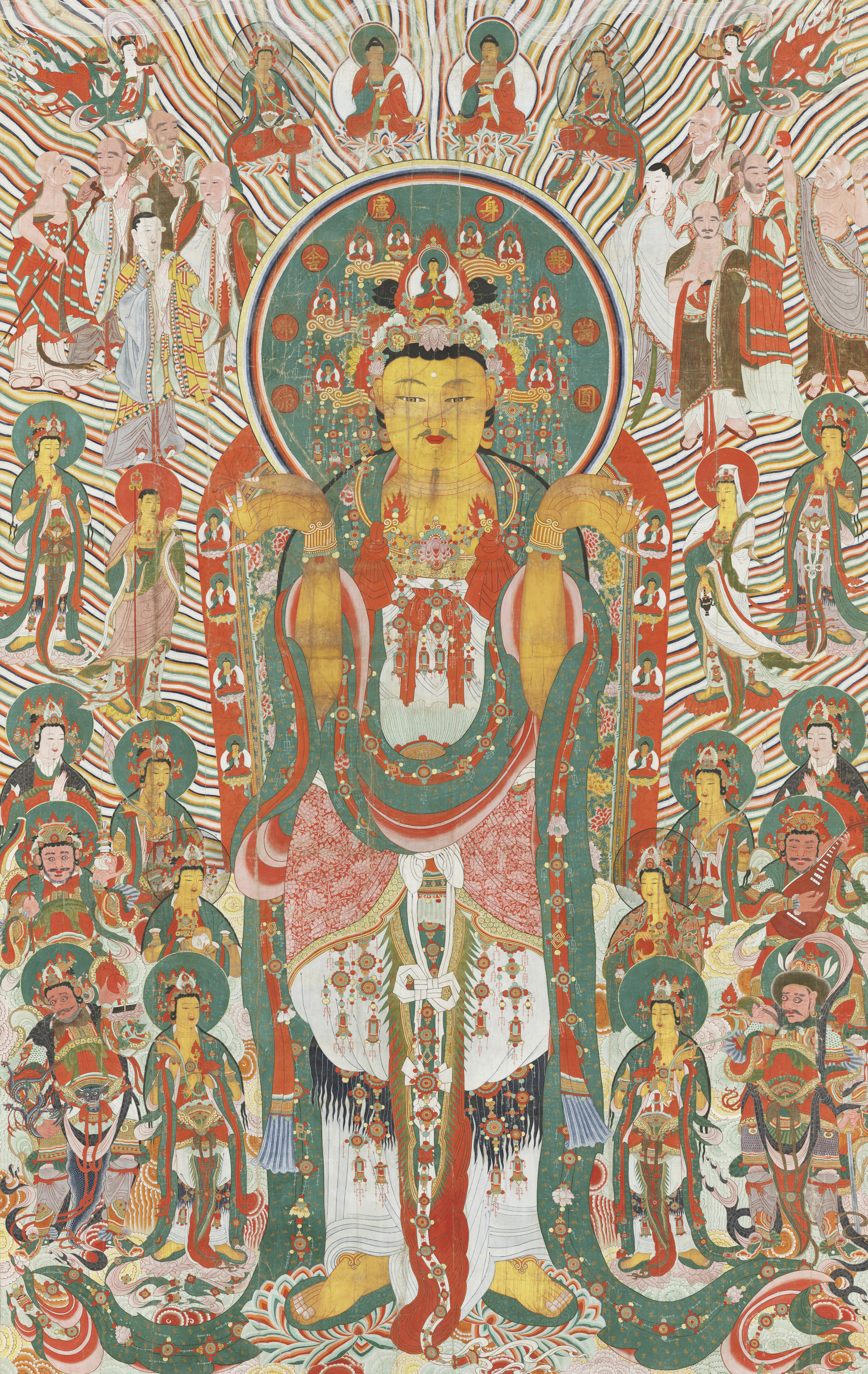
Hanging Painting of Vairocana at Sinwonsa temple in Gongju, Korea

In the Buddhāvataṃsakasūtra, Śākyamuni Buddha is a magical emanation (nirmāṇakāya) of the cosmic Buddha Vairocana. Vairocana is certainly seen as a more cosmic and transcendent existence of Śākyamuni, who came to be seen as Vairochana's earthly manifestation. Similarly, the Brahmajala Sutra also states that Śākyamuni was originally named Vairocana, regarding the former as a physical incarnation (nirmāṇakāya) of the latter.

Vairocana is also mentioned as an epithet of Śākyamuni Buddha in the Samantabhadra Meditation Sutra (part of the Threefold Lotus Sutra). Thus, in Tiantai and Tendai, Vairocana is seen as synonymous with the Original Buddha of the Lotus Sutra's 16th chapter. The Samantabhadra Meditation Sutra states:

Śākyamuni is called Vairocana, who pervades all places. This Buddha's abode is called Eternally Quiescent Light: a place which is comprised of the Pāramitā of Permanence (nitya-pāramitā); a place which is established on the Pāramitā of Self (ātma-pāramitā); a place [where] the Pāramitā of Purity (śuddha-pāramitā) extinguishes the characteristics of existence; a place [where] the Pāramitā of Bliss (sukha-pāramitā)[leads to] the non-abiding of the characteristics of body and mind. It is a place [wherein] the existence or non-existence of the characteristics of all dharmas is not perceived. It is like the quiescence of liberation (i.e., nirvāṇa) and the culmination of the Prajñā Pāramitā because the phenomena (rūpa) there are permanently abiding dharmas; in like manner, you should contemplate the Buddhas of the ten directions.

=== In East Asian Buddhism ===
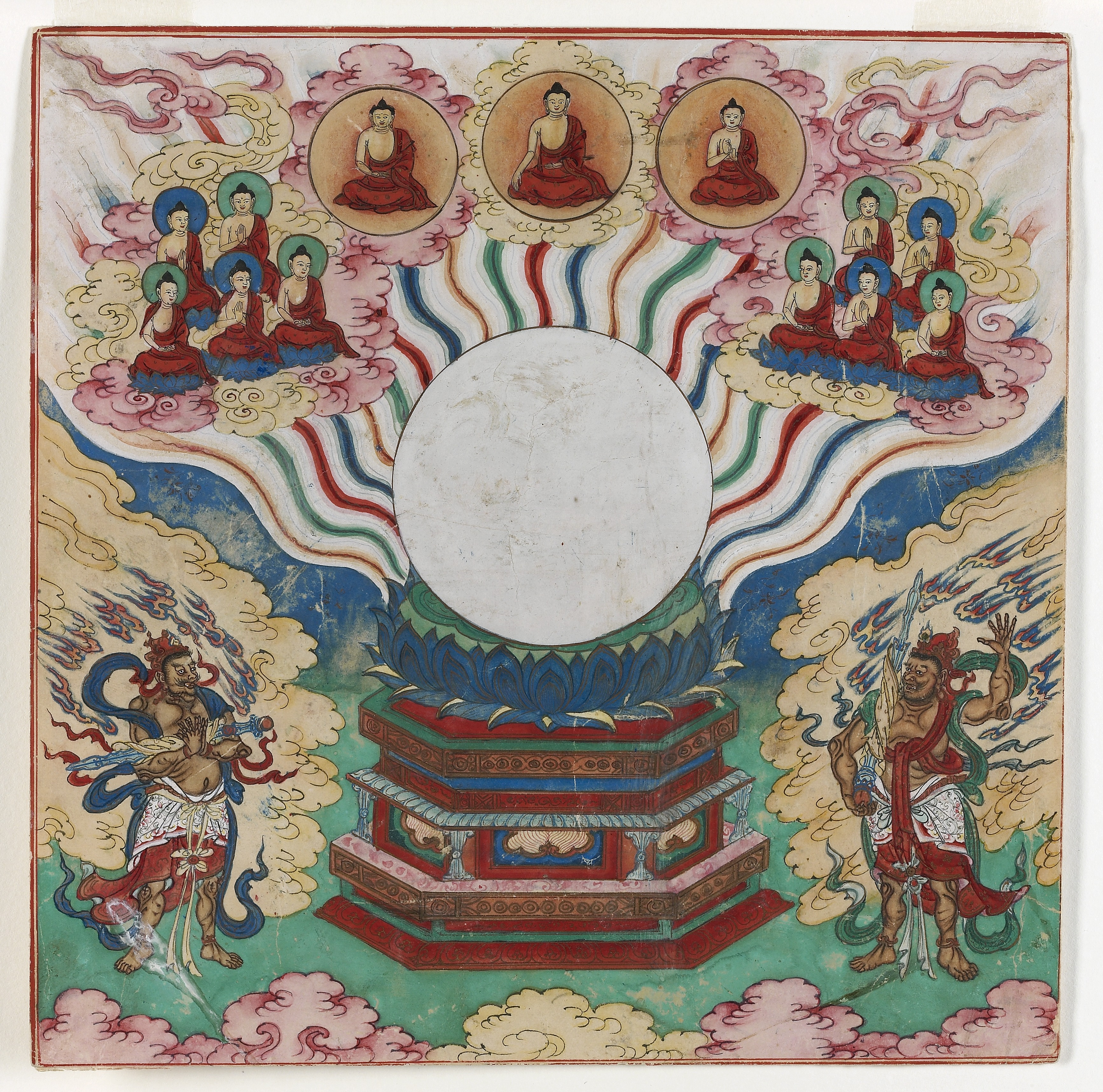
Aniconic representation of the Dharmakaya "Sarvavid Vairocana" as a moon disc atop an enthroned blue lotus, Qing Dynasty (18th century)

Vairocana is the Original Buddha (本佛 běnfó, Jp. honbutsu) in the Chinese Buddhist schools of Tiantai, Huayan and Chinese Esoteric Buddhism, as well as in the Japanese traditions of Kegon, Shingon and Tendai. In Huayan Buddhism, the entire universe is understood as the very body of Vairocana, a supreme cosmic reality. Vairocana is infinite; his influence and light are limitless, pervading the entire universe. Furthermore, Vairocana is really the ultimate principle (li), the Dharmakaya, Suchness and "the substance underlying phenomenal reality". However, while Vairocana, as the ultimate principle, is eternal, it also transforms and changes according to the needs and conditions of sentient beings. Furthermore, Vairocana is empty, interdependent, and interfused with all phenomena in the universe. Thus, Vairocana is both immanent (due to its dependent and interfused character) and transcendent (as the immutable basis of all things).

According to Fazang, while the nirmanakaya Shakyamuni taught the other Mahayana sutras, Vairocana teaches the Avatamsaka Sutra through his ten bodies which are: the All-Beings Body, the Lands Body, the Karma Body, the Śrāvakas Body, the Pratyekabuddha Body, the Bodhisattvas Body, the Tathāgatas Body, the Wisdom Body, the Dharma Body, and the Space Body. Fazang sees these ten bodies as encompassing all phenomena (animate and inanimate) in the "three realms", i.e., the entire universe.

In Chinese and Japanese Buddhism, Vairocana was gradually superseded as an object of reverence by the popularity of Amitābha, due in large part to the increasing popularity of Pure Land Buddhism, but veneration of Vairocana still remains popular among adherents and remains a central object of devotion in Tendai, Shingon, and the Huayan schools.

During the initial stages of his mission in Japan, the Catholic missionary Francis Xavier was welcomed by the Shingon monks since he used Dainichi, the Japanese name for Vairocana, to designate the Christian God. As Xavier learned more about the religious nuances of the word, he substituted the term Deusu, which he derived from the Latin and Portuguese Deus.

=== Relationship with Amitabha ===
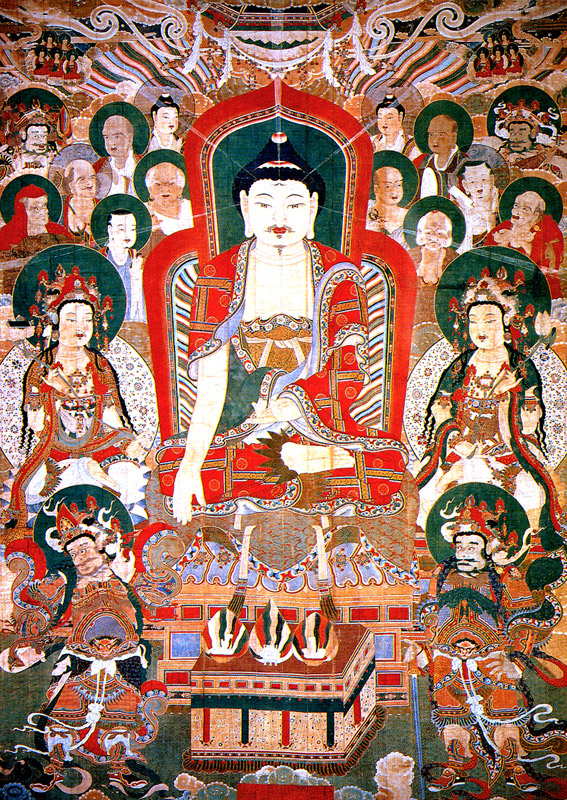
A painting of Vairocana at Hwaeomsa

The Shingon monk Dōhan regarded the two great Buddhas, Amitābha and Vairocana, as one and the same Dharmakāya Buddha and as the true nature at the core of all beings and phenomena. There are several realizations that can accrue to the Shingon practitioner of which Dōhan speaks in this connection, as James Sanford points out:

[T]here is the realization that Amida is the Dharmakaya Buddha, Vairocana; then there is the realization that Amida as Vairocana is eternally manifest within this universe of time and space; and finally there is the innermost realization that Amida is the true nature, material and spiritual, of all beings, that he is 'the omnivalent wisdom-body, that he is the unborn, unmanifest, unchanging reality that rests quietly at the core of all phenomena".

The identification of Vairocana with Amitābha can also be seen in the Huayan school. During the Qing dynasty, Huayan figures like Peng Shaosheng (1740–1796) also equated Amitābha Buddha with Vairocana. According to Peng, Vairocana and Amitabha are actually the same Buddha, Amitabha's pure land of Sukhavati is the same as Vairocana Buddha's Lotus Treasury World. Peng saw the Huayan principle of the interpenetration of principle and phenomena as indicating that these Buddhas and their pure lands were mutually interfused and non-dual with all worlds in the universe.

== Mantras and dharanis ==
Numerous mantras, seed syllables and dhāraṇī are associated with Vairocana Buddha.

A common basic mantra is the following:

Oṃ Vairocana Vaṃ

=== Mantra of Light ===
A popular mantra associated with Vairocana in both the Chinese Buddhist and Japanese Buddhist traditions is the Mantra of Light (光明真言, pinyin: guāngmíng zhēnyán, rōmaji: kōmyō shingon; Sanskrit: prabhāsa-mantra), alternatively (毗盧遮那如來所說不空大灌頂光真言, pinyin: pílúzhēnà rúlái ruǒshuō bukōng dà guàndǐng guāng zhēnyán).

==== Chinese Buddhism ====
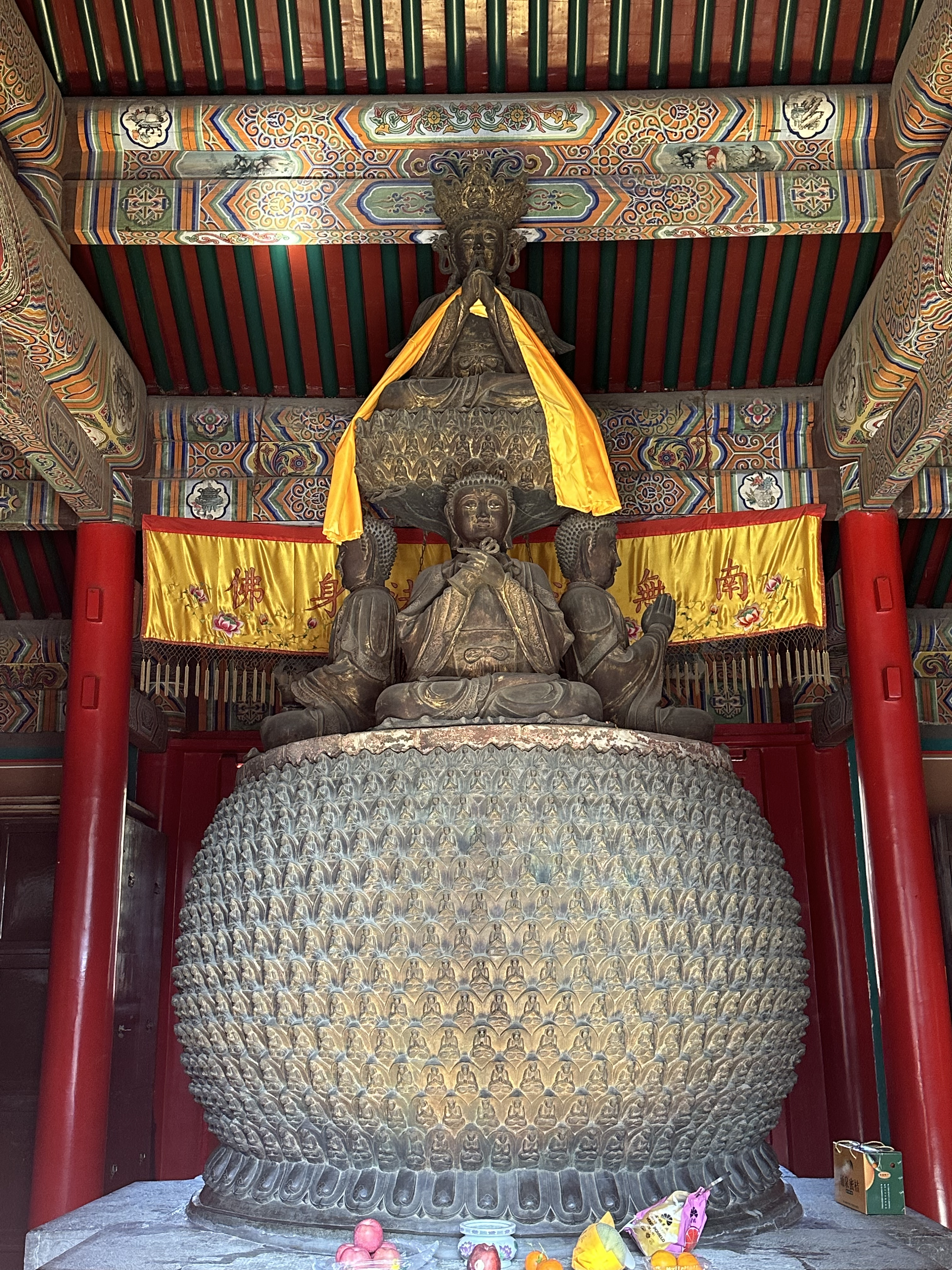
Ming dynasty (1368–1644) bronze statue of Vairocana at Fayuan Temple in Beijing, China. Similar to the example from Longxing Temple, this statue symbolizes the all-pervasive nature of Vairocana Buddha along with his numerous manifestation Buddhas (nirmanakayas).

In Chinese Buddhism, one primary usage of the mantra since the Song dynasty has been in regular ritual services carried out by monastics. For instance, an early reference to the mantra is found in the Lebang wenlei (樂邦文類) by Zongxiao's (1151–1214), which discusses how the Tiantai monk Zhiyuan 智圓 (976–1022) in the Song Dynasty (960–1279) used the mantra on sand to attempt to save his deceased mother. Another key example of the mantra's employment in Chinese Buddhism is found in the manual Baizhang qinggui zhengyi ji (百丈清規證義記; lit: "Baizhang's Pure Rules for Large Chan Monasteries with Orthodox Commentary"), which is a summary of general mainstream monastic vinaya rules in Chinese Buddhist temples within China compiled during the late Qing dynasty (1644–1912). In the subsection detailing the ritual for celebrating Śākyamuni Buddha's Birthday (釋迦佛誕; Shìjiā Fó dàn), the manual states that the ritual's participants should chant the Mantra of Light seven times in front of a statue of the infant Buddha before bathing the statue of the Buddha with water (浴佛 Yùfó).

Most notably, the mantra is commonly used during the Shuilu Fahui ceremony (水陸法會), an elaborate, multi-day ritual that was first compiled during the Northern and Southern dynasties period and subsequently further extended during the Song, Ming and Qing dynasties. During the Shuilu Fahui ceremony, all enlightened and unenlightened beings in saṃsāra are invoked and invited to attend and partake in the physical and spiritual nourishment provided. In the most widely used version of the liturgy for the ceremony, the Shuilu fahui yigui ben (水陸儀軌會本), the Mantra of Light is recited seven times in succession by the officiating monastics while setting up the inner altar during a specific subsection where Vairocana is invoked into the ritual space. Today, the mantra and the liturgy remains in use during Shuilu Fahui ceremonies, which continues to be one of the most popular Chinese Buddhist rituals in contemporary times.

In addition, the mantra is also traditionally grouped as one of the "Four Great Blessings" (四大祝延) or "Praises of Blessings" (祝延讚), which is a quartet of mantras and prayers consisting of the Mantra of Light, the "Oṃ maṇi padme hūm̐" mantra, the Dhāraṇī of the Holy Tathāgata of Immeasurable Lifespan, King of Determined Radiance as well as a prayer for the health and longevity of the emperor (which has been updated in modern times to pray for the head of state instead). When considered within this grouping, the Mantra of Light is usually referred to by its first few syllables "Ong Amujia" (唵 阿穆伽), and its transliteration in most common Chinese liturgical texts such as the Chanmen Risong (禪門日誦; lit: "Daily Recitations of the Chan Gate") and the Fomen Bibei (佛門必備, lit: "Essentials of the Buddhist Gate") is transliteration version 3 in the Mantra section above, with only minor differences between texts. In modern times, the "Four Great Blessings", inclusive of the Mantra of Light, continue to be recited by monastics during events such as the Buddha's birthday and during retreats.

==== Japanese Buddhism ====
In Japan, the mantra was introduced by Kukai, who brought over a copy of Amoghavajra's sutra from China in the 9th century, although there are no records that he ever utilized it in tantric practices. Records show gradually increasing use in the Heian Period (794–1185). Some of the earliest reports of the regular use of the mantra come from 10th century Tendai societies on Mount Hiei, specifically that of the Twenty-Five Samādhi Assembly (二十五三昧会, Nijūgo zanmai e), which included the monk Genshin and focused on birth in Amitābha's pure land.

In the 13th century, the Mantra of Light was widely popularized by the monk Myōe (1173–1232), and later by Shingon monks Eison and Ninshō in their ministries. Myōe famously taught the Mantra of Light as a way to purify bad karma and to achieve birth in Sukhavati (or other pure lands if one wished), seeing it as an alternative to the nembutsu. He even wrote a work on it, Recommending Faith in the Sand of the Mantra of Light (光明真言土砂勸信記, Kōmyō shingon dosha kanjinki). He recommended the mantra widely to his followers, especially to laypersons. Eison (1201–1290) is known for convening "Mantra of Light Assemblies" at Saidaiji, which were joined by male and female monastics and laypersons who took the eight precepts for seven days and recited the Mantra of Light. Both the Mantra and the nembutsu were often incorporated by medieval Buddhists at one time or another, often in the same service. A common practice for the Mantra of Light was to sprinkle pure sand, blessed with this mantra, on the body of a deceased person or their tomb, based on teachings expounded in the Sutra. The belief was that a person who had accumulated much bad karma, and possible rebirth in Hell would be immediately freed and allowed a favorable rebirth into the Pure Land of Amitabha Buddha. This practice is known as dosha-kaji (土砂加持) in Japanese.

Today, the mantra remains one of the most popular mantras in Shingon Buddhism and is also used in Tendai, Zen and Kegon liturgy.

=== Five element mantras ===
Letter A in Siddham script. In Mahayana, the letter A is often used a symbol for the formless Dharmakaya which transcends all thought and word. This is because the letter is first in the Sanskrit alphabet (and so it is like alpha) and it's also a negative prefix (like un-), and so has apophatic connotations.

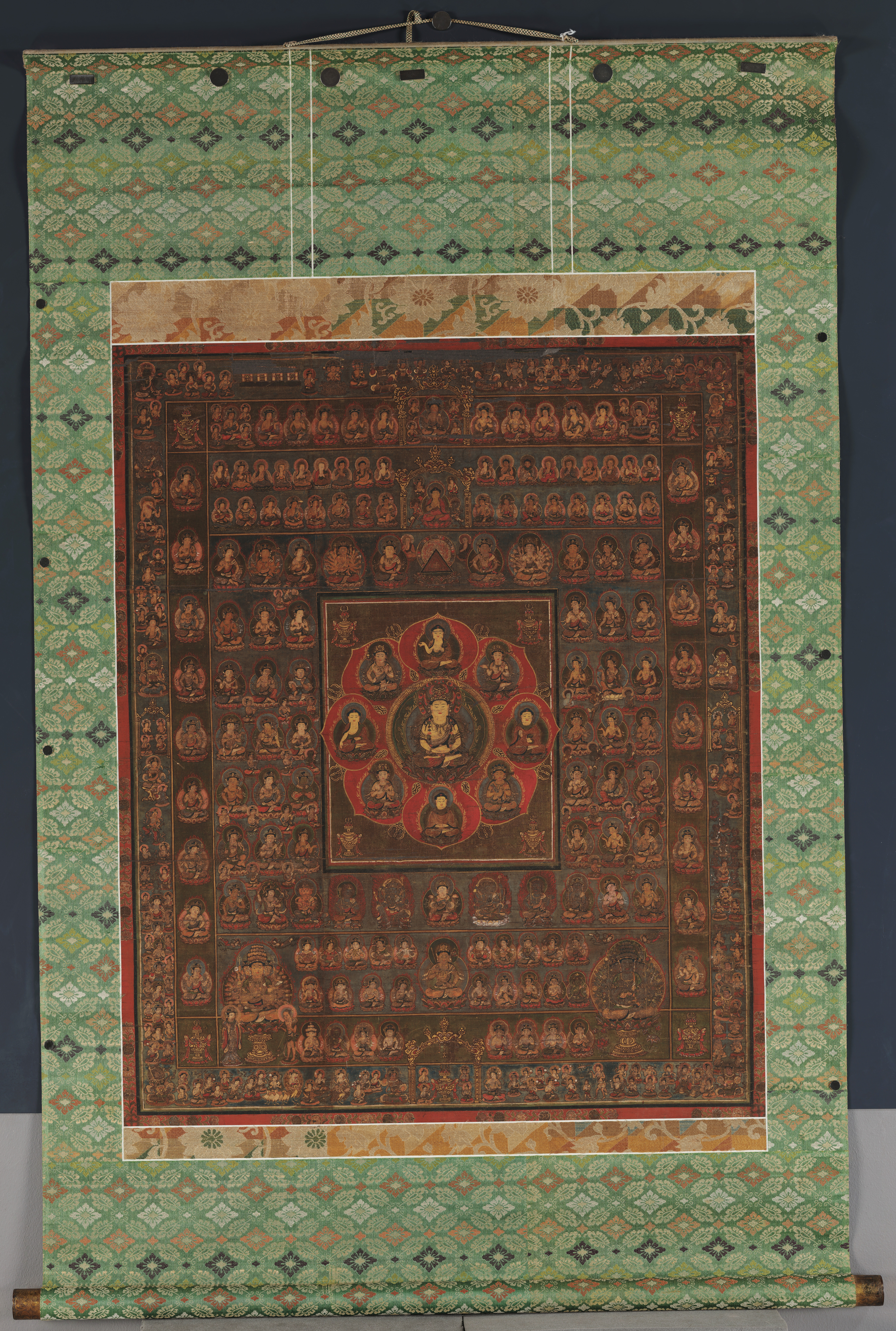
Womb realm mandala with Vairocana at the center, Hanging scroll, textile. Japan, 15th century.

Five syllable mantras (Japanese: goji shingon) symbolize how all things in the universe (here: the five elements) are modes and emanations of Vairocana. One such mantra which is used in the Shingon school is:

aḥ vi ra hūṃ khaṃ

Each syllable is correlated with earth, water, fire, air, space respectively, while Vairocana is the sixth element – consciousness (vijñana). In the Mahavairocana sutra the mantra appears as: Namaḥ samanta-buddhānām aḥ vi ra hūṃ khaṃ. According to East Asian mantrayana writers like Kakuban, this mantra can lead to enlightenment. According to translator Dale A. Todaro, the mantra's syllables have numerous symbolic correlations aside from the five elements, including: "the Five Buddhas (Mahavairocana, Aksobhya, Ratnasambhava, Amitabha, and Amoghasiddhi respectively); the five colors (yellow, white, red, black, and blue); five organs (liver, lungs, heart, kidneys, spleen); five Chinese elements (wood, metal, fire, water, earth); and so on."

A slightly longer variation of this mantra, also found in Shingon is:

Oṃ a vi ra hūṃ khaṃ vajra dhātu vaṃ

This version includes another mantra associated with the Vajra Realm Mandala. There is another five element mantra of Vairocana, which is:

A vaṃ raṃ haṃ khaṃ

An alternate version sometimes appears with a Buddha vandana (homage) as follows:

Namaḥ samanta-buddhānām A vaṃ raṃ haṃ khaṃ

"A" is the seed syllable mantra (bījamantra) of Vairocana in the Garbhadhatu mandala, while "Vaṃ" is the seed syllable of Vairocana in the Vajradhātu mandala. Thus, this five element mantra contains both main seed syllables of Vairocana in the East Asian Esoteric tradition. Furthermore, these two seed syllables are sometimes combined into one mantra: "A-Vaṃ".

=== Dharani ===
A longer dharani associated with Vairocana is the Sarvadurgatiparishodana dharani (Complete removal of all unfortunate rebirths), also known as Kunrig mantra in Tibetan Buddhism. This dharani is found in the Sarvadurgatiparishodana tantra which depicts Vairocana at the center of a mandala surrounded by the other four tathagatas.

The dharani is as follows:

OṂ namo bhagavate sarva durgati pariśodhana rājāya tathāgatāyārhate samyaksambudhāya tadyathā

OṂ śodhane śodhane sarva pāpam viśodhani śuddhe viśuddhe sarvakarmāvarana viśodhani svāhā!

== Statues ==
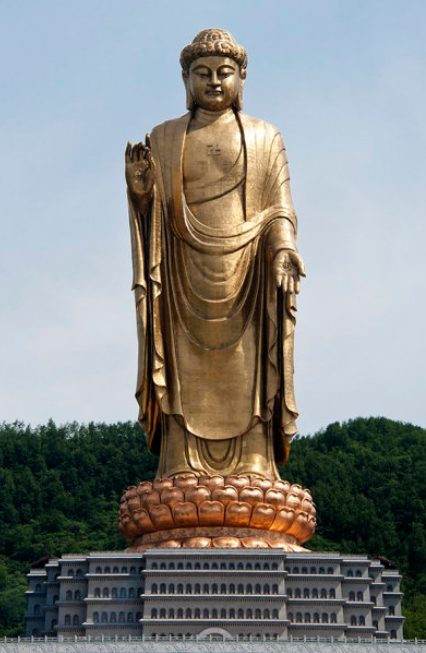
Spring Temple Buddha picturing Vairocana, in Lushan County, Henan, China

The massive size and brilliance of Vairocana statues serve as a reminder that all conditioned existence is empty and without a permanent identity, whereas the Dharmakāya is universal and beyond concepts.

The Spring Temple Buddha of Lushan County, Henan, China, depicts Vairocana. With a height of 126 meters, it is the second tallest statue in the world (see list of tallest statues).

The Daibutsu in the Tōdai-ji in Nara, Japan, is the largest bronze image of Vairocana in the world.

The larger of the Buddhas of Bamiyan in Afghanistan that were destroyed by the Taliban was also a depiction of Vairocana.

In Java, Indonesia, the ninth-century Mendut temple near Borobudur in Magelang was dedicated to the Dhyani Buddha Vairocana. Built by the Shailendra dynasty, the temple featured a three-meter tall stone statue of Vairocana, seated and performing the dharmachakra mudrā. The statue is flanked with statues of the bodhisattvas Avalokiteśvara and Vajrapani.

== Gallery ==
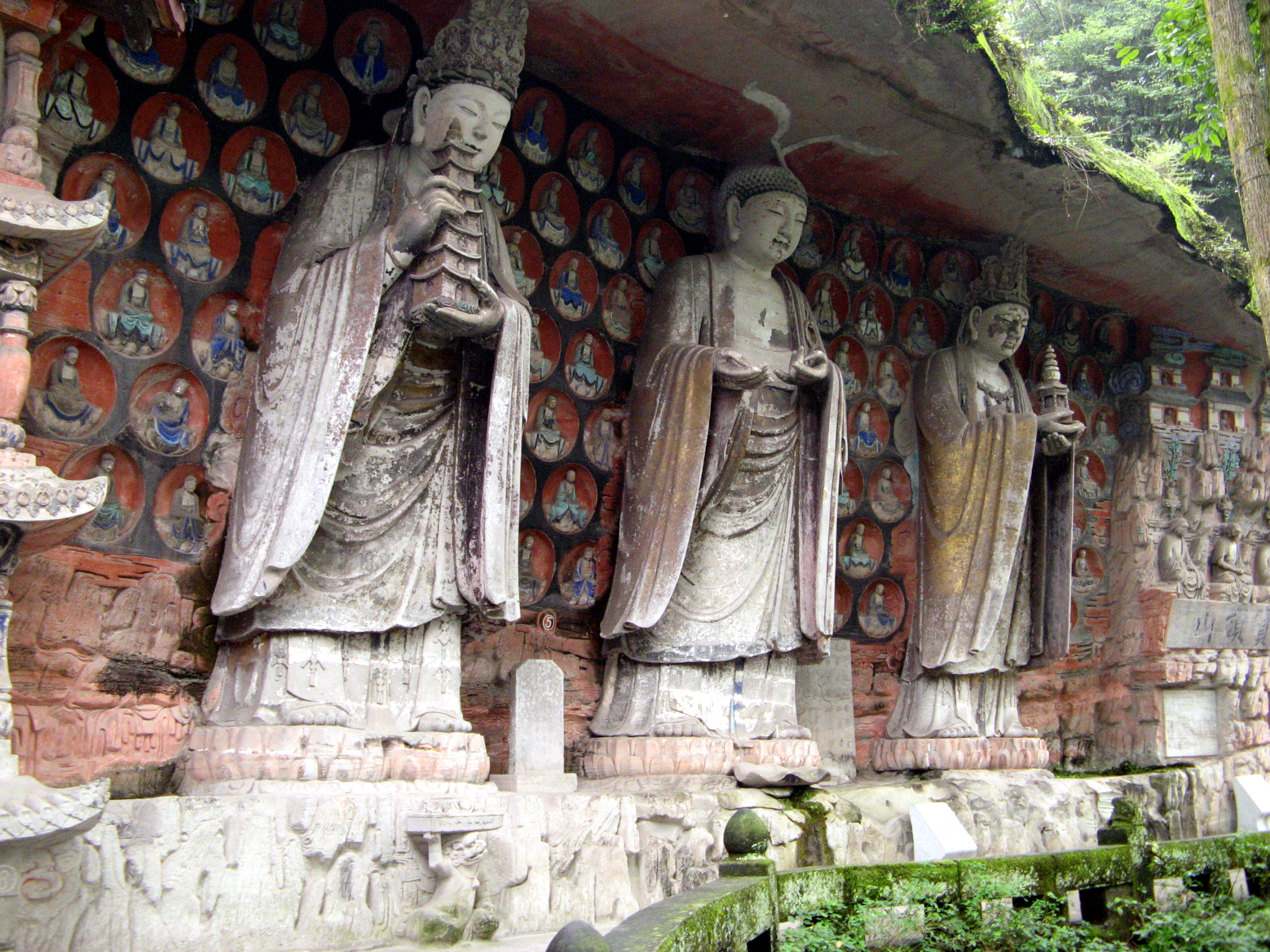
Southern Song Dynasty (1127–1279 CE) cliff carving of Vairocana (centre), with Manjushri (left), and Samantabhadra (right) among the Dazu Rock Carvings at Mount Baoding, Dazu District, Chongqing, China

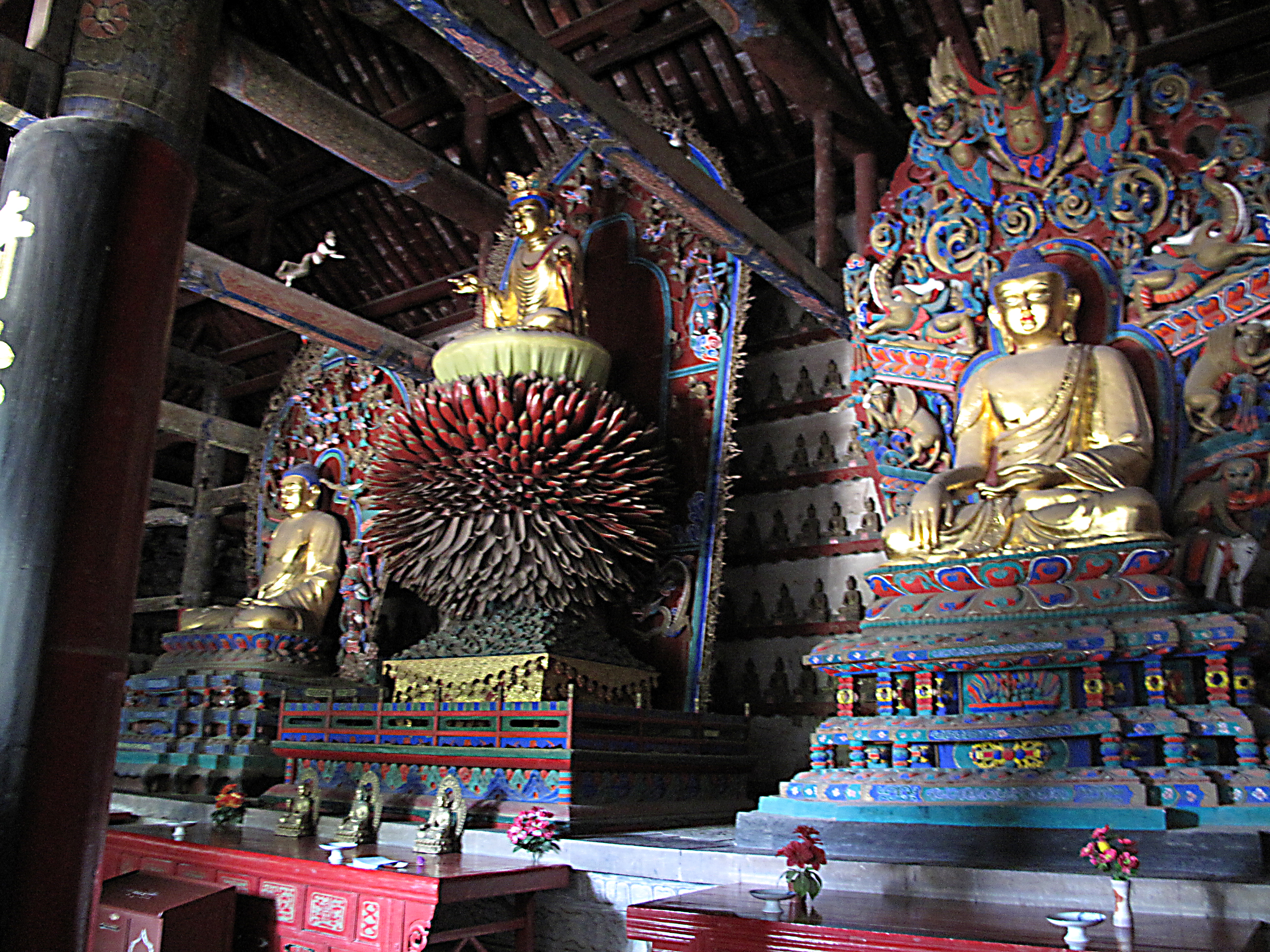
Ming dynasty statues of Vairocana (center), flanked on the far left by Amitabha and on the right by Bhaisajyaguru. Projecting tongues from Vairocana's throne are petals that symbolize his radiance in infinite directions.

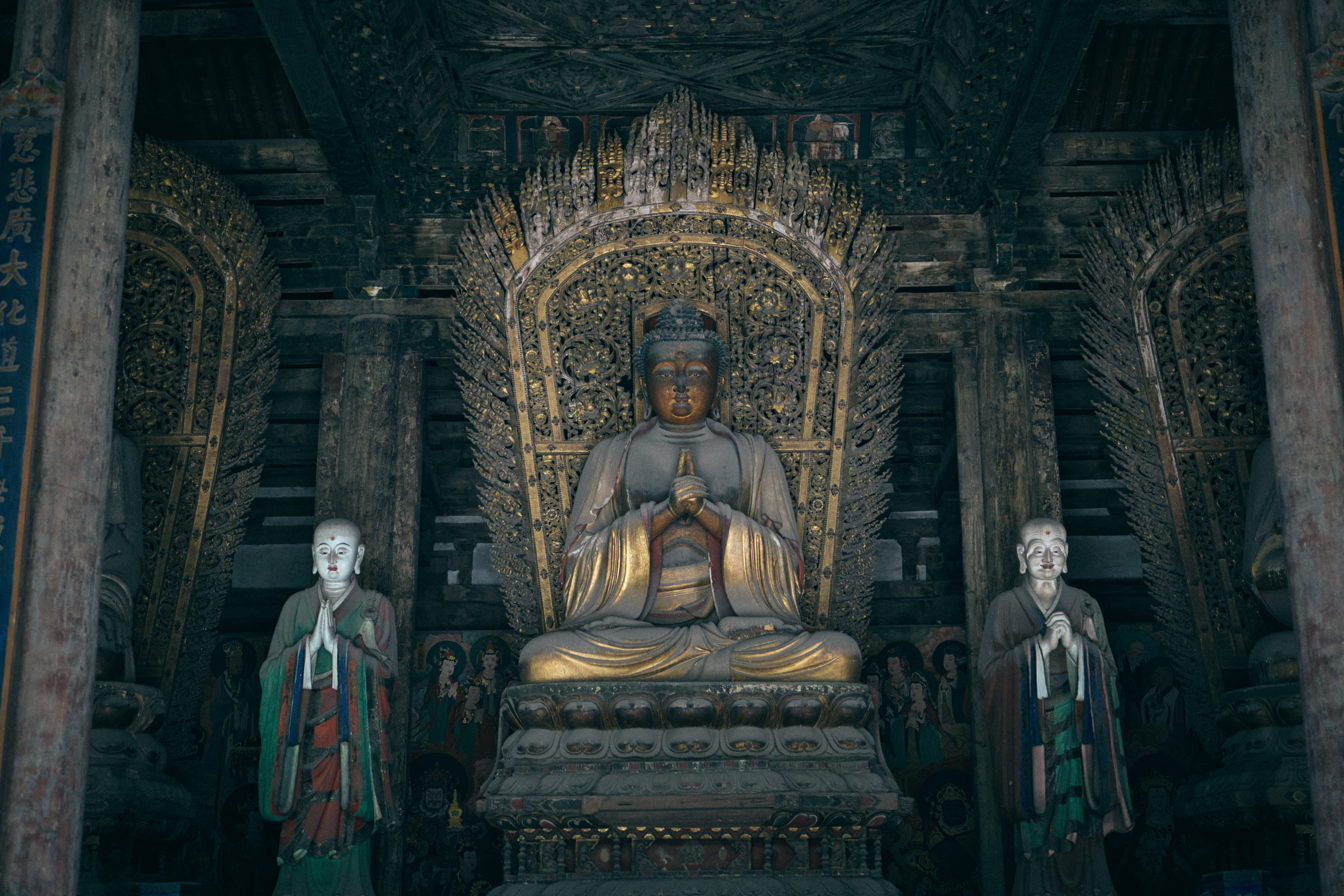
Jin Dynasty (1115–1234) statue of Vairocana in Shanhua Temple in Datong, Shanxi, China, one out of a set of statues of the Five Tathāgatas

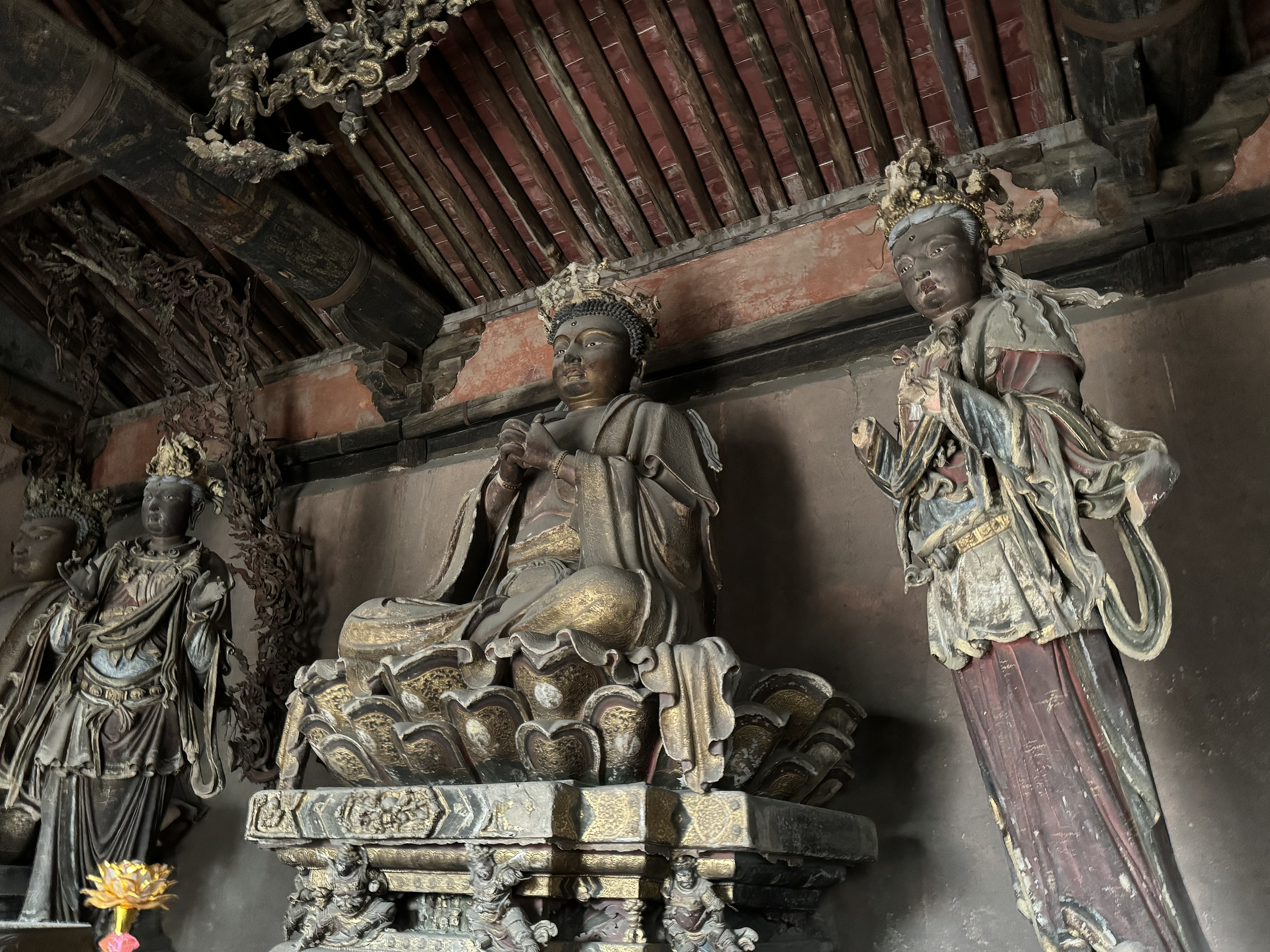
Jin Dynasty (1115–1234) statue of Vairocana with two attendant Bodhisattvas in Longxing Temple in Yuncheng, Shanxi, China

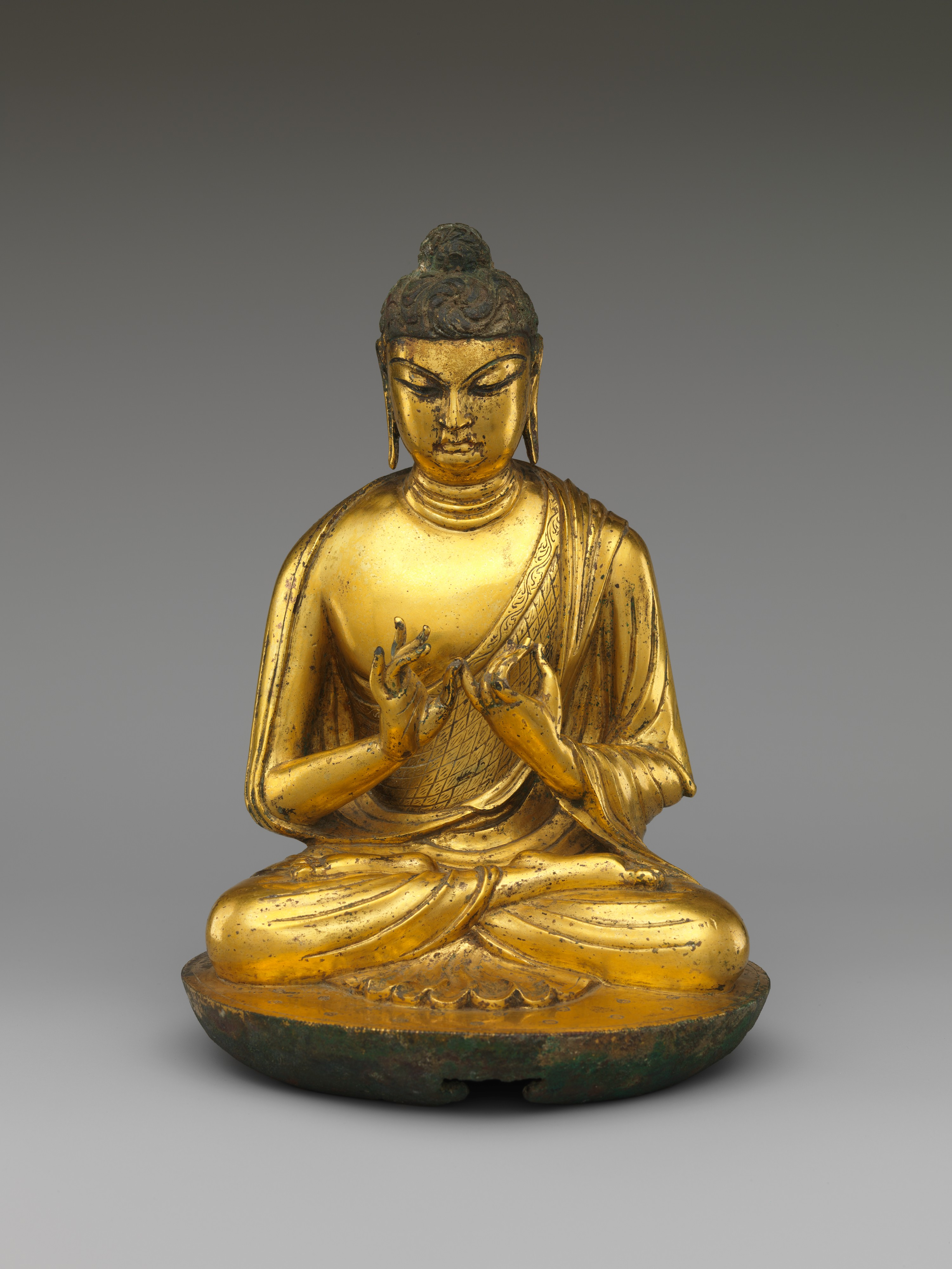
Tang dynasty bronze statue of Vairocana. 8th century.

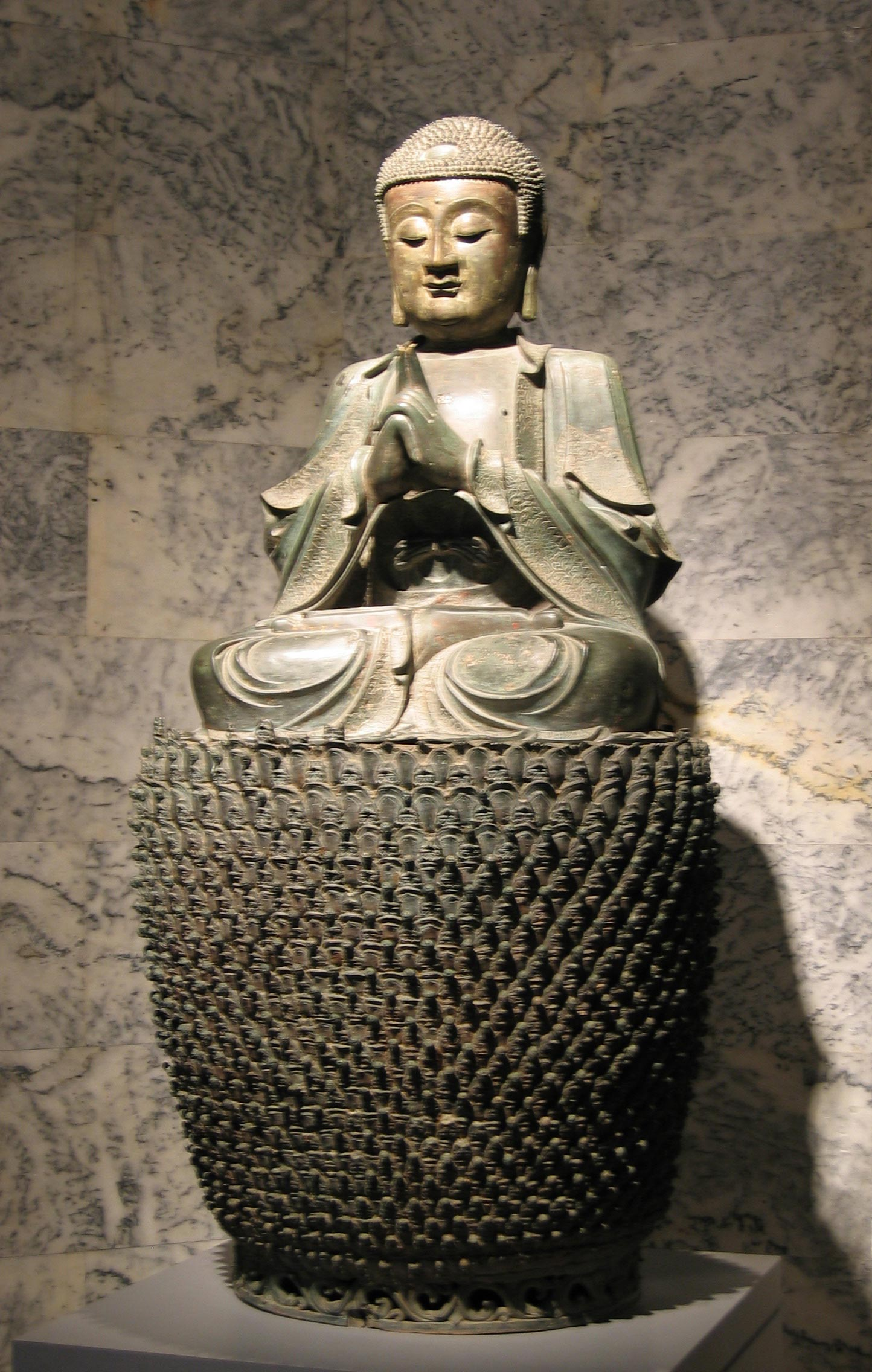
Copper alloy statue of Vairocana, made in China during the Ming dynasty (1368–1644). Displayed at the Cantor Center for Visual Arts.

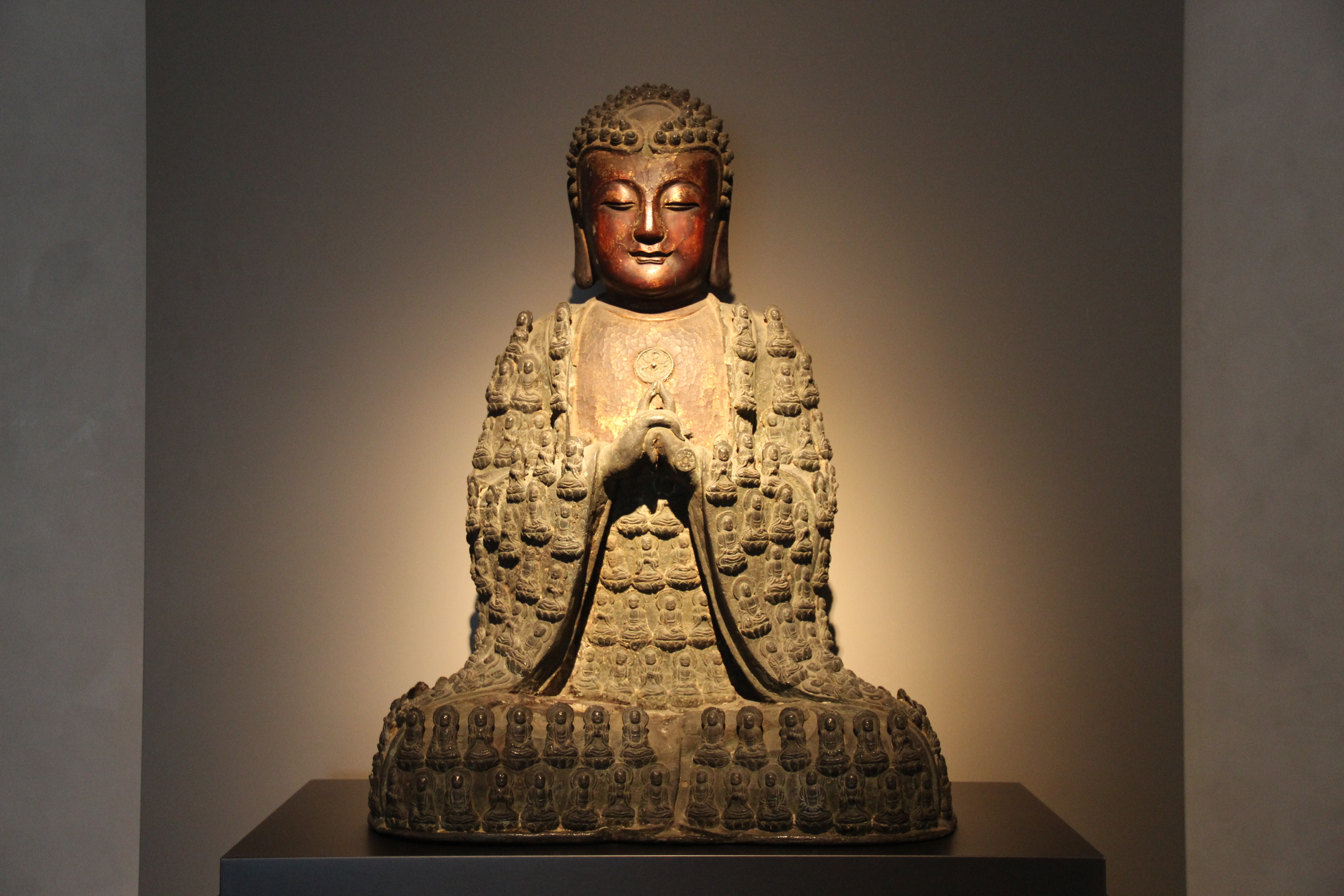
Ming dynasty bronze statue of Vairocana. Displayed at the Buddhism Sculpture Gallery in Aurora Museum, Pudong, Shanghai.

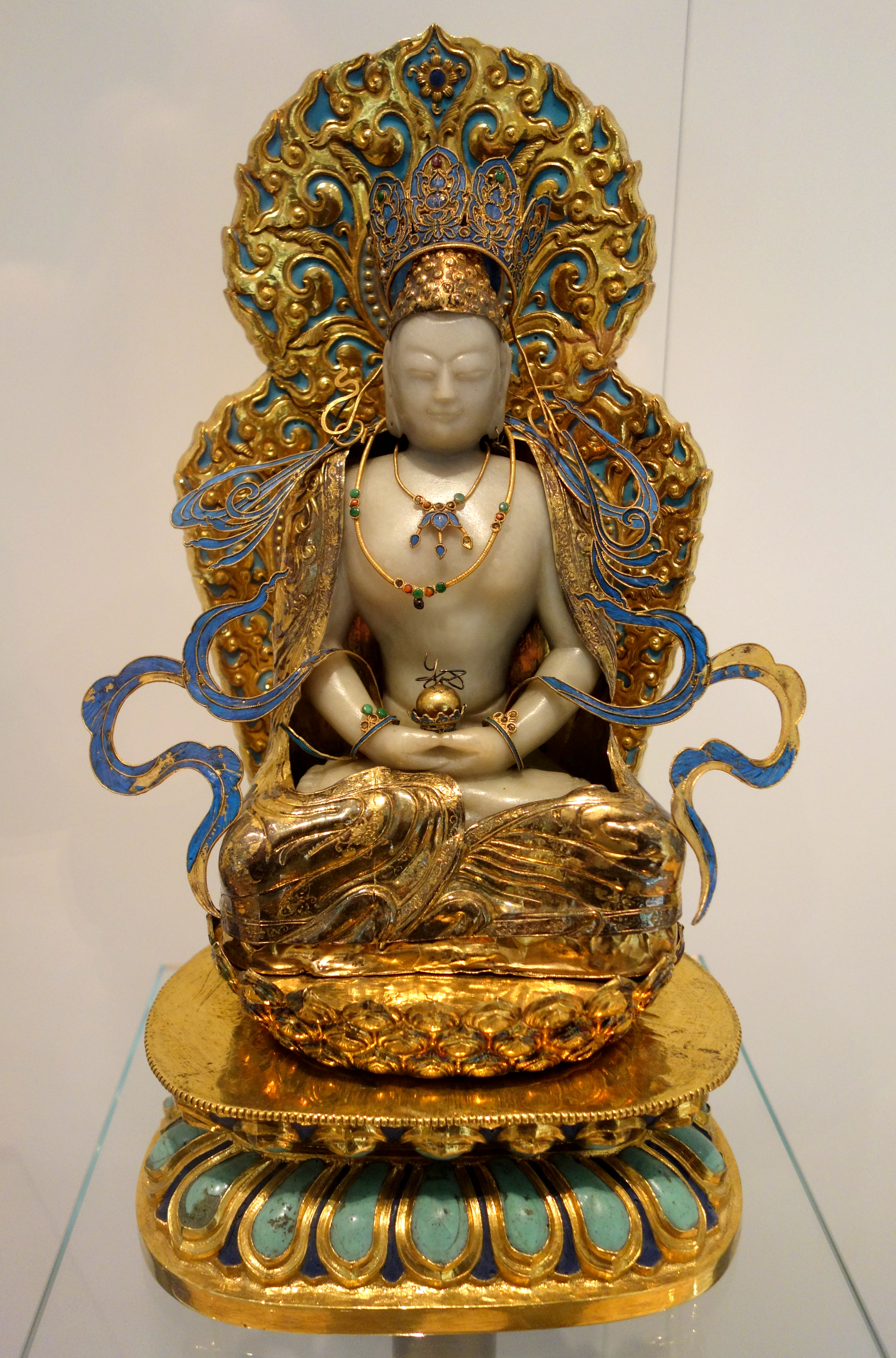
Statue of Vairocana, made in China during the Qing dynasty. 19th century. Made of jade, gilt bronze, enamel, pearls and kingfisher feathers. Displayed at the Royal Ontario Museum.

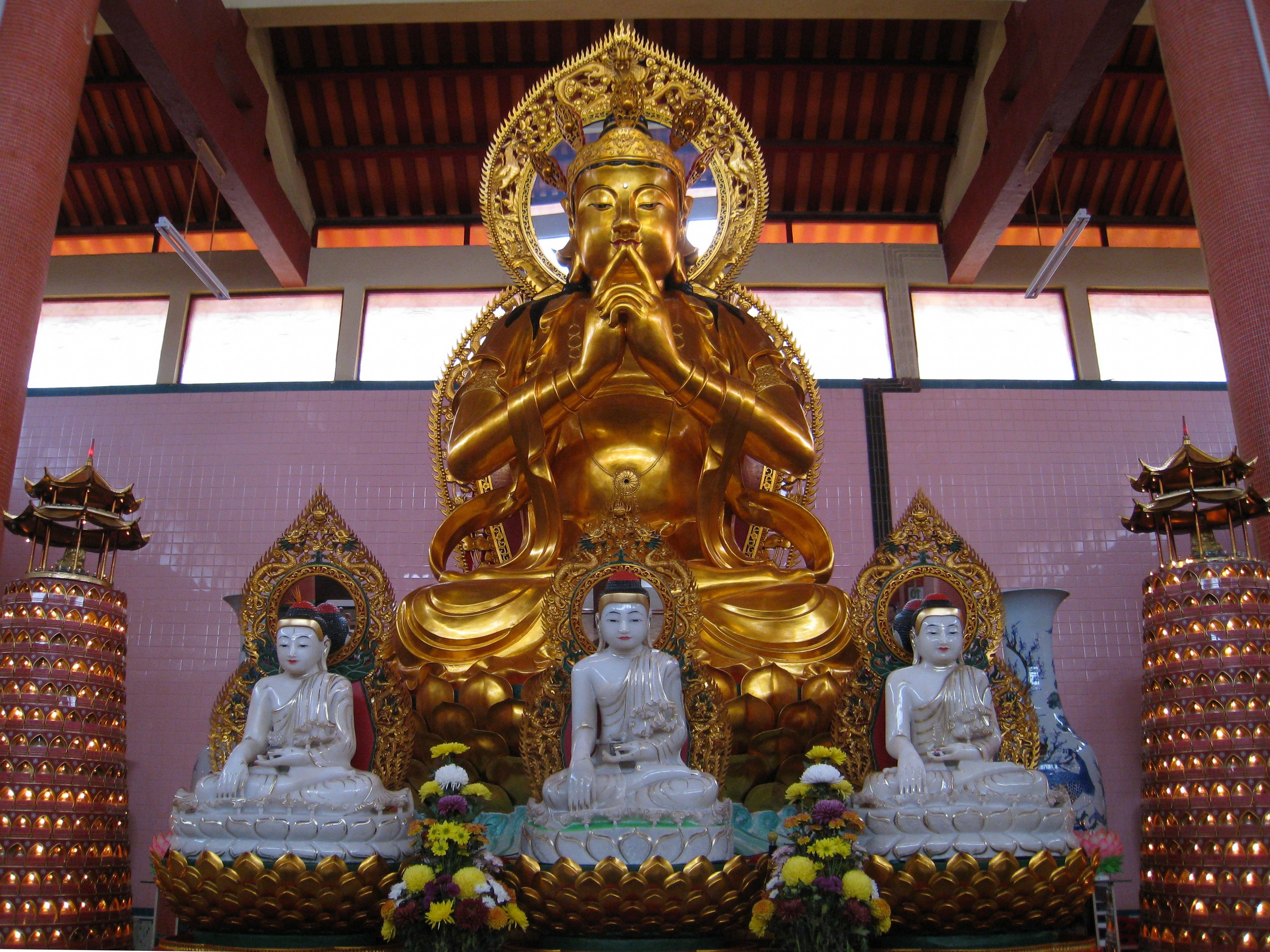
Vairocana statue in Sam Poh Wan Futt Chi, a Chinese Buddhist temple in Cameron Highlands, Pahang, Malaysia

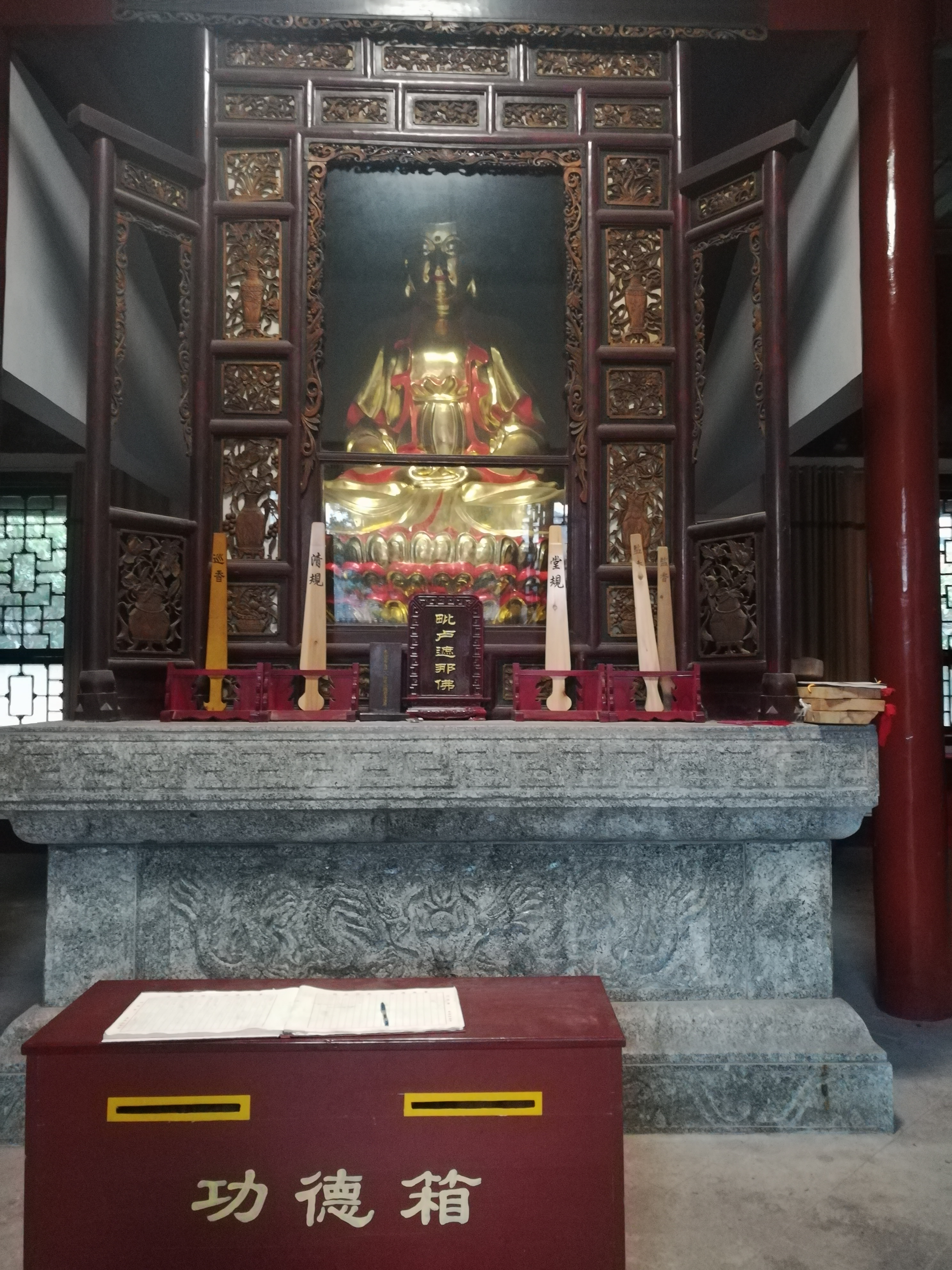
Shrine to Vairocana in Zhusheng Temple, Hunan, China

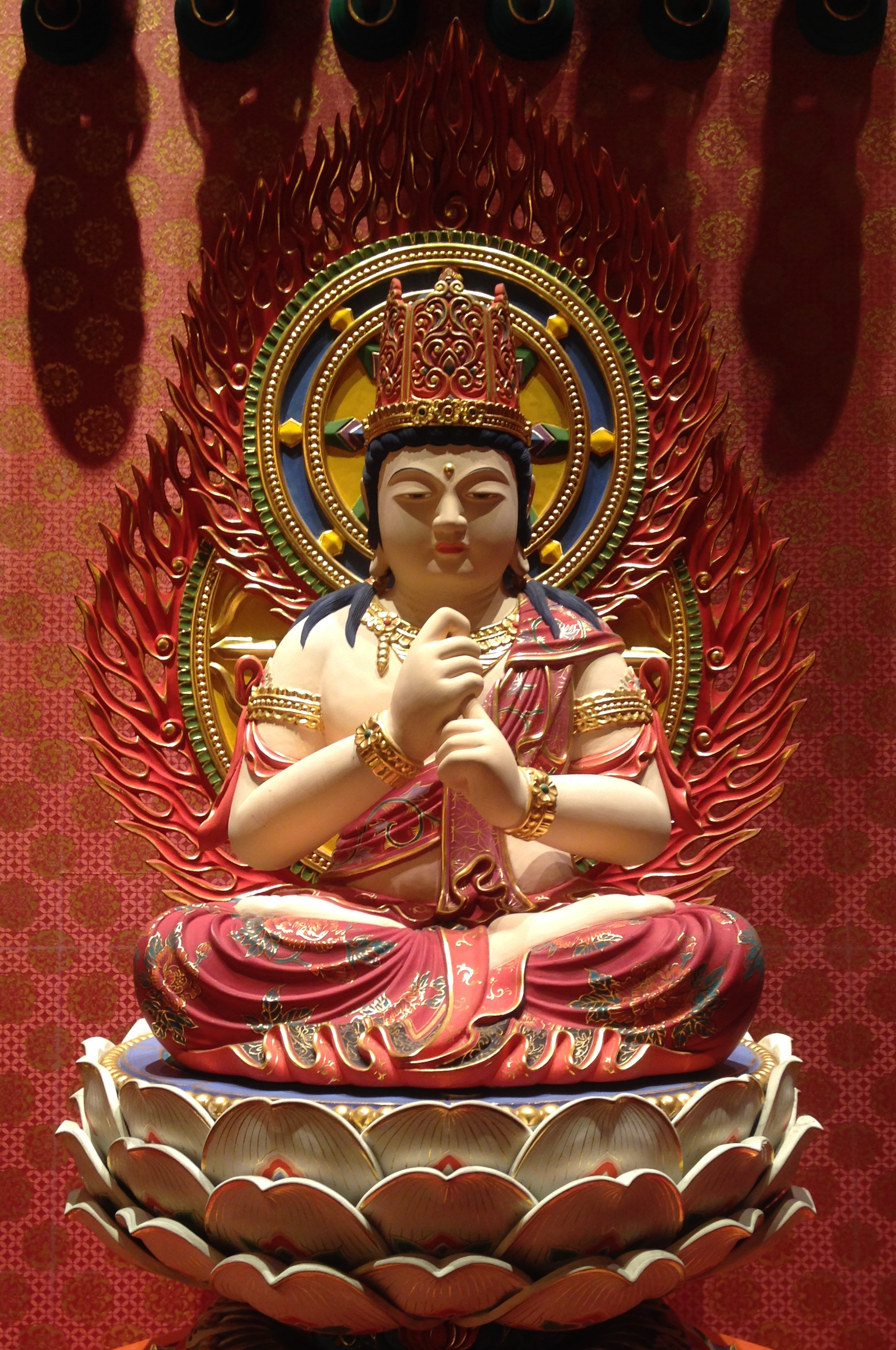
Vairocana at Buddha Tooth Relic Temple and Museum, Chinatown, Singapore.

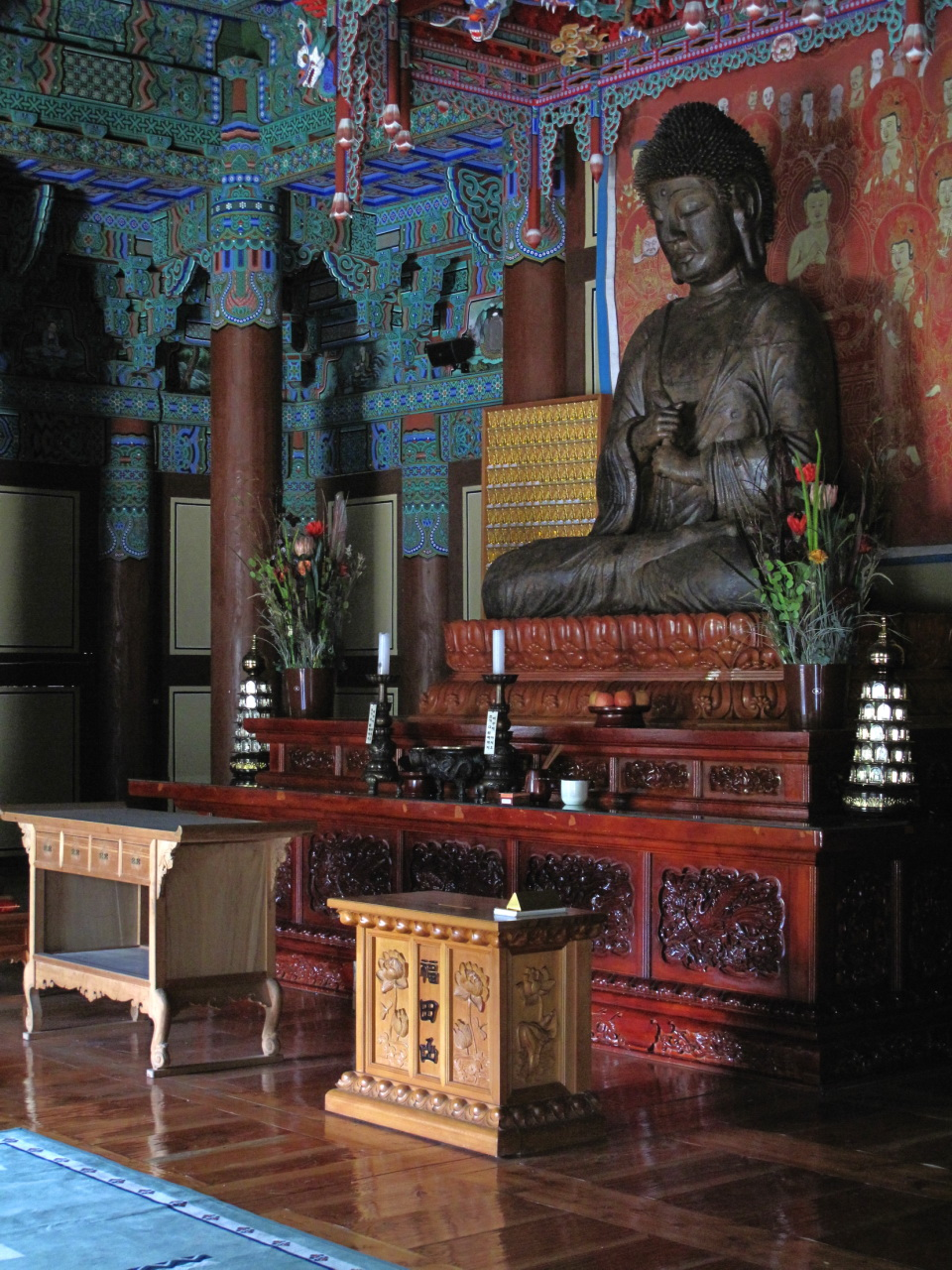
Seated iron statue of Vairocana in Borimsa Temple, on Gaji mountain in Jangheung County, South Jeolla, South Korea.

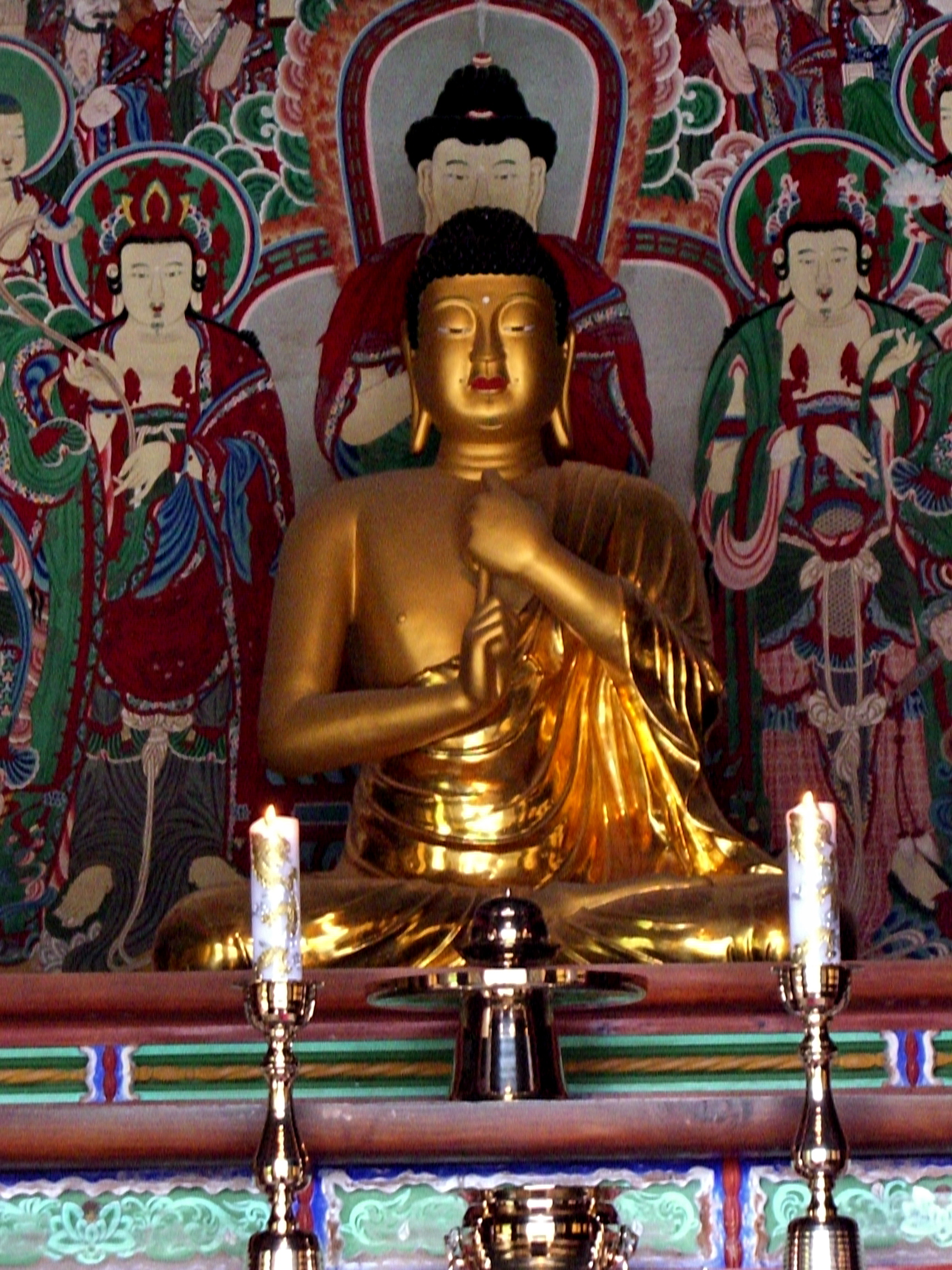
A gilt-bronze statue of Vairocana Buddha, one of the National Treasures of South Korea, at Bulguksa

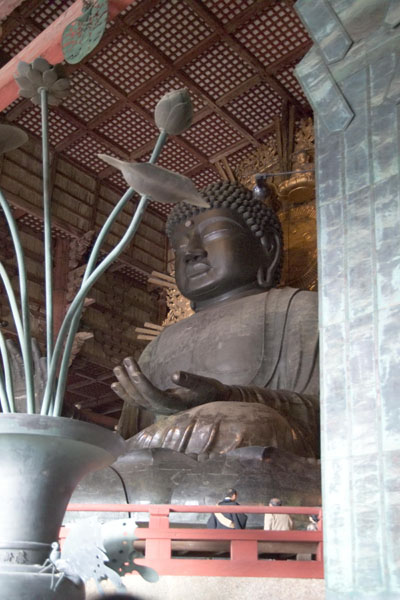
The Great Buddha of Tōdai-ji, at a Kegon Buddhist temple in Nara, Japan

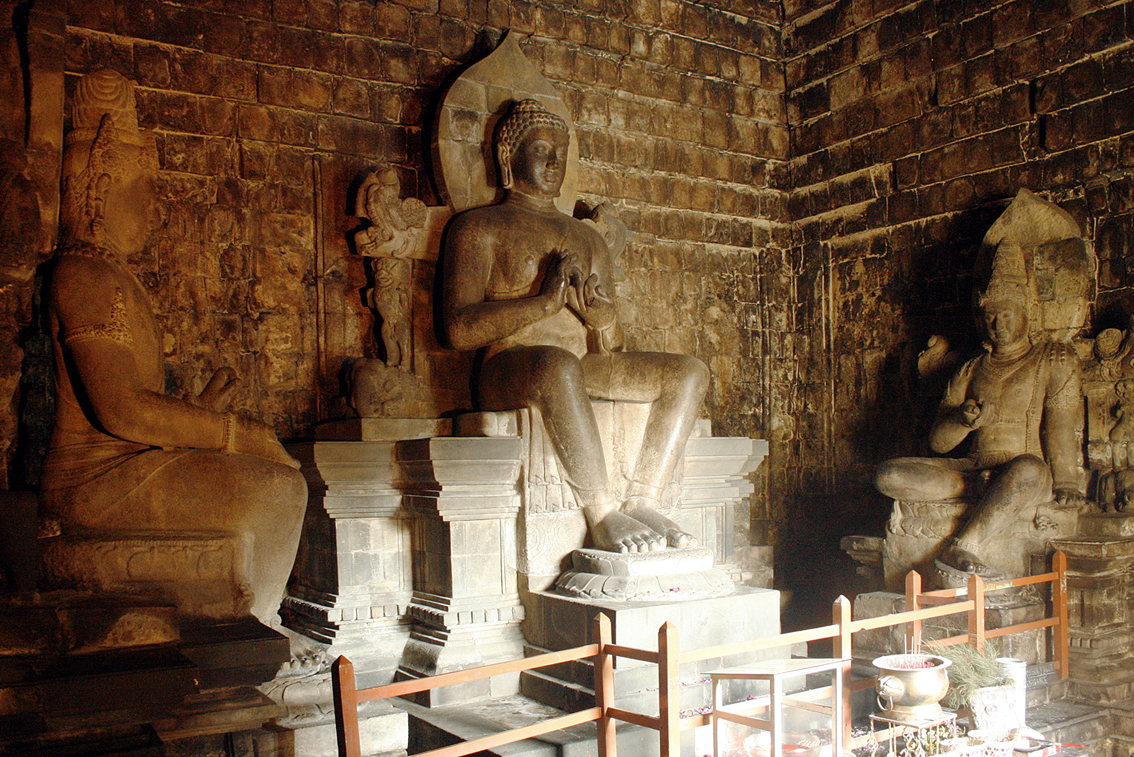
Vairocana with Avalokitesvara and Vajrapani. 9th century, Indonesia.

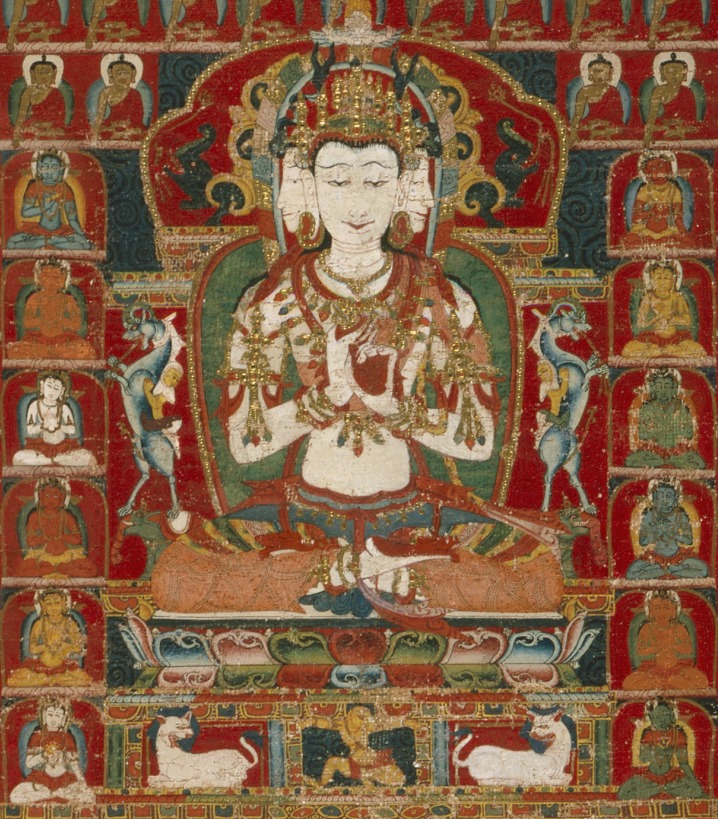
Multi-headed Sarvavid Vairochana, Central Tibet, circa late 13th – early 14th century

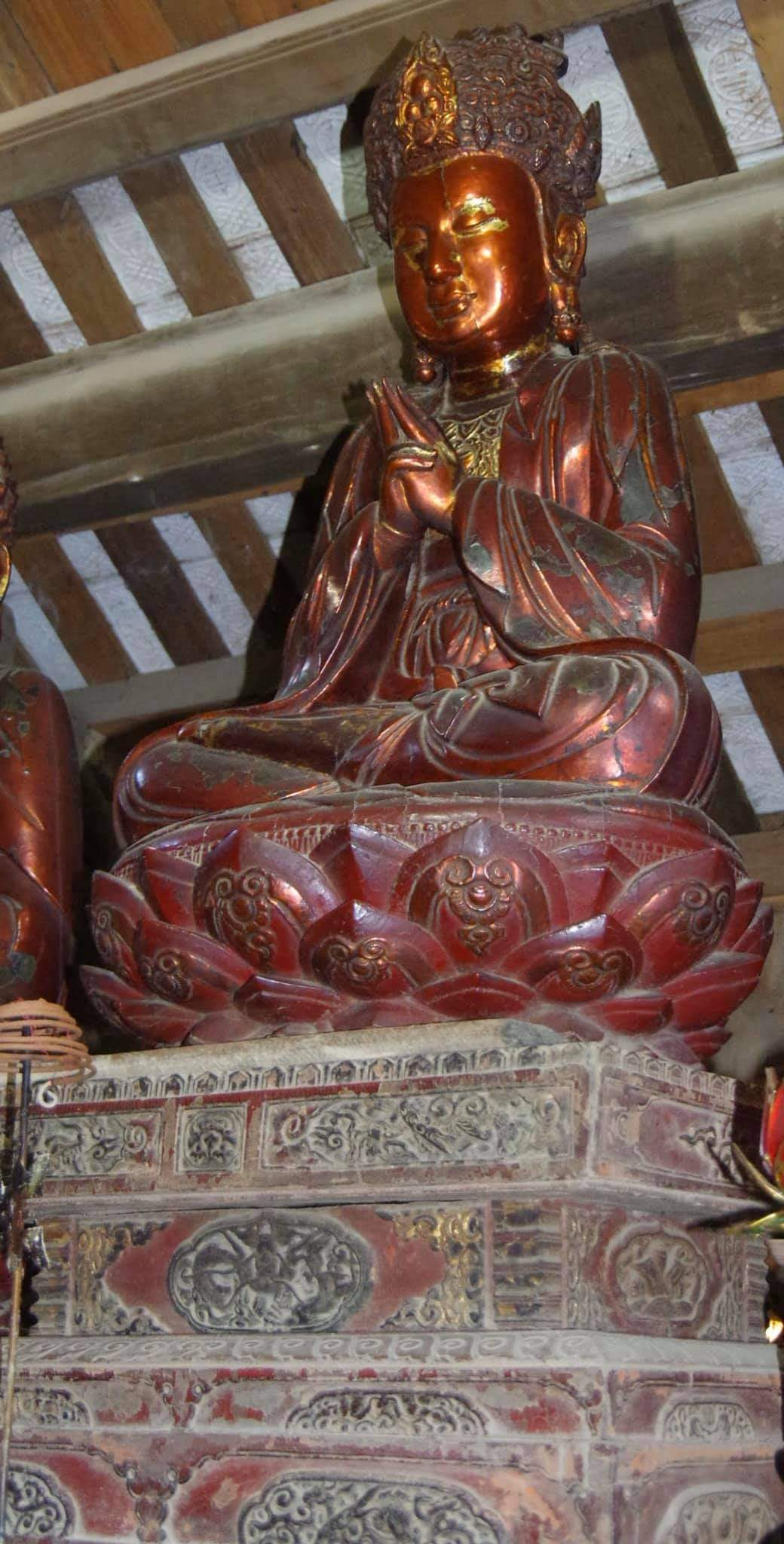
Vairocana statue in Northern Vietnam, 19th century AD, Nguyễn dynasty

== See also ==
- Amaterasu
- Acala
- Dakini
- Ghanavyūha Sūtra
- Mantra of Light

== Bibliography ==
- Vessantara (1993). Meeting The Buddhas, Birmingham: Windhorse Publications, ISBN 0-904766-53-5.
- Buswell, Robert E. Jr.; Lopez, Donald S. Jr. (2013). The Princeton Dictionary of Buddhism. Princeton University Press. ISBN 978-0691157863.
- Cook, Francis H. (1977). Hua-Yen Buddhism: The Jewel Net of Indra. Pennsylvania State University Press. ISBN 978-0-271-02190-4.
- Cook, Francis H. (1972). 'The meaning of Vairocana in Hua-Yen Buddhism, Philosophy East and West 22 (4), 403-415
- Shingon Texts. BDK English Tripi†aka 98-I, II, III, IV, V, VI, VII. Translated by Giebel, Rolf W.; Todaro, Dale A. Numata Center for Buddhist Translation and Research. 2004. pp. 247–248. ISBN 9781886439245.
- Lin, Weiyu (2021). Exegesis-philosophy interplay: introduction to Fazang's (643-712) commentary on the Huayan jing (60 juans) [Skt. Avataṃsaka Sūtra; Flower garland sūtra] — the Huayan jing tanxuan ji [record of investigating the mystery of the Huayan jing] (Thesis). Vancouver: University of British Columbia Library.
- Liu, Kuei-Chieh (2007). "On the Synthesis of Huayan Thought and Pure Land Practice by Early Qing Dynasty Buddhist Scholars (清初華嚴念佛思想試析——以續法與彭紹升為例)". Journal of Chinese Buddhist Studies. 20. ISSN 1017-7132.
- Park, Kwangsoo (2003). A Comparative Study of the Concept of Dharmakaya Buddha: Vairocana in Hua-yen and Mahavairocana in Shingon Buddhism, International Journal of Buddhist Thought and Culture 2, 305-331
- Reeves, Gene (2008). The Lotus Sutra: A Contemporary Translation of a Buddhist Classic. Somerville: Wisdom Publications. ISBN 978-0-86171-571-8.
- Susumu, Otake (2012). "Sakyamuni and Vairocana". In Gimello, Roberto; Girard, Frederic; Hamar, Imre (eds.). Avataṃsaka Buddhism in East Asia: Huayan, Kegon, Flower Ornament Buddhism. Origins and adaptation of a visual culture. Asiatische Forschungen: Monographienreihe zur Geschichte, Kultur und Sprache der Völker Ost- u. Zentralasiens. Wiesbaden: Harrassowitz. ISBN 978-3-447-06678-5.
- Unno, Mark (2004). Shingon Refractions: Myoe and the Mantra of Light. Wisdom Publicationa. ISBN 9780861713905.
