= New Age Orientalism =

New Age Orientalism is a modern Western perception of Tibet and of other Asian-majority countries. Tibetologist Donald S. Lopez Jr., who specializes in Western discourse on Tibet, popularised the term.

== Background ==
Lopez studied the depiction of Tibet in Western academic writing. He found that before the New Age movement, depictions of Tibet were often cynical and derogatory. Orientalism's patronizing characterized portrayals of Tibet before the emergence of New Age Orientalism.

Manifest destiny and the broader ideologies of racism and white supremacy were used to justify imperialism and colonialism. Western powers never fully succeeded in gaining imperial control of Tibet, however, despite British and Russian military efforts. In Western eyes Tibet never modernized, refusing to adopt European educational systems or norms. Throughout the 19th and 20th centuries, Tibet remained inaccessible to Western powers and was portrayed as isolated, closed, and uncivilized.

== New Age views of Tibet ==
Embedded in the New Age movement, New Age Orientalism describes a positive Western perception of old Tibet (before the 1950 Chinese invasion and the 1959 diaspora). It is seen as a Western fantasy, rather than a depiction of reality.

New Age Orientalism is an orientalist perception of Tibet in which Tibet is not depreciated, but romanticized. It is based on Romantic Orientalism, "in which the 'West' perceives some lack within itself and fantasizes that the answer, through a process of projection, is to be found somewhere in the 'East'". In this manner, the four characteristics of Orientalism persist with slight variations; the logic of opposites now relates to old Tibet and China. Tibet is no longer perceived as an antiquated "oriental despotism," but as a Shangri-La: positive, holy, and pristine. It is seen as incorrupt, since it was never dominated by the West. The Chinese constitute its opposite as the evil, subhuman force invading a land of peaceful, devoted inhabitants. Old Tibetan culture seems removed from time and history. This allows the West to aggrandize itself as rescuers of Tibet and Tibetan Buddhism, whereas, depicting Tibetans as helpless and voiceless; the West again finds itself in a patronizing position, representing another culture.

=== In popular culture ===
A romanticized picture of Tibet has been partially constructed and reflected by popular culture. Hollywood films such as Seven Years in Tibet, Kundun, and Little Buddha paint a romanticized picture of Tibet and uphold the Western rescue paradigm in line with the play of opposites between China and Tibet. Publications surrounding the Free Tibet movement have been viewed as New Age Orientalism. The constructed fantasy of a Shangri-La Tibet reflects on the Western struggle within its national identities and the pitfalls of globalization.

== Expansion ==
The concept of New Age Orientalism, originally relating to Tibet, has been expanded and applied to other cultures (particularly Eastern esotericism) and religions (such as Hinduism) in academic literature. The discourse on and perception of Ayurveda, for example, has been categorized as New Age Orientalism.

== Criticism ==
Lopez's view of New Age Orientalism has been criticized for placing undue weight on the impact and power of Orientalism and viewing Tibet as a closed totality removed from history. Alternatives to Orientalism are not considered. The concept has also been criticized for neglecting the Tibetan struggle under Chinese occupation and negative Oriental views of Old Tibet as feudal and antiquated.

== See also ==
- Free Tibet
- Eastern esotericism
- List of New Age topics
