= List of New Age topics =

This list of New Age topics is provided as an overview of and topical guide to New Age. New Age is a form of Western esotericism which includes a range of spiritual or religious practices and beliefs which grew rapidly in Western society during the early 1970s.

== Movement ==
=== Predecessors ===
- Alice Bailey
- Guy Ballard
- Helena Blavatsky
- Edgar Cayce
- Aleister Crowley
- George Gurdjieff
- Aldous Huxley
- Carl Jung
- P. D. Ouspensky
- Herbert Sutcliffe

=== Influences ===
- Counterculture of the 1960s
- Human Potential Movement
- New Thought
- Perennial philosophy
- Spiritualism
- Sun sign astrology
- Thelema
- Theosophy
- UFO religion

=== Influencers ===
- Buckminster Fuller (Architecture)
- Anagarika Govinda (Buddhism)
- George Harrison (Gurus)
- Julian Jaynes (Bicameral mentality)
- Timothy Leary (LSD)
- Maharishi Mahesh Yogi (Hinduism)
- Neem Karoli Baba (Bhakti yoga)
- Bhagwan Shree Rajneesh (Neo-sannyasa)
- D. T. Suzuki (Zen Buddhism)
- Chögyam Trungpa (Shambhala Training)
- Tarthang Tulku (Tibetan Buddhism)
- Yogi Bhajan (Kundalini yoga)

=== Proponents ===
- José Argüelles
- Richard Bach
- Guy Ballard
- James Herbert Brennan
- Rhonda Byrne
- Eileen Caddy
- Fritjof Capra
- Lee Carroll
- Carlos Castaneda
- Deepak Chopra
- Paulo Coelho
- Benjamin Creme
- Marilyn Ferguson
- Shakti Gawain
- Linda Goodman
- Alex Grey
- Stanislav Grof
- Willis Harman
- Michael Harner
- Andrew Harvey
- Louise Hay
- Corinne Heline
- Oscar Ichazo
- David Icke
- John C. Lilly
- Max Freedom Long
- Shirley MacLaine
- Caroline Myss
- Claudio Naranjo
- Leonard Orr
- Ram Dass
- James Redfield
- Jane Roberts
- Walter Russell
- Mark Satin
- Rupert Sheldrake
- David Spangler
- Eckhart Tolle
- Neale Donald Walsch
- Ken Wilber
- Stuart Wilde
- Marianne Williamson

== Astrology ==
- 2012 phenomenon
- Age of Aquarius
- Astrocartography
- Dreamspell
- Harmonic Convergence
- Psychological astrology

== Consciousness ==
- Astral projection
- Cetacean intelligence
- Higher consciousness
- Reincarnation

== Cultural movements ==
- Dances of Universal Peace
- Hundredth monkey effect
- Indigo children
- Large-group awareness training
- Nambassa
- New Age communities
- New Age music
- New Age travellers
- Sacred travel
- Spiritual but not religious

== Earth mysteries ==
- Earthships
- Feng shui
- Ley lines
- Glastonbury
- Machu Picchu
- Stonehenge

== Holistic health ==
- Alternative medicine
- Chromotherapy
- Crystal healing
- Energy medicine
- Pyramid power
- Self-help books

== Practices ==
- Affirmations
- Breathwork
- Chakras
- Channeling
- Creative visualization
- Magic
- Meditation
- Mindfulness
- Neotantra

== Political movements ==
- New World Alliance

== Psychology topics ==
- Bicameral mentality
- Eight-circuit model of consciousness
- Enneagram of Personality
- Integral theory
- Personality types
- Neuro-linguistic programming
- Transpersonal psychology

== Special abilities ==
- A Course in Miracles
- Levitation
- Psychometry
- Remote viewing
- Seeing auras
- Synchronicity

== Spirituality ==
- Be Here Now
- Gaianism
- Mayanism
- Neopaganism
- Neoshamanism
- New Age Orientalism
- Panentheism
- Quantum mysticism
- Soulmates
- Yoga as exercise

== Terrestrial and extraterrestrial life ==
- Alien abduction
- Crop circles
- Dolphin communication
- Gaia hypothesis

== See also ==
- Aleister Crowley bibliography
- Fundamental Fysiks Group – Quantum mysticism organization
- Hair (musical) – 1960s counterculture rock musical
- Hippie § Spirituality and religion – 1960s counterculture beliefs
- Lifestyles of Health and Sustainability – Demographic defining a particular market segment
- List of images on the cover of Sgt. Pepper's Lonely Hearts Club Band
- List of psychedelic literature
- Mystical or religious experience
