= Robert Buswell Jr. =

American Buddhist scholar (b. 1953)

Robert Evans Buswell Jr.
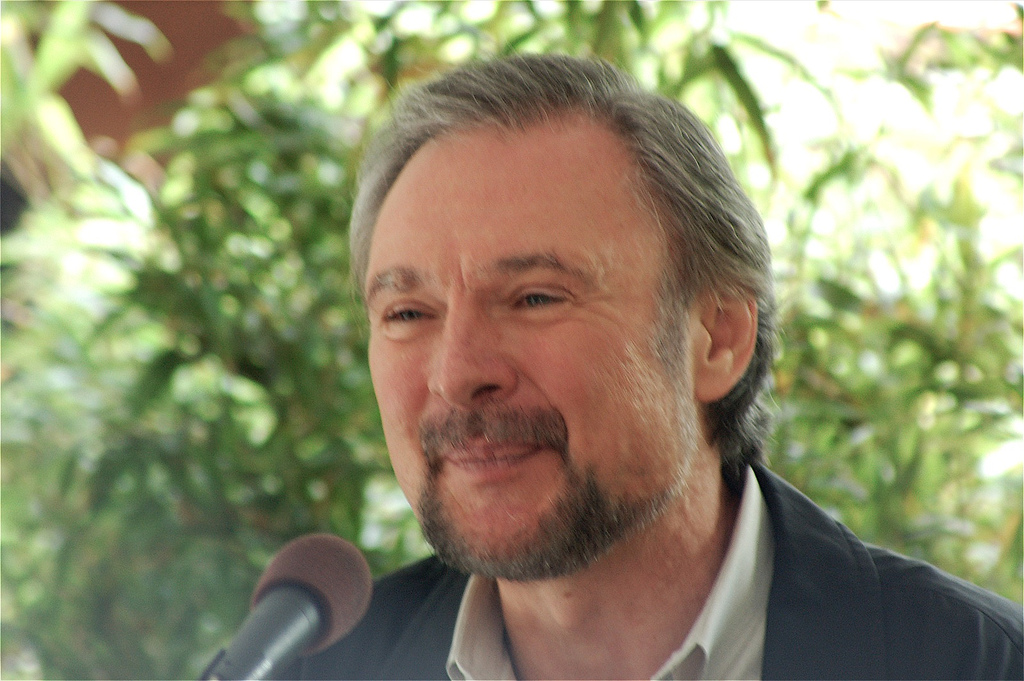
- Born: 1953 (age 72–73)
- Occupation: Writer
- Known for: Scholarship on Korean Buddhism and Chinese Buddhism
- Awards: Manhae Grand Prize (2009); Puri Prize for Buddhist Studies

Academic background
- Education: University of California, Santa Barbara; University of California, Berkeley
- Thesis: The Korean Origin of the Vajrasamadhi-Sutra: A Case Study in Determining the Dating, Provenance, and Authorship of a Buddhist Apocryphal Scripture (1985)

Academic work
- Discipline: Buddhist Studies, Korean Religions
- Institutions: University of California, Los Angeles; Dongguk University

Robert Evans Buswell Jr. (born 1953) is an American academic and writer on Korean Buddhism and Chinese Buddhism as well as Korean religions in general. He is a distinguished professor emeritus of Buddhist studies at the University of California, Los Angeles and founding director of the Academy of Buddhist Studies (Korean: 불교 학술원) at Dongguk University, Korea's main Buddhist university.

He retired from UCLA in 2022.

== Education ==
Buswell began his undergraduate education at the University of California, Santa Barbara and attended between September 1971 and December 1972. His focus was Asian Studies. Buswell then left the United States and became a Buddhist monk in Thailand, then Taiwan, and finally The Republic of Korea where he spent five years at Songgwangsa. This experience was related in his book The Zen Monastic Experience: Buddhist Practice in Contemporary Korea.

He did extensive fieldwork in Buddhist Monasticism between 1972 and 1979 at Wat Bovoranives, Bangkok, Thailand, in 1972 and 1973 on Theravada; at Polam-ji, Landau Island, Hong Kong, in 1973 and 1974 on Ch'an Buddhism; and finally, at Songgwang-sa, Cholla Namdo, Korea, between 1974 and 1979 on Son and Hwaom Buddhism. Returning to the United States, he finished his A.B., with Highest Honors at the University of California, Berkeley in June 1981. He earned an M.A., With Distinction, from U.C. Berkeley in 1983, and his Ph.D. also from U.C. Berkeley in December 1985. His dissertation was entitled "The Korean Origin of the Vajrasamadhi-Sutra: A Case Study in Determining the Dating, Provenance, and Authorship of a Buddhist Apocryphal Scripture."

== Career ==
Buswell is a distinguished professor emeritus of Buddhist studies at the University of California, Los Angeles. He simultaneously served as founding director of the Academy of Buddhist Studies (Pulgyo Haksurwŏn) at Dongguk University, the major Buddhist University in Korea. He served as the chair of the Asian Languages and Cultures Department (1995-07 to 2004-06), and was the founding director of the Center for Buddhist Studies and the Center for Korean Studies (1993-05 to 2001-06) at UCLA. He was interim vice-provost and dean of the International Institute (2000–2001) and was elected president of the Association for Asian Studies (2008–09). He retired from UCLA in 2022.

He has published fifteen books and roughly forty articles on Korean, Chinese, and Indian traditions of Buddhism and Korean religions.

Buswell and other noted scholars of Buddhism at UCLA, such as William Bodiford and Gregory Schopen, have made it one of the strongest Buddhist studies programs in the world.

Buswell and his wife, Christina Lee Buswell, established the Chinul Endowed Chair in Korean Buddhist Studies, named for Puril Pojo Chinul (1158–1210), the most influential monk in the formation of Korean Seon Buddhism. Through gift commitments totaling US$3.7 million, the endowment will also provide a graduate student fellowship in Buddhist studies.

== Honors ==
In 2009, Buswell was awarded the Manhae Grand Prize from the Chogye Order in recognition of his pioneering contributions to Korean Buddhist Studies in the West. He is also a recipient of the Puri Prize for Buddhist Studies in Korea.

Buswell was elected to the American Academy of Arts and Sciences in 2016.

== Works ==
Books

- 1983: The Korean Approach to Zen: The Collected Works of Chinul. Honolulu: University of Hawaii Press. 468 pp.
- 1989: The Formation of Ch'an Ideology in China and Korea: The Vajrasamadhi-Sutra, A Buddhist Apocryphon. Princeton: Princeton University Press. 315 pp.
- 1990: Chinese Buddhist Apocrypha. Editor and Contributor. Honolulu: University of Hawaii Press. 338pp.
- 1991: Tracing Back the Radiance: Chinul's Korean Way of Zen. Classics in East Asian Buddhism, no. 2. Honolulu: University of Hawaii Press, A Kuroda Institute Book. 232pp (Paperback abridgment of The Korean Approach to Zen).
- 1992: The Zen Monastic Experience: Buddhist Practice in Contemporary Korea. Princeton: Princeton University Press. 245pp

Paths to Liberation: The Marga and its Transformations in Buddhist Thought. Coeditor (w/ Robert M. Gimello) and contributor. Studies in East Asian Buddhism series, no 7. Honolulu: University of Hawaii Press, A Kuroda Institute Book. 525pp

- 1996: Abhidharma Buddhism to 150 A.D. Encyclopedia of Indian Philosophies, vol. 7. Delhi: Motilal Barnarsidass. Coeditor (with P. S. Jaini and Noble Ross Reat) and contributor; Karl H. Potter, Editor. 636 pp.
- 2000: The Principal Book of Won-Buddhism (Wonbulgyo chongjon). Translated by Robert E. Buswell Jr., Nak-chung Paik (Seoul National University) and Young Don Choi (Korea University), on behalf of the Department of Edification of Won-Buddhism. Iksan: Won Kwang Publishing Co. 179 pp.
- 2004: Encyclopedia of Buddhism. Editor-in-Chief and contributor. 2 vols. New York: Macmillan Reference. 981 + xxxix pp.
- 2005: Currents and Countercurrents: Korean Influences on the Buddhist Traditions of East Asia. Editor and contributor. Honolulu: University of Hawaii Press. 294 pp.
- 2006: Christianity in Korea. Coeditor (with Timothy S. Lee) and contributor. Honolulu: University of Hawaii Press. 408 pp.

The Scriptures of Won-Buddhism (Wonbulgyo kyojŏn). Translated by Robert E. Buswell Jr., Nak-chung Paik (Seoul National University) and Young Don Choi (Korea University), on behalf of the Department of Edification of Won-Buddhism. Iksan: Won Kwang Publishing Co.467 pp.

- 2007: Cultivating Original Enlightenment: Wŏnhyo's Exposition of the Vajrasamādhi-Sūtra (Kumgang Sammmaegyong Non). The Collected Works of Wonhyo, vol. 1.. Honolulu: University of Hawaii Press, 2007. 429 pp. ISBN 978-0-8248-6208-4. Project MUSE book 8243.
- 2013: The Princeton Dictionary of Buddhism with Donald S. Lopez Jr. Princeton: Princeton University Press, 2013. 1304 pp.
- 2016: Numinous Awareness Is Never Dark: The Korean Buddhist Master Chinul’s Excerpts on Zen Practice. Translated, annotated, and with an introduction by Robert E. Buswell Jr.. Honolulu: University of Hawaii Press. 352 pp. ISBN 978-0-8248-6739-3.

Articles

- Buswell, Robert E. (2004). "Sugi's 'Collation Notes' to the Koryŏ Buddhist Canon and Their Significance for Buddhist Textual Criticism". The Journal of Korean Studies. 9 (1): 129–184. doi:10.1353/jks.2004.0009. JSTOR 41485332. S2CID 145781227.
