= Donald S. Lopez Jr. =

American scholar of Buddhism (born 1952)

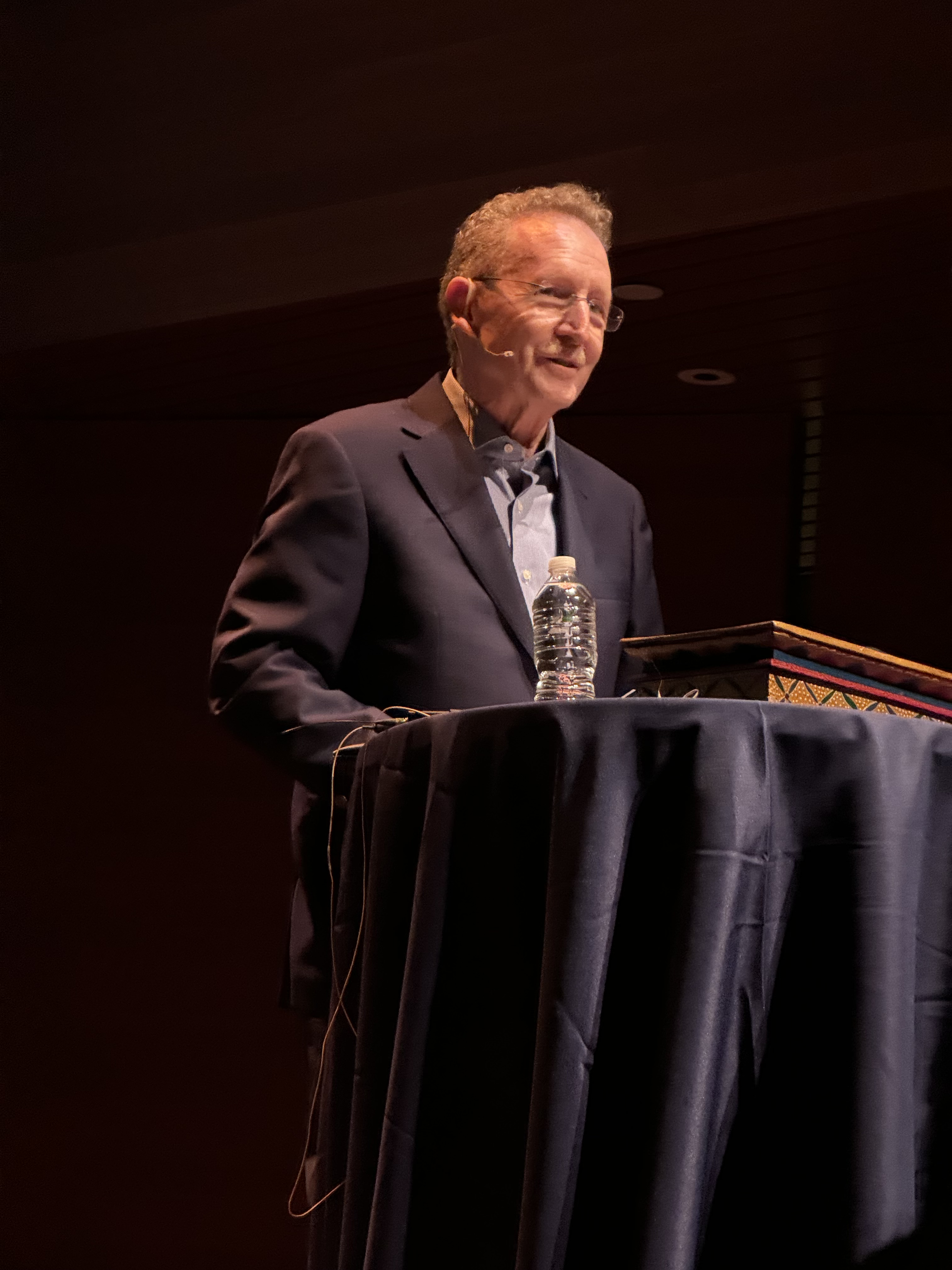
- Donald S. Lopez Jr. speaking at the Rubin Museum of Art in 2024

Personal life
- Born: 1952 (age 73–74) Washington, D.C.
- Education: University of Virginia
- Occupation: Professor of Buddhist and Tibetan studies author

Religious life
- Religion: Unknown

Senior posting
- Based in: University of Michigan

Donald Sewell Lopez Jr. (born 1952) is an American scholar of Buddhism and the Arthur E. Link Distinguished university professor of Buddhist and Tibetan Studies at the University of Michigan, in the Department of Asian Languages and Cultures.

== Life ==
Lopez was born in Washington, D.C., and is the son of U.S. Air Force pilot and Smithsonian Institution official Donald Lopez. He was educated at the University of Virginia, receiving a B.A. (Hons) in Religious Studies in 1974, an M.A. in Buddhist Studies in 1977, and his doctorate in Buddhist Studies in 1982. He is married to another prominent Religious Studies scholar, Tomoko Masuzawa.

Lopez is a Fellow of the American Academy of Arts and Sciences and has written and edited many books on various aspects of the religions of Asia. He specializes in late Indian Mahayana Buddhism and in Tibetan Buddhism and commands classical and colloquial Tibetan. In 2008, he gave four talks on The Scientific Buddha: Past, Present, Future as part of a Dwight H. Terry Lectureship at Yale University. In 2012, he delivered the Edwin O. Reischauer Lectures at Harvard, "The White Lama Ippolito".

He is a long-term associate of Yale professor of New Testament studies Dale Martin.

== Works ==
=== As author ===
- The Buddha: Biography of a Myth. Yale University Press. September 2, 2025. ISBN 9780300234275.
- Buddhism: A Journey Through History. Yale University Press. January 7, 2025. ISBN 9780300234268.
- Buddha Takes the Mound: Enlightenment in 9 Innings. St. Martin's Essentials. May 5, 2020. ISBN 9781250237910.
- Hyecho's Journey: The World of Buddhism. University of Chicago Press. 2017. ISBN 9780226517902
- In Search of the Christian Buddha: How an Asian Sage Became a Medieval Saint. With Peggy McCracken. W. W. Norton, April 7, 2014. ISBN 9780393089158.
- From Stone to Flesh: A Short History of the Buddha. The University of Chicago Press. April 11, 2013. ISBN 9780226493206.
- Gendun Chopel: Tibet's Modern Visionary (Lives of the Masters). Serindia Publications. 2013.
- The Scientific Buddha: His Short and Happy Life. Yale University Press. September 25, 2012. ISBN 978-0-300-15912-7.
- "The Tibetan Book of the Dead": A Biography. Princeton University Press. February 7, 2011. ISBN 978-1-4008-3804-2.
- Buddhism and Science: A Guide for the Perplexed. The University of Chicago Press. May 15, 2009. ISBN 978-0-226-49324-4.
- The Madman’s Middle Way: Reflections on Reality of the Tibetan Monk Gendun Chopel, The University of Chicago Press, 2005.
- Buddhism: An Introduction and Guide, Penguin UK, 2001; published in US as The Story of Buddhism, Harper: San Francisco, 2001
  - Italian translation, Che cos'è il Buddhismo, Rome, Ubaldini Editore, 2002.
  - Czech edition, 2003.
  - Spanish edition, 2009.
- Prisoners of Shangri-La: Tibetan Buddhism and the West. University of Chicago Press. May 1, 1999. ISBN 978-0-226-49311-4.
  - Italian translation, Prigionieri di Shangri-La, Rome, Ubaldini Editore, 1999.
  - French translation, Fascination tibétaine : du bouddhisme, de l'Occident et de quelques mythes, Paris, Éditions Autrement, 2003.
- Elaborations on Emptiness: Uses of the Heart Sutra, Princeton University Press, 1996; reprint edition, Munshiram Manoharlal, 1998.
- The Heart Sutra Explained: Indian and Tibetan Commentaries. SUNY Press. 1988. ISBN 978-0-88706-589-7.
- A Study of Svatantrika, Snow Lion Press, an imprint of Shambhala Publications, 1987.
- Co-authored and co-edited the award-winning The Princeton Dictionary of Buddhism. See § As editor for details.

=== As editor ===
- Donald S. Lopez Jr., ed. Strange Tales of an Oriental Idol: An Anthology of Early European Portrayals of the Buddha, University of Chicago Press, 2016. ISBN 9780226493183
- Robert E. Buswell Jr. & Donald S. Lopez Jr., authors and editors. The Princeton Dictionary of Buddhism, Princeton University Press, 2013, ISBN 9780691157863.
- Donald S. Lopez Jr., ed. Critical Terms for the Study of Buddhism. University of Chicago Press, 2005, ISBN 9780226493145
- Donald S. Lopez Jr., ed. Religions of Asia in Practice, Princeton University Press, 2002, ISBN 9780691090603.
- Donald S. Lopez Jr., ed. A Modern Buddhist Bible: Essential Readings from East and West. Beacon Press, 2002, ISBN 9780807012437
- Donald S. Lopez Jr., ed. Religions of Tibet in Practice, Princeton University Press, 1997, ISBN 9780691011844.
- Donald S. Lopez Jr., ed. Religions of China in Practice, Princeton University Press, 1996. ISBN 9780691021447
- Donald S. Lopez Jr., ed. Religions of India in Practice. Princeton University Press, 1995, ISBN 9780691043258
- Donald S. Lopez Jr., ed. Buddhism in Practice, Princeton University Press, 1995, ISBN 978-8121508322. Abridged edition, 2007, ISBN 978-0691129686.
- Donald S. Lopez Jr., ed. Curators of the Buddha: The Study of Buddhism Under Colonialism. University of Chicago Press, 1995, ISBN 9780226493084
- Donald S. Lopez Jr., ed. Buddhist Hermeneutics. University of Hawai'i Press, 1992. ISBN 9780824814472

== See also ==
- Buddhism and science
- Shangri-la
- New Age Orientalism
