= Buddhabhūmi Sūtra =

The Buddhabhūmi-sūtra (Scripture on the Buddha Land, Ch: 佛說佛地經, Taishō Tripitaka no. 680) is an Indian Mahayana Buddhist sutra. The Buddhabhūmi-sūtra is associated with the Yogācāra school of Buddhism, and possibly the texts of the Maitreya corpus, especially the Mahāyānasūtrālamkāra, which shares some verses with the sutra.

== Main themes ==
The main topic of the text is that a Buddha's buddhafield (buddhakṣetra) or pure land is ultimately a name for Buddha knowledge (jñāna), consisting of five factors or five jñānas. These are the Pure Dharma Realm (or Suchness, Dharmadhatu, the ultimate truth) and the four jñānas: mirror-like knowledge (ādarśa-jñāna), knowledge of sameness (samatā-jñāna), investigative knowledge (pratyavekṣaṇa-jñāna) and the knowledge of accomplishing activities (kṛty-anuṣṭhāna-jñāna). As such, it remains an important source for Indian ideas about a Buddha's knowledge and their pure land.

The Buddhabhūmi-sūtra also briefly teaches the Yogācāra doctrine of the triple embodiment of the Buddha (Trikāya), being of the earliest sutras to teach the triple embodiment theory.

The sutra also seems to be one of the first instances of the Yogācāra school's six categories of Buddhahood: (1) essential nature (svabhāva), (2) cause (hetu), (3) result (phala), (4) action (karman), (5) endowment (yoga), and function (vṛtti).

== Textual history ==
Since the Buddhabhūmi-sūtra shares a set of verses with the Mahāyānasūtrālamkāra, it may predate this treatise. Or the opposite might be true, and the sutra may have borrowed them from the Mahāyānasūtrālamkāra. It is also possible that both texts borrowed these verses from a third source. Whatever the case, the sutra may be tentatively dated to around the 4th century CE.

The Buddhabhūmi-sūtra was first translated into Chinese by Xuanzang and his translation team in 645 CE (as the 佛說佛地經, T680). It was also translated into the Tibetan Canon (Derge catalogue no. 275, folio 37a.5-6).

Two Yogācāra commentaries were written on this sutra, Śīlabhadra's (529–645) Buddhabhūmi-vyākhyāna and the Buddhabhūmyupadeśa which is attributed to the Indian Bandhuprabha. Since the latter text attributed to Bandhuprabha seems to draw on Xuanzang's 7th century Chéng Wéishí Lùn, this commentary may have been written in China or it may have been written in India based on an Indian edition of the Chéng Wéishí Lùn.

The Buddhabhūmi-vyākhyāna identifies each of the four jñānas with one of the three embodiments while seeing the "Purified Dharma-realm" (dharmadhātuviśuddhi) as a term for all Buddhahood and all three bodies together. According to the Buddhabhūmi-vyākhyāna, the identification of the three embodiments with the four knowledges or gnoses is as follows:

- Dharmakāya (dharma body) = mirror-like gnosis
- Sambhogakāya (co-enjoyment body) = the gnosis of sameness and the gnosis of investigation
- Nirmāṇakāya (manifestation body) = the gnosis of accomplishing activities

Furthermore, both Sthiramati's and Asvabhava's commentaries to the Mahāyānasūtrālamkāra refer to the Buddhabhūmi-sūtra and quote it extensively.

== See also ==
- Laṅkāvatāra Sūtra
- Ghanavyūha Sūtra

== Bibliography ==
- Buswell, Robert E. Lopez Jr. Donald S. The Princeton Dictionary of Buddhism, Princeton University Press, 2013.
- Keenan, John P. A Study of the Buddhabhūmyupadeś́a: The Doctrinal Development of the Notion of Wisdom in Yogācāra Thought. Institute of Buddhist Studies and Bukkyō Dendō Kyōkai America, 2014
- Makransky, John J. (1997). Buddhahood Embodied: Sources of Controversy in India and Tibet. State University of New York Press. ISBN 0-7914-3432-X.
