= Pure Land =

Abode of a buddha or bodhisattva in Mahayana Buddhism

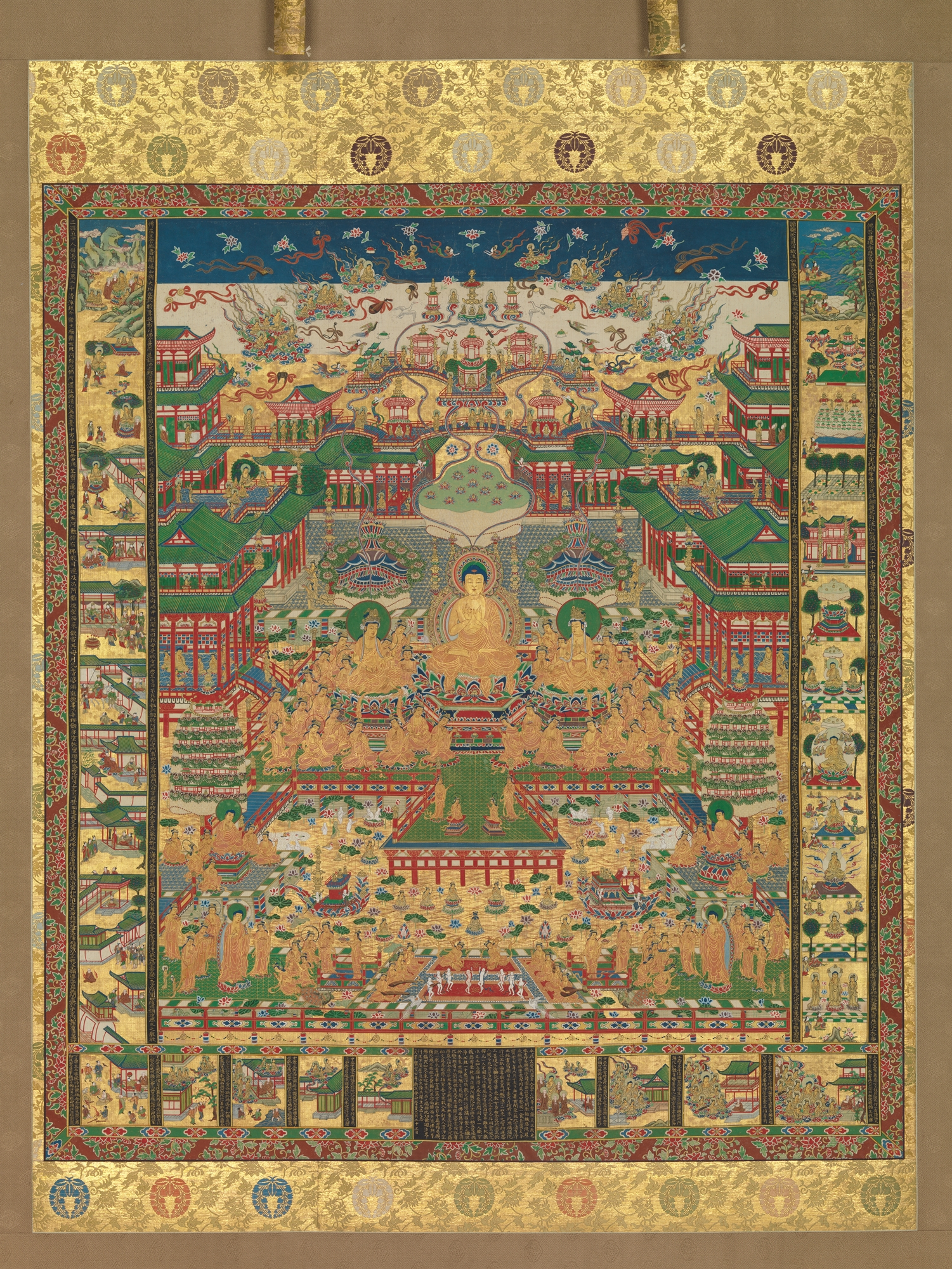
Japanese copy of the Pure Land Taima Mandala, which depicts Sukhavati, the most popular Pure Land destination in East Asian Buddhism, hanging scroll from 1750.

Pure Land is a Buddhist concept referring to a transcendent realm emanated by a buddha or bodhisattva which has been purified by their activity and sustaining power. It is especially important in Mahayana Buddhism, where Pure Lands are seen as places beyond the three planes of existence without the sufferings of samsara, where one can meet a buddha in person. Many Mahayana Buddhists aspire to be reborn in a buddha's pure land after death.

The term "Pure Land" is common in East Asian Buddhist sources (Chinese: 淨土; pinyin: Jìngtǔ). Sanskrit Buddhist sources contain the equivalent concept under terms such as buddha-field (buddhakṣetra) or more technically a pure buddha-field (Sanskrit: viśuddha-buddhakṣetra, pariśuddha‑kṣetra, kṣetraṃ viśuddham, etc). It is also known by the Sanskrit term buddhabhūmi (buddha-land). In Tibetan Buddhism meanwhile, the term "pure realms" (Tibetan: དག་པའི་ཞིང Wylie: dag pa'i zhing) is also used as a synonym for buddhakṣetra.

The various traditions that focus on attaining rebirth in a Pure Land are often called Pure Land Buddhism. The English term is ambiguous. It can refer to a way of practice which is found in most Mahayana traditions which employ various means to attain birth in a pure land. This specific concept is termed the "Pure Land Dharma gate" (Chinese: 淨土法門; pinyin: jìngtǔ fǎmén) in East Asian Buddhism. The English term can also refer to specific Buddhist schools or sects which focus on Pure Land practice. Specifically these would be termed Jìngtǔzōng (淨土宗) in Chinese and Jōdo bukkyō in Japanese.

Pure Lands are also found in the non-Buddhist traditions of Taoism and Bon.

== In South Asian sources ==
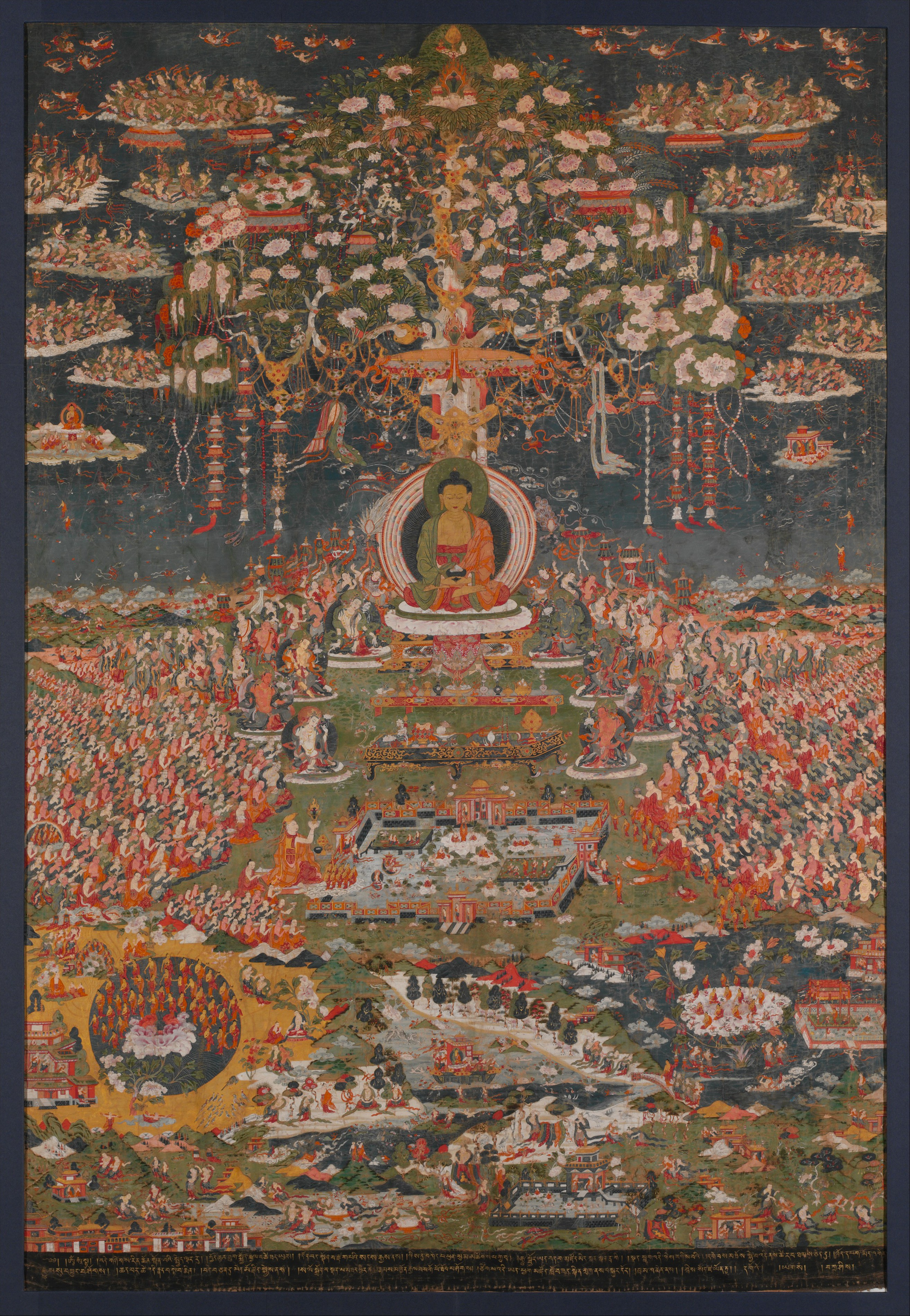
Tibetan painting of Amitabha in Sukhavati, c. 1700

The Indic term buddhakṣetra referred to the place or range where a buddha teaches and exerts his enlightening influence. According to Zhutayev, the idea "is usually, but incorrectly, thought of as a specifically Mahāyāna concept". Instead, buddhakṣetra is a pan-buddhist idea with both spatial and soteriological dimensions found in all major Buddhist traditions.

According to Teresina Rowell, early Buddhist ideas such as khetta, buddhavisaya and buddhagocara may have influenced the buddhafield idea. Buddhavisaya ("buddha-domain") refers to a power, field of knowledge or domain available only to a buddha. Buddhagocara is a buddha's "range" of activity (which is described as infinite: anantagocaram), gocara being a term that literally means "pasture". Furthermore, the Dhammasaṅgaṇī mentions how khetta is metaphor for the "sphere of vision". When discussing a buddha's vision, their visaya-khetta is infinite, and refers to omniscient (sabbavid) knowledge of the whole cosmos (lokavid). Other sutras also discuss the buddha's field of beneficent influence, which is depicted as a set of worlds which shake when a buddha is born (other sources mention various other brilliant and miraculous displays such the sick being healed etc.). This indicates a range or field that a buddha's power extends over and physically affects. This influence also included the concept of paritta, a spiritual force that protects beings who take refuge in the Buddha (and can be embodied in texts to be recited).

The development of the Pure Land idea was also closely informed by the Indian Buddhist cosmology of the heavenly realms (devaloka), which were seen as suitable goal to aspire to, especially for Buddhist laypersons. Bodhisattvas like Maitreya are also said to be reborn in the heavens, where they await to be reborn on earth to attain their final enlightenment. In both Mahayana and non-Mahayana sources, the worship of the buddhas through stupas, and buddha-mindfulness was seen as a means of attaining a higher rebirth. Practices aimed at a higher birth even included calling out "Namo Buddhaya" as death approached, a practice that mirrors East Asian Pure Land practice. This practice is described in non-Mahayana sources like the Divyāvadāna, which attributes its salvific power to the “power of the Buddha.”

The Mahāvastu, an early Mahāsāṃghika text, defines a buddha-field (buddhakṣetra) as a realm where "a tathagata, a holy one, fully and perfectly enlightened, is to be found, lives, exists and teaches the Dharma, for the benefit and happiness of the great body of beings, men and gods." It also lists various buddhafields and their buddhas, and concludes by saying, "There are numerous thousands of buddhakṣetra over and above these; Of the thousands of buddhakṣetra, the end-limit is not to be discerned.". This is one of the earliest non-Mahayana depictions of the buddhafield concept.

Over time, the idea that buddhas purify certain realms with their benevolent powers became widespread. These special realms became destinations for beings to seek rebirth in. The Indian Mahayana sutras describe many such pure buddha-fields. Mahayana sources hold that there are an infinite number of buddhas, each with their own buddha-fields where they teach the Dharma and where sentient beings can be reborn into (due to their good karmic acts). A "purified buddha-field" (Sanskrit: pariśuddhaṃ buddhakṣetram) is a place free of evil, trouble, and disaster, which is described as having an array (vyuha) of good qualities (guna). As such, it is a place where bodhisattvas can easily progress on the bodhisattva path.

Sentient beings who are reborn in a pure buddha-field due to their good karma also contribute to the development of that buddha-field, as can bodhisattvas who are able to travel there. Buddha-fields are therefore powerful places which are very advantageous to spiritual progress. Jan Nattier has argued that the idea of a pure land became popular as a response to the extreme length and the difficulty of the traditional bodhisattva path, which took thousands of eons (kalpas) across many rebirths. Because of this grueling spiritual path which took countless lives to complete, training under a buddha in a pure buddha-field came to be seen as an easier way to buddhahood.

Mahayana Sutras like the Lotus Sutra, the Vimalakīrtinirdeśa, Bhaiṣajyaguru Sutra, and the Aṣṭasāhasrikā Prajñāpāramitā all use Sanskrit terms for the purity of a buddha‑field (buddhakṣetra‑pariśuddhi) and terms which indicate a "pure" or "purified" buddhafield, such as: viśuddha-kṣetraṃ, pariśuddha-kṣetra, śuddha-buddhakṣetra, viśuddha-buddhakṣetra, and pariśuddha-buddhakṣetra. The term is also found in the Sanskrit edition of the Larger Pure Land Sutra, which speaks of Dharmakara bodhisattva's bringing to fulfillment of "such purity of the buddha-field, such majesty of the buddha-field, and such vastness of the buddha-field" (buddhakṣetrapariśuddhiṃ buddhakṣetramāhātmyaṃ buddhakṣetrodāratāṃ).

According to Indian sources, the bodhisattva path, by ending all defilements, culminates in the arising of a purified buddha-field, which is the manifestation and reflection of a Buddha's activity. Mahayana sources state that bodhisattvas like Avalokiteśvara and Manjushri will obtain their own buddha-fields after they attain full buddhahood. In the Lotus Sutra, Buddha's close followers, such as Śāriputra, Mahākāśyapa, Subhūti, Maudgalyāyana and Buddha's son Rāhula are also predicted to attain their own Pure Lands. The relative time-flow in the Pure Lands may be different, with a day in one Pure Land being equivalent to years in another.

=== Purity of buddha-fields ===
Mahayana sources speak of three kinds of buddha-fields: pure, impure, and mixed. According to Kotatsu Fujita, Indian Buddhist texts contain terms such as buddhakṣetra‑pariśuddhi (“the purification of the buddha land”) or pariśuddhaṃ buddhakṣetram (“purified buddha land”), as well as apariśuddhaṃ buddhakṣetram (“unpurified buddha land”) and kliṣṭaṃ buddhakṣetram (“tainted buddha land”) in the Karuṇāpuṇḍarīka Sūtra. Fujita writes that, "It was in accordance with such usage that jingtu and huitu were established in Chinese as technical terms." The most popular example of a pure land is Sukhāvatī, the pure land of Amitabha. The Sanskrit of the Samantabhadracaryāpraṇidhāna describes Sukhāvatī as a "exceedingly pure buddha‑land" (pariśuddha‑buddhakṣetra), and also as a "pure land" (viśuddhakṣetra).

An example of an "impure" field is often this world (called Sahā – “the world to be endured"), Sakyamuni's field. Purified fields include Amitabha's buddha-field of Sukhavati. Some sutras say that Sakyamuni chose to come to an impure world due to his vast compassion. However, not all Mahayana texts agree that Sakyamuni's world is impure. Numerous Mahayana sutras, such as the Pañcaviṃśatisāhasrikā prajñāpāramitā, Lankavatara, Vimalakirti, and Lotus Sutras, also state that this dualism between purity and impurity is illusory and instead state that even this world is a pure buddha-field.

Thus, according to the Vimalakirti, this seemingly impure world is actually pure. It only appears impure because the deluded and impure minds of sentient beings perceive it like that. As Paul Williams explains: "The impurity that we see is the result of impure awareness, and also the Buddha's compassion in creating a world within which impure beings can grow. Thus the real way to attain a Pure Land is to purify one's own mind. Put another way, we are already in the Pure Land if we but knew it. Whatever the realm, if it is inhabited by people with enlightened pure minds then it is a Pure Land."

Numerous Mahayana sources also connect the concept of a purified buddhafield (pariśuddha-buddhakṣetra) with the purity of one's own mind. Hence, the Vimalakirti sutra states: "the bodhisattva who wishes to purify his buddhakṣetra should, first of all, skillfully adorn his own mind. And why? Because to the extent that the mind of a bodhisattva is pure is his buddhakṣetra purified."

=== Iconography ===
Nakamura (1980, 1987: p. 207) establishes the Indian background of the padma imagery of the field which is evident iconographically, as well as in motif and metaphor:

The descriptions of Pure Land in Pure Land sutras were greatly influenced by Brahmin and Hindu ideas and the topological situation in India. There was a process of the development of lotus (padma)-symbolism in Pure Land Buddhism. The final outcome of the thought was as follows: the aspirants of faith and assiduity are born transformed (anupapāduka) in the lotus flowers. But those with doubts are born into the lotus-buds. They stay in the calyx of a lotus (garbhāvāsa) for five hundred years without seeing or hearing the Three Treasures. Within the closed lotus-flowers they enjoy pleasures as though they were playing in a garden or palace.

— Nakamura Hajime (Nakamura 1980, p. 207)

=== In Pāḷi sources ===
The Theravadin Pāḷi literature, including the Pāḷi Canon, contains various references to "Buddha-fields" (buddhakhetta). One example is a Pāḷi Canon text called Buddhāpadāna (found in the Khuddaka-Nikāya) which discusses the nature of Buddha-fields where many other buddhas reside, describing it as a kind of palace decorated with amazing features like many jewels and lotus flowers. The text states that there are numerous buddhas with such fields in the ten directions, "as many as are there the numerous jewels, both in the heaven above and on the earth below."

Another Pāḷi text, the Buddhavamsa, describes how the Buddha is able to use his supernormal powers to generate jewelled walkways and pillars for the benefit of others.

Buddhaghosa in his Vishuddhimagga discusses three types of Buddha-fields, which may be pure, impure, or mixed:

1. The birth-field (jāti-khetta) of a Buddha, which comprises 10,000 worlds, all of which shake when a specific Buddha is born.
2. The "field of authority" of a Buddha (āṇā-khetta), which spans 100,000 koṭīs.
3. The field of the cognitive domain of a Buddha (visaya-khetta), which is infinite.

== Mahayana Pure Lands ==
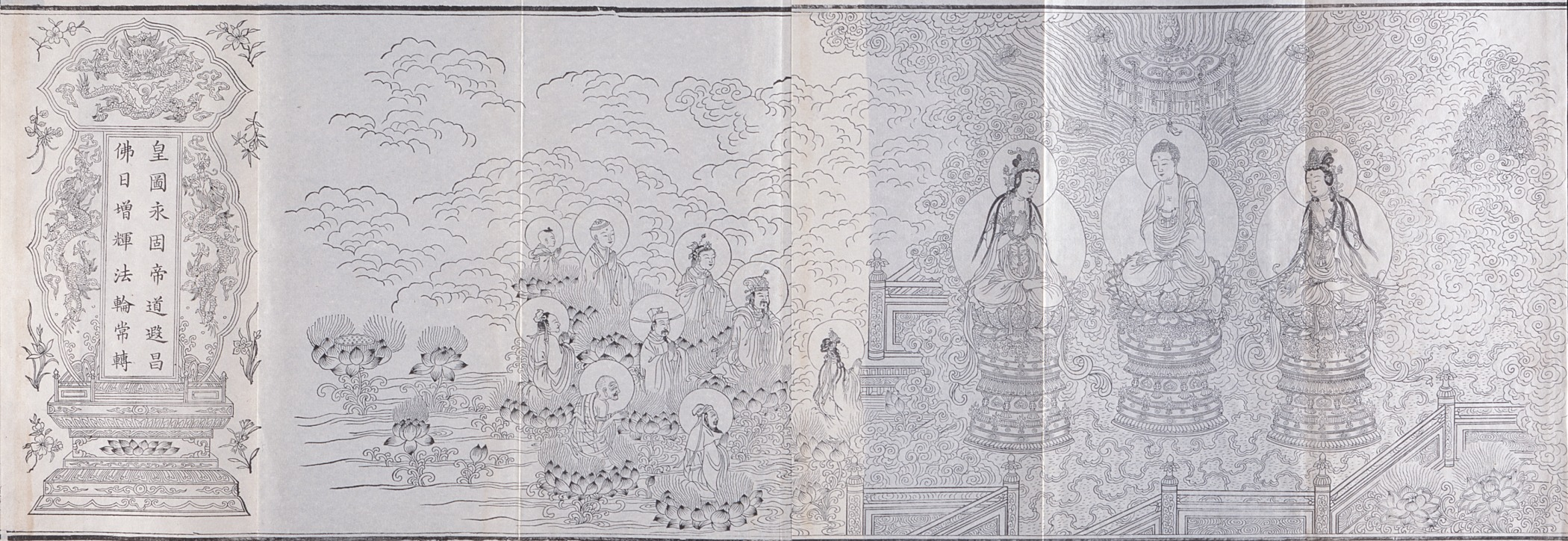
Frontispiece of the 1718 Rules for Repenting and Rebirth in the Pure Land (Wangsheng Jingtu Chanyuan Yikuei)

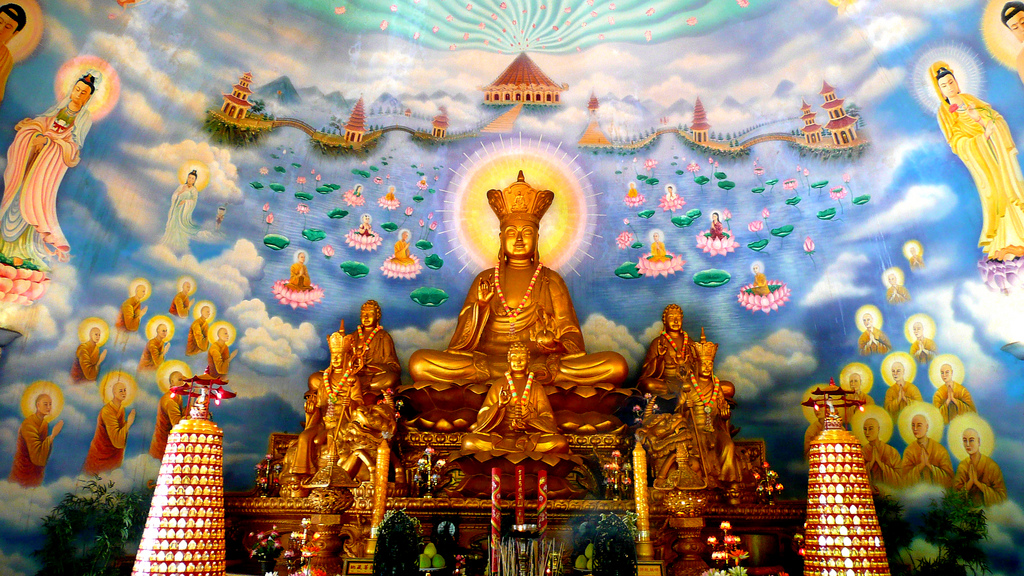
Vietnamese depiction of Ksitigarbha in Sukhavati

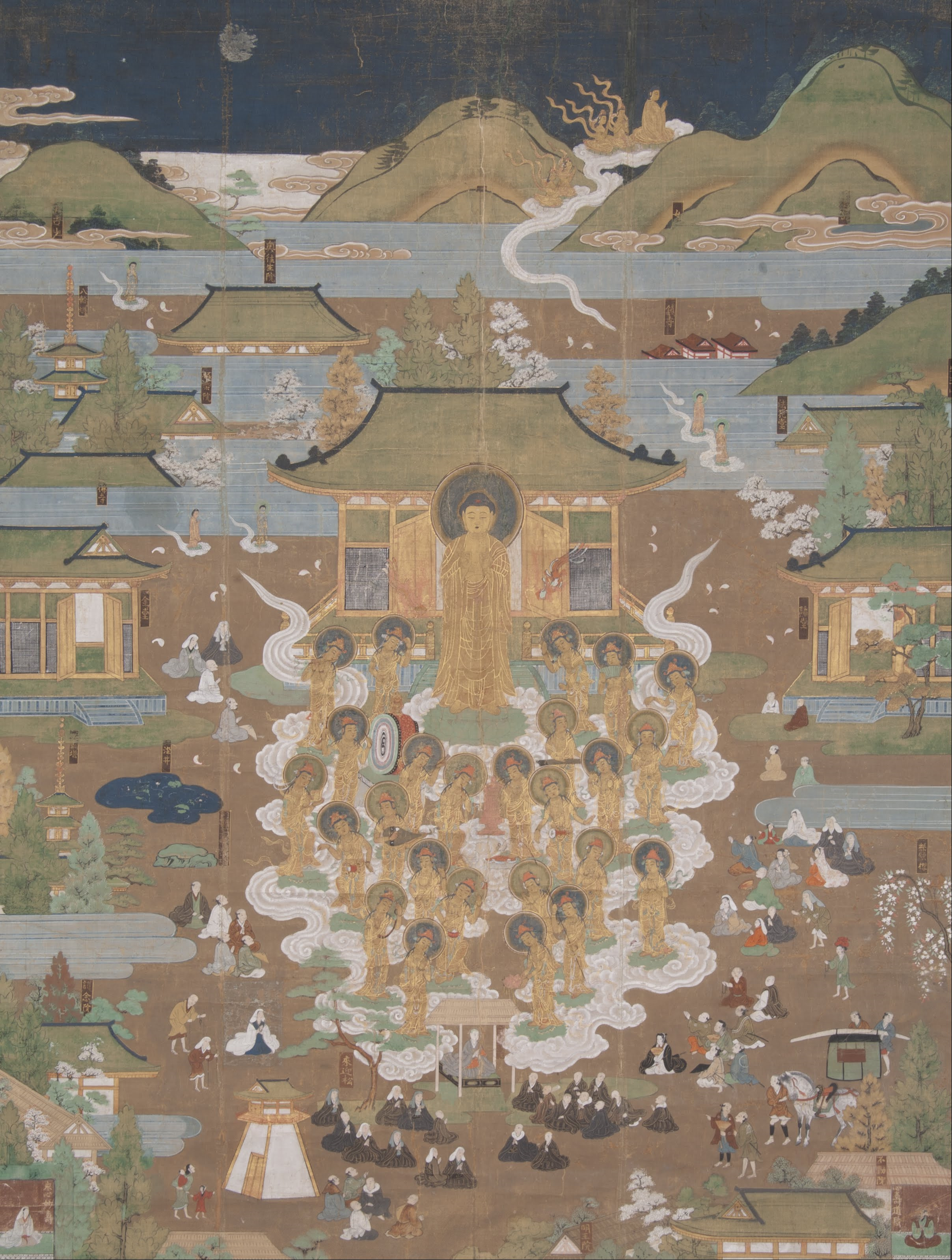
A Muromachi period scroll showing Amida welcoming Chûjô-hime to the pure land, Taima Temple, Japan

=== Amitābha's Sukhāvatī ===
Sukhāvatī ("The Blissful") is by far the most popular pure land in East Asian Mahayana Buddhism. It is also the main goal of Pure Land Buddhism, which is centered around faith and devotion to Amitābha Buddha as the means of attaining rebirth in his pure land. It is also a popular pure land in Tibetan Buddhism as well. The key canonical teachings on Sukhāvatī are found in the "three pure land sutras", the main sources for East Asian Pure Land Buddhism: the Smaller Sukhāvatī-vyūha (T 366), the Longer Sukhāvatīvyūha Sūtra, and the Amitayus Contemplation Sutra (i.e. The Contemplation Sutra).

According to Mahayana scriptures, in his past life, Amitabha was a devoted king of a joyous kingdom in a distant eon who renounced his throne to become a monk and vowed to attain buddhahood. He made forty-eight vows which focus on the greatness of his future pure land, pledging that he would not accept buddhahood if any of these vows went unfulfilled. The vows are dedicated to establishing a pure realm accessible to all beings who aspired to be reborn there. This monk would ultimately become Buddha Amitabha. His vows were grounded in hearing his name ("Amitabha"), establishing virtue, and dedicating merit toward rebirth in this pure land.

Some Mahayana sutra teachings say that after Amitabha attains final nirvana, the successors of Amitabha in Sukhāvatī will be Avalokiteśvara, followed by Mahāsthāmaprāpta.

There are numerous East Asian texts discussing the various experiences of Pure Land Buddhists who have gone to the Pure land or had a vision of Sukhavati. Some Buddhists and followers of other religions claimed to have seen Sukhavati and numerous East Asian popular faiths and cults also discuss Sukhavati.

=== Śākyamuni's Pure Lands ===
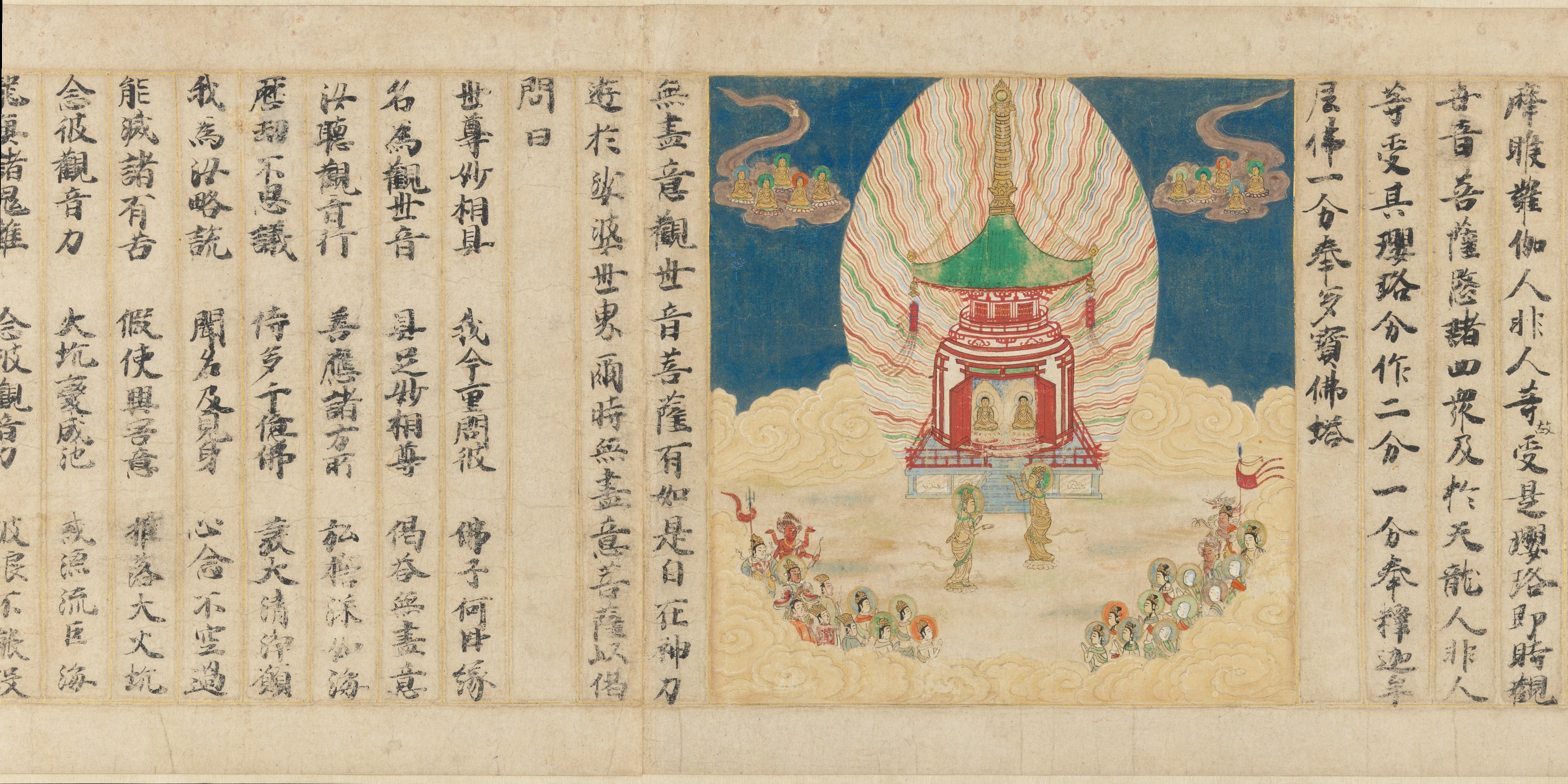
The Assembly in Space above Vulture Peak; from an illustrated Lotus Sutra, c. 1257.

The Mahāyāna Mahāparinirvāṇa Sūtra states that Śākyamuni Buddha has his own Pure Land which is far in the western direction. According to Charles Jones "this land is called “Unsurpassable” (Wúshèng 無勝) because it is the equal of both the western Land of Peace and Bliss (Ānlè shìjiè 安樂世界) and the eastern Land of the Full Moon (Mǎnyuè shìjiè 滿月世界). From his base in that pure land, Śākyamuni manifests in this world of Jambudvīpa in order to turn the wheel of dharma and save all its sentient beings (T.374.12:508c25–509a4)."

Śākyamuni Buddha is also associated with the assembly in open space over Vulture Peak, which is the site of the preaching of the Lotus Sutra and many other Mahayana sutras. This is considered to be a kind of Pure Land on earth. Tiantai tradition holds that while the founder Zhiyi was chanting the Lotus Sutra, he had a vision of this pure assembly. His teacher Nanyue Huisi is said to have told Zhiyi that they had met in a previous life at this assembly. The Japanese monk Nichiren taught his disciples that through faith in the Lotus Sutra, one could be reborn in the pure land of Vulture Peak after death, promoting it as an alternative postmortem destination to Sukhavati.

Japanese Buddhist schools like Tendai and Nichiren Buddhism see Śākyamuni's pure land as being continuous with this world. This becomes pronounced in Nichiren Buddhism, which affirms the non-duality of this world and the pure land of Vulture peak. Even when addressing one's postmortem destination, Nichiren insisted that the "pure land of Vulture Peak"—while including the deceased faithful—is also a sacred reality accessible in this world through faith in the Lotus Sutra. For Nichiren, the samsaric world itself, when properly understood and engaged through faith, is the eternally abiding pure land. This leads to the attainment of buddhahood in one's present body (sokushin jōbutsu), without rejecting samsara or aspiring to a realm beyond it. This pure land was also associated with the Land of Tranquil Light (jakkōdo 寂光土), the supreme pure land in the Tiantai system.

=== Pure Lands of Buddha Vairocana ===
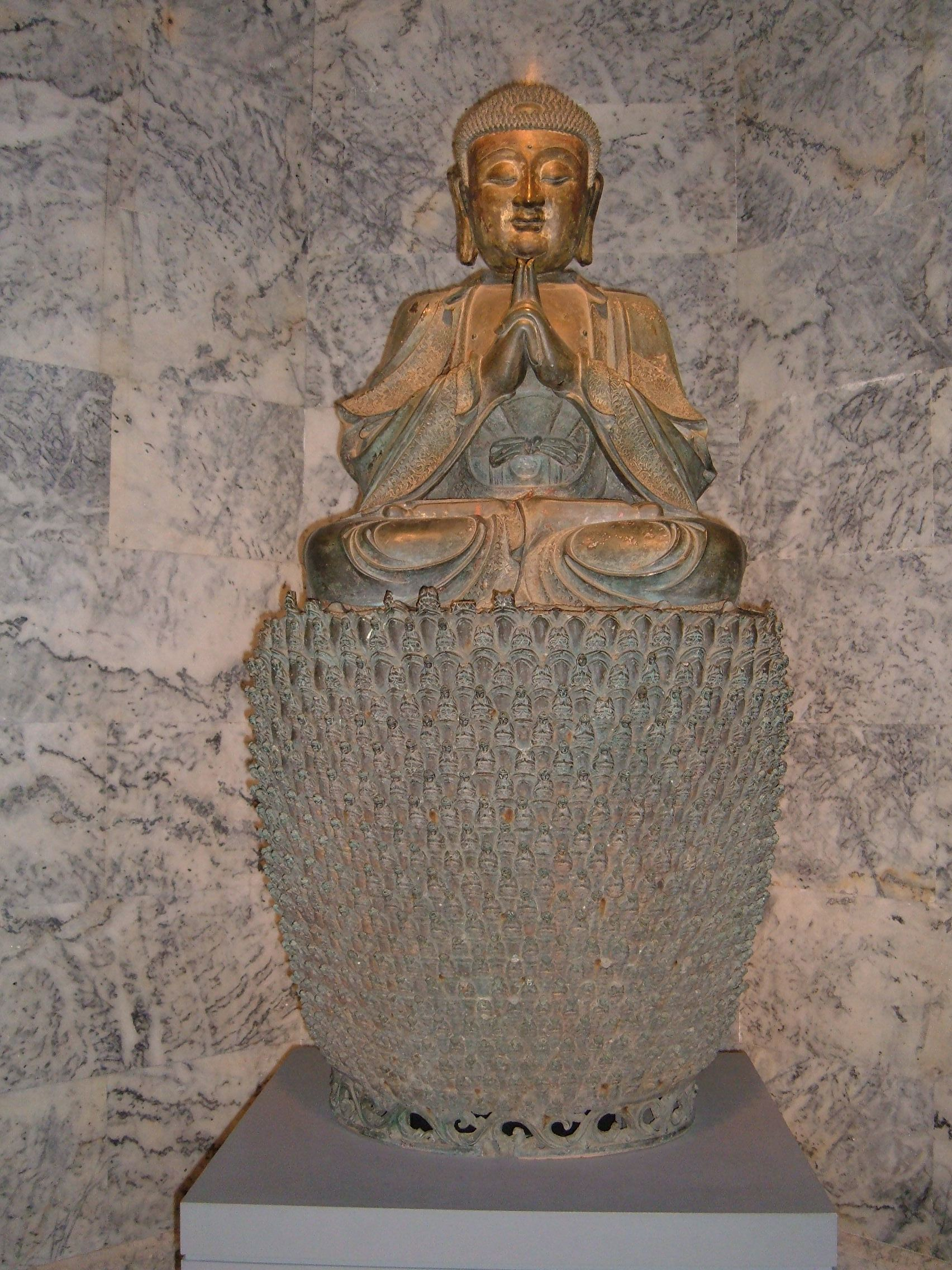
Ming era statue of Vairocana Buddha on a thousand petaled lotus.

According to the Buddhāvataṃsaka Sūtra, the whole universe is a vast pure buddha-field which has been purified by the cosmic Vairocana Buddha. This is the view of Pure Land which is found in the Chinese Huayan tradition and in Chinese Esoteric Buddhism. According to this view, our world is just one small part of this universal Pure Land which is named: "Ocean of worlds, whose surface and inside are decorated with an arrangement of flowers" (Sanskrit: Kusumatalagarbha-vyūhālamkāra-lokadhātusamudra). It is also called the "Lotus Treasury World" (Chinese: 華蔵世界, Skt. Padmagarbha-lokadhātu), since it is an array of billions of worlds in a lotus flower shape.

Furthermore, Ghanavyūha ("Dense Array" or "Secret Adornment") is considered to be the supreme pure buddhafield specific to Vairocana. It appears in Mahayana sutras like the Ghanavyūha Sutra. According to this sutra, by following virtuous teachers, hearing and contemplating Buddha Dharma, and letting go of all concepts and craving, one can be reborn there, achieve enlightenment, and manifest in countless ways to help all beings.

In East Asian Esoteric Buddhist traditions, like Shingon, the dual mandalas of the Vajradhatu and Garbhadhatu mandalas are considered to be the representation of the buddhafield of Mahāvairocana Buddha, the supreme cosmic Buddha.

=== Inner court of Tuṣita ===
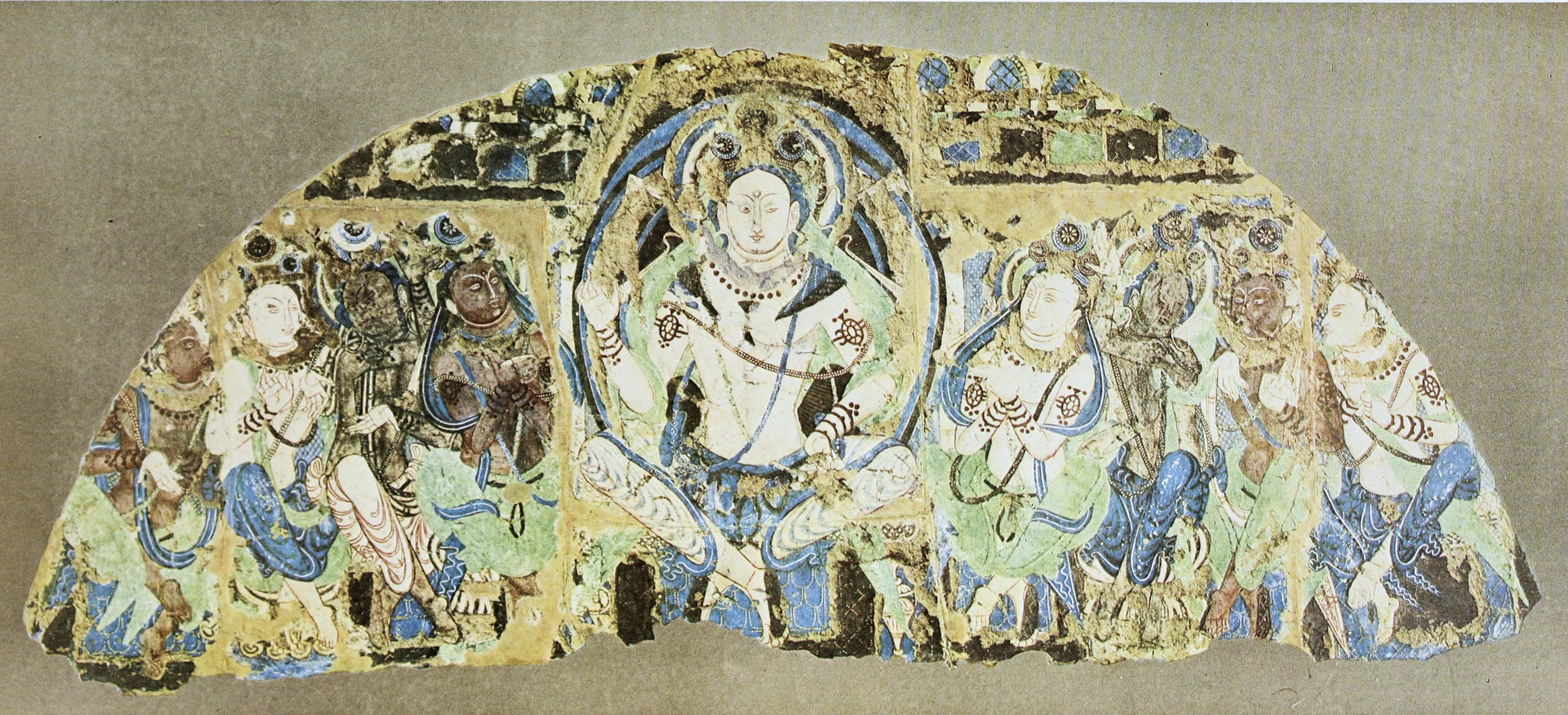
Maitreya in Tushita Heaven, over the entrance of Maya Cave, Kizil, Xinjiang, China.

The "Inner Court of Tushita" (兜率內院) is Maitreya's pure land, which is actually located in the deva realm of Tuṣita. Some Buddhist scriptures teach that Maitreya is currently teaching at the Inner Court of Tuṣita. Some Buddhist Masters, such as Xuanzang, expressed a wish to be reborn there.

Other Buddhist monks, such as Xuyun, also aspired to be reborn in the Inner Court of Tuṣita in order to meet Maitreya.

The Inner Court of Tuṣita was historically a popular place for Buddhists to wish to be reborn in; however, the vast majority of Pure Land Buddhists today hope to be reborn in Sukhavati.

Some followers of the Chinese Salvationist religion called Yiguandao have also claimed to have traveled there.

=== Pure Lands of the Five Tathāgatas ===
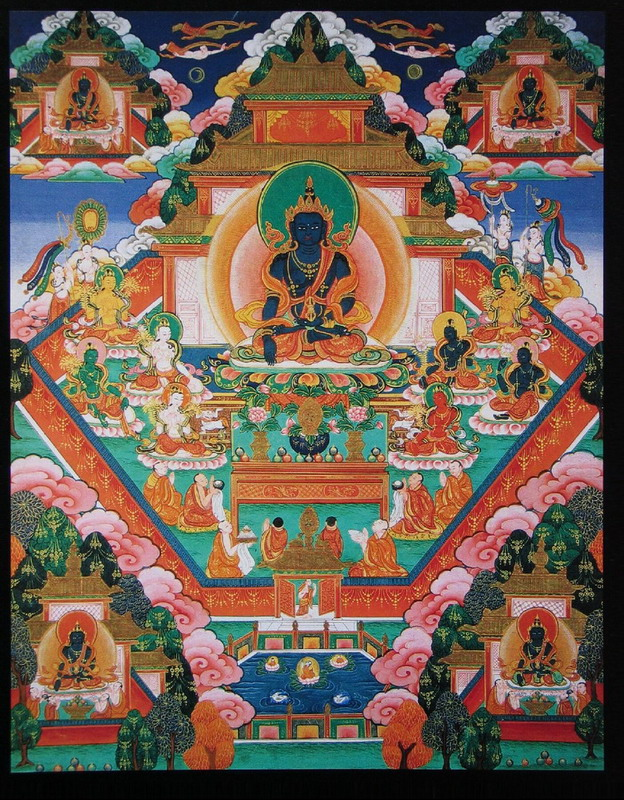
A Tibetan illustration of Abhirati, Aksobhya's pure land

Later Indian Buddhism developed a schema of five main Buddhas (called the Five Tathāgatas). In this schema, which is popular in Esoteric Buddhism and is organized as a mandala, there the five Pure Lands of the five key Buddhas are:

- In the center, Akaniṣṭha-Ghanavyūha, hosted by Vairocana Buddha. In Tibetan Buddhism, Ghanavyūha Akaniṣṭha is the supreme Saṃbhogakāya buddhafield of Vajradhara, out of which emanate all Nirmāṇakāya Buddhas and Buddhafields such as Sukhāvati.
- In the East, Abhirati, hosted by Akṣobhya Buddha
- In the South, Śrīmat, hosted by Ratnasaṃbhava Buddha
- In the West, Sukhāvatī, hosted by Amitābha Buddha
- In the North, Karmaprasiddhi or Prakuṭā, hosted by Amoghasiddhi Buddha

=== Other identified Pure Lands ===
- Abhirati ("Joyous") is the buddhafield of Akshobhya Buddha, located in the eastern direction. This pure land is suggested by some scholars to be the earliest buddhafield mentioned in Mahayana sutras.
- Vaidūryanirbhāsa (“Pure Blue Beryl”, Ch: 東方淨琉璃世界) of Bhaiṣajyaguru in the east is compared by some Pure Land Buddhists to Amitabha's Pure Land in the west. Bhaiṣajyaguru is also said to have manifestations in six other Pure Lands.
- Vimala ("Spotless", "World Without Filth") is the pure land of bodhisattva Manjushri.
- The city Ketumati is also described as Maitreya's future Pure Land on earth.
- The female bodhisattva Tara was also held to have a pure land, either termed Khadiravaṇa (Acacia Forest) or "Turquoise Leaf Land" (Tibetan: Yulokod).
- Zangdok Palri (Glorious Copper Colored Mountain) the Pure Land of Padmasambhava described in Tibetan sources. Dudjom Rinpoche said it was prophesied that all who had taken refuge in Padmasambhava or anyone who had any sort of connection with him would be reborn in Zangdok Palri.
- Shambhala, a pure land in the Vajrayana Buddhist Kalachakra cycle of tantras and teachings.
- The pure land of Vajrayogini, called Khechara or Dhagpa Khadro.

== In East Asian Buddhism ==
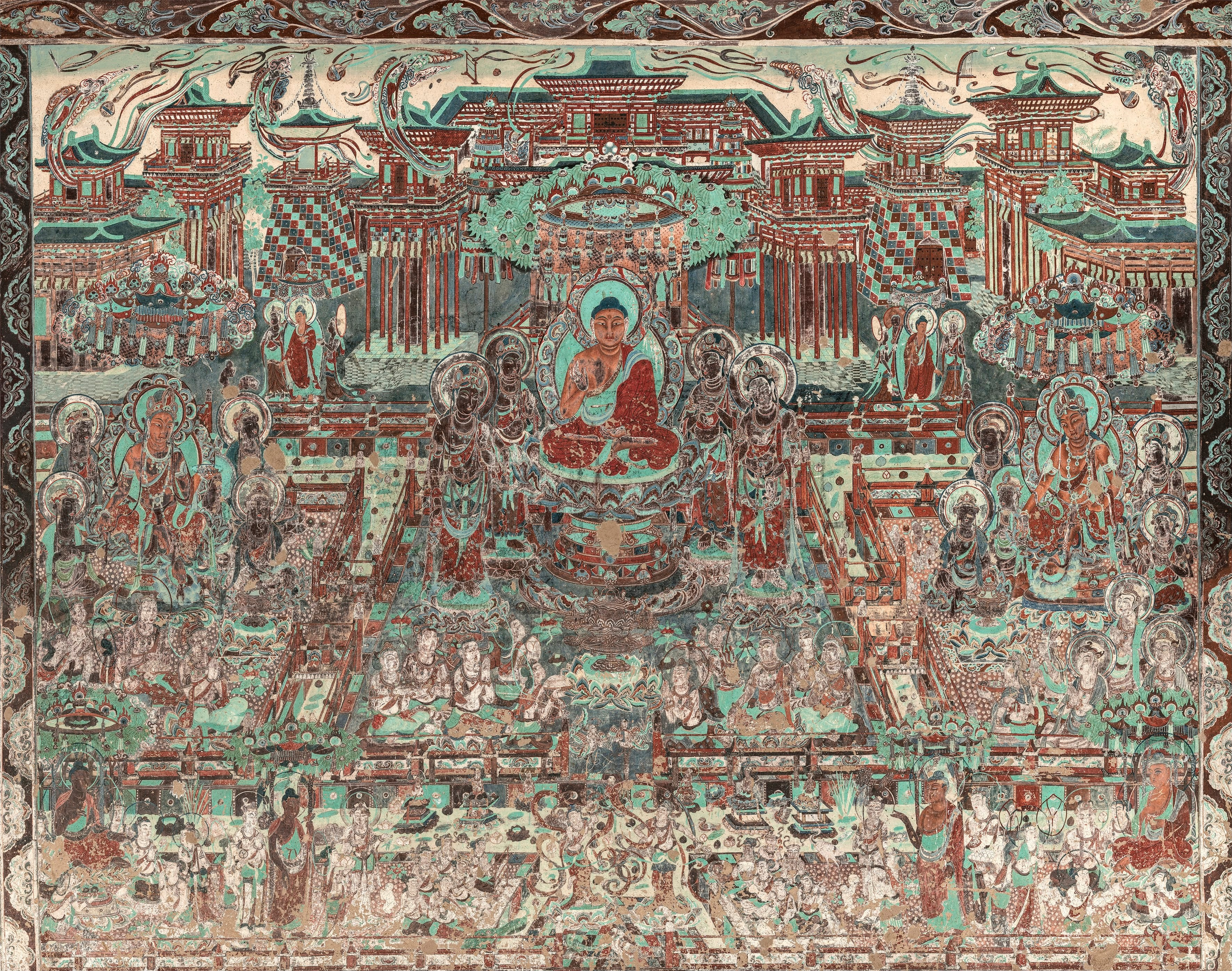
Amitayus Pure Land, from Mogao Cave, Dunhuang, Tang Dynasty (707-710)

=== Transcendent land vs non-dual land ===
In Chinese Buddhism, the Pure Land was commonly seen as a transcendent realm beyond the three realms (the desire realm, form realm and formless realm) into which one can be reborn after death. This view is also called "other direction" or "western direction" pure land. This view of the Pure Land as an actual realm or place was defended by masters of Pure Land Buddhism like Shandao.

Another interpretation of a Pure Land is that it is non-dual with our world since the whole world is mind-only. The Vimalakīrti Sutra was widely cited by exponents of this non-dual view of the Pure Land, often called "mind-only" Pure Land (wéixīn jìngtǔ 唯心淨土). This was commonly defended by masters of the Chan / Zen school, but was also accepted by some figures in various traditions including in Tiantai, Pure Land, Yogacara, Zen, and Nichiren Buddhism. Another sutra which teaches the view that the pure land is mainly a kind of pure mind or wisdom (i.e. the five wisdoms) is the Buddhabhūmi-sūtra (Scripture on the Buddha Land, Ch: 佛說佛地經, Taishō Tripitaka no. 680).

In the Platform Sutra for example, Huineng states that only the deluded hope to be born in a faraway land in the west, while the wise who know their nature is empty seek the Pure Land by purifying their minds. These two views of the Pure Land led to many debates in Chinese Buddhism.

In a similar fashion, according to the Huayan school patriarch Fazang, the ultimate view of the Buddha's Pure Land (derived from the Avatamsaka sutra) is that it is interfused with all worlds in the multiverse and indeed with all phenomena (dharmas). This view of the Buddha's Pure Land is inconceivable and all pervasive. Since for Fazang, the entire Dharma realm is visible within each particle in the universe, the Pure Land is therefore contained in every phenomena and is non-dual with our world.

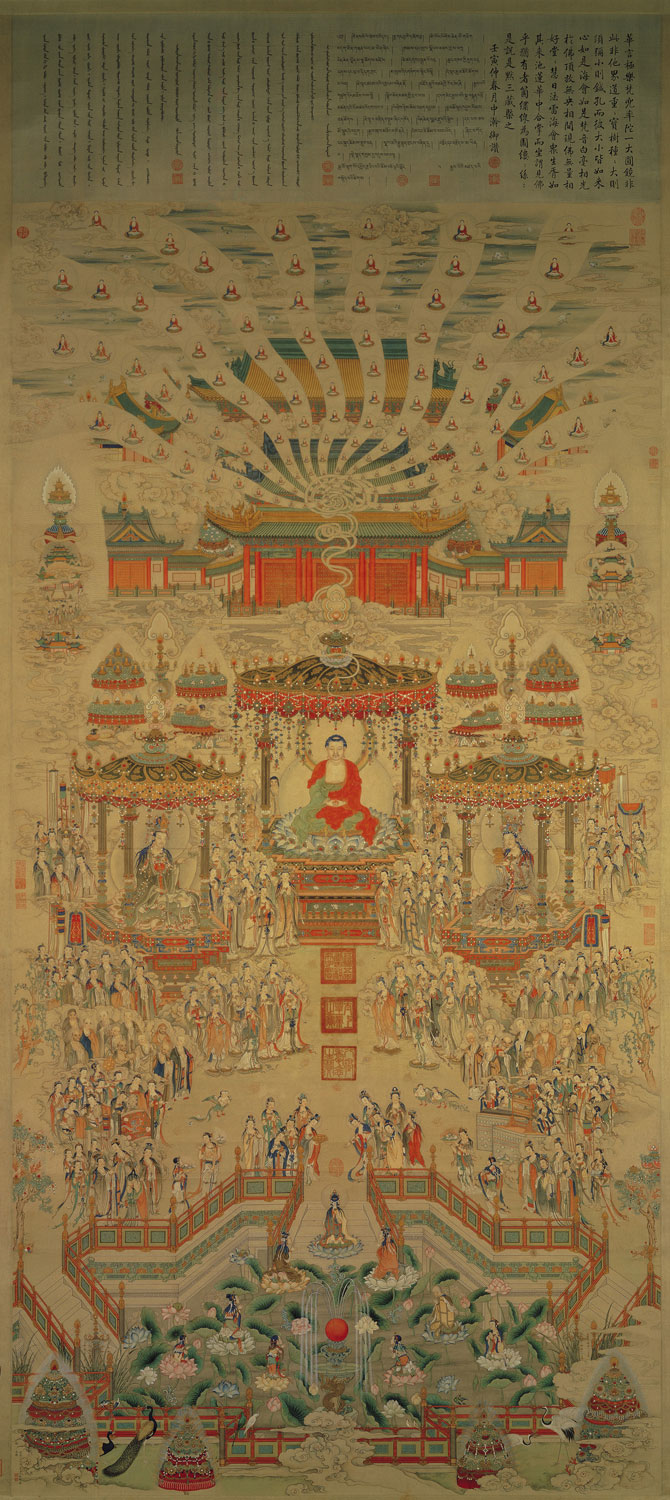
Qing dynasty painting by Ding Guanpeng titled Illustration of the Splendid Pure Land, currently housed in the National Palace Museum, Taipei.

Later Chinese thinkers similarly attempted to synthesize the two ideas. Yúnqī Zhūhóng (1535–1615) saw the Pure Land as an actual place which is a useful upaya (skill means) created by the Buddha. Once beings reach this realm, they realize that it is just the Buddha mind, and that the Buddha's wisdom was not ever separate from their own mind. Real sages can see that both ideas are interconnected and thus can affirm both without any conflict. Similarly, Hānshān Déqīng (c. 1546–1623) taught a synthesis of these various views on the nature of the pure land.

=== Types of pure lands ===
==== Tiantai schema ====
East Asian Buddhist thinkers taught various schemas which outlined different types or levels of the pure lands. One of the most influential of these was that taught in the Tiantai school which outlined four pure lands:

1. The Land of Sages and Commoners (凡聖同居土), a.k.a. Land of Enlightened and Unenlightened Beings. In this realm, all types of beings dwell, including, devas, śrāvakas, and ordinary human persons (manuṣyà).
2. Land of skillful means with remainder (方便有餘土), in this type of land, beings who have rid themselves of unenlightened views and thoughts (見思) are reborn, such as śrāvakas and pratyekabuddhas.
3. The Land of eternal reward and liberation (實報無障礙土), a realm inhabited by bodhisattvas.
4. The Land of Eternally Tranquil Light (常寂光土), this is the Pure Land of the Dharmakāya; true Buddhahood, the realm of the Buddha's eternal nirvana.

==== Japanese Pure Land ====
In Japanese Pure land Buddhism meanwhile, a common distinction is between two main lands that Pure Land devotees can be reborn in: the Transformed Land and the Fulfilled Land. Shinran (1173 – 1263), the founder of Jōdo Shinshū, discusses this theory, drawing on the teachings of Shandao. Shinran's schema is as follows:

- The Transformed Land of compassionate means (Jp: 方便化土, Hōben Kedo) - the Saṃbhogakāya pure land which is described in the sutras as having various features (trees, jeweled ponds, etc) and is the land that is created by the power of Amitabha Buddha's past vows. Those who meditate on the Buddha Amitabha with faith, but have not fully abandoned self-power and have not attained shinjin (absolute trust in Amitabha Buddha without any doubt or calculation) will be reborn here. Here they instantly attain the bodhisattva stage of non-retrogression (Skt: avaivartika, Ch: 不退轉), gain a divine body and other qualities. Shinran also seems to equate the Transformed Land with the related concept of the "Borderland" (Jp: 辺地, Henji), a type of birth in which one does not see the Buddha for some time until one has been purified of afflictions. This is also called realm of sloth and pride, the castle of doubt, or the womb palace.
- The Truly Fulfilled Land (真実報土, Shinjitsu Hōdo) - This is the eternal and uncreated original Dharmakaya, i.e. Nirvana, Buddhahood, the ultimate reality which is inconceivable. According to Shinran, those who have attained shinjin attain this land instantly after death, thus bypassing all the bodhisattva stages.

Shin Buddhism follows Shinran's schema of the Pure Land to explain the differing results attained by nembutsu practitioners after death. Shin distinguishes two main aspects of the Pure Land: (1) the Transformed Land, perceptible to ordinary beings and attained by those who practice with partial reliance on self-power; (2) and the Truly Fulfilled Land, which is inconceivable and identified with Buddhahood itself, and realized only by those who attain shinjin. The Transformed Land is also associated with the concept of the "Borderland", where beings still burdened by doubt are born in lotus pods and remain temporarily separated from seeing Amida. Although Shinran proclaims the Fulfilled Land where one instantly attains Buddhahood as the real goal of the eighteenth vow, all provisional transformed lands are still seen as compassionate manifestations of the Original Vow.

==== Hanshan Deqing ====
According to Hanshan Deqing (1546–1623), who was a leading Chan monk in Ming China, there are three kinds of Pure Lands (associated with the trikaya, the three bodies of the buddha):

- the Eternal Land of Calm Illumination, also known as the Pure Land of mere-mind. This is the land where the Buddhas and bodhisattvas live.
- the Majestic Land of True Reward, which refers to the Huayan view of a Pure Land that pervades the entire universe and is interfused with every particle and phenomenon in existence.
- the Incomplete Land of Expediency, which is the 'Western paradise" of Sukhavati taught in the Amitabha sutras, and is only one of a myriad of such skillfully manifested Pure Lands in existence. This land is associated with the nirmanakaya.

== In Tibetan Buddhism ==
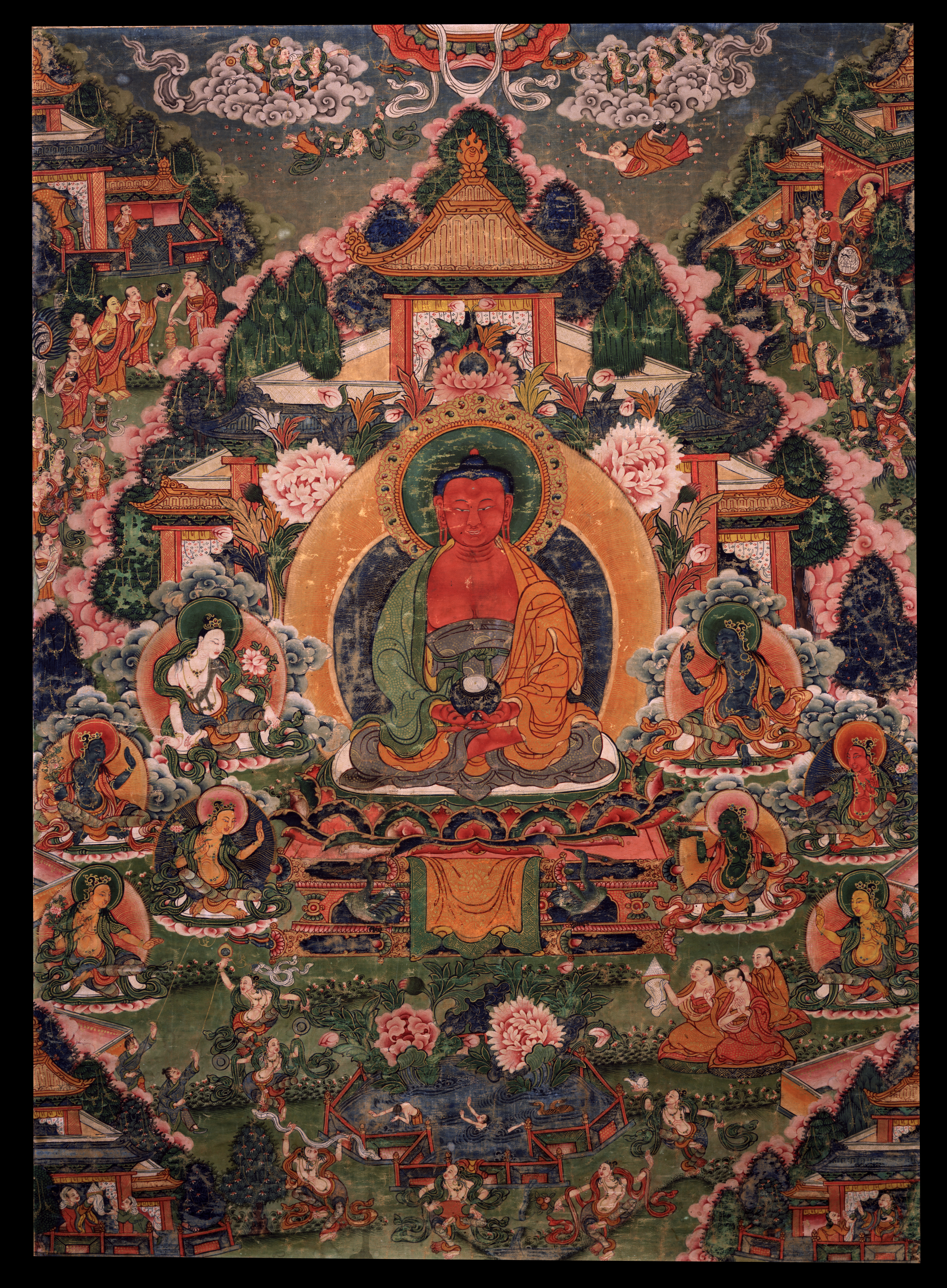
Buddha Amitabha in His Pure Land of Suvakti with the eight great bodhisattvas. Central Tibet, 18th century.

In Tibetan Buddhism, buddhafields (Skt. buddhakṣetra; Wylie: sangs rgyas kyi zhing) or pure realms (Wyl. dag pa'i zhing) are understood as realms arising due to the intention and aspiration of a buddha or bodhisattva. They are also understood to manifest effortlessly and spontaneously from the Buddha qualities.

=== Types of buddhafields ===
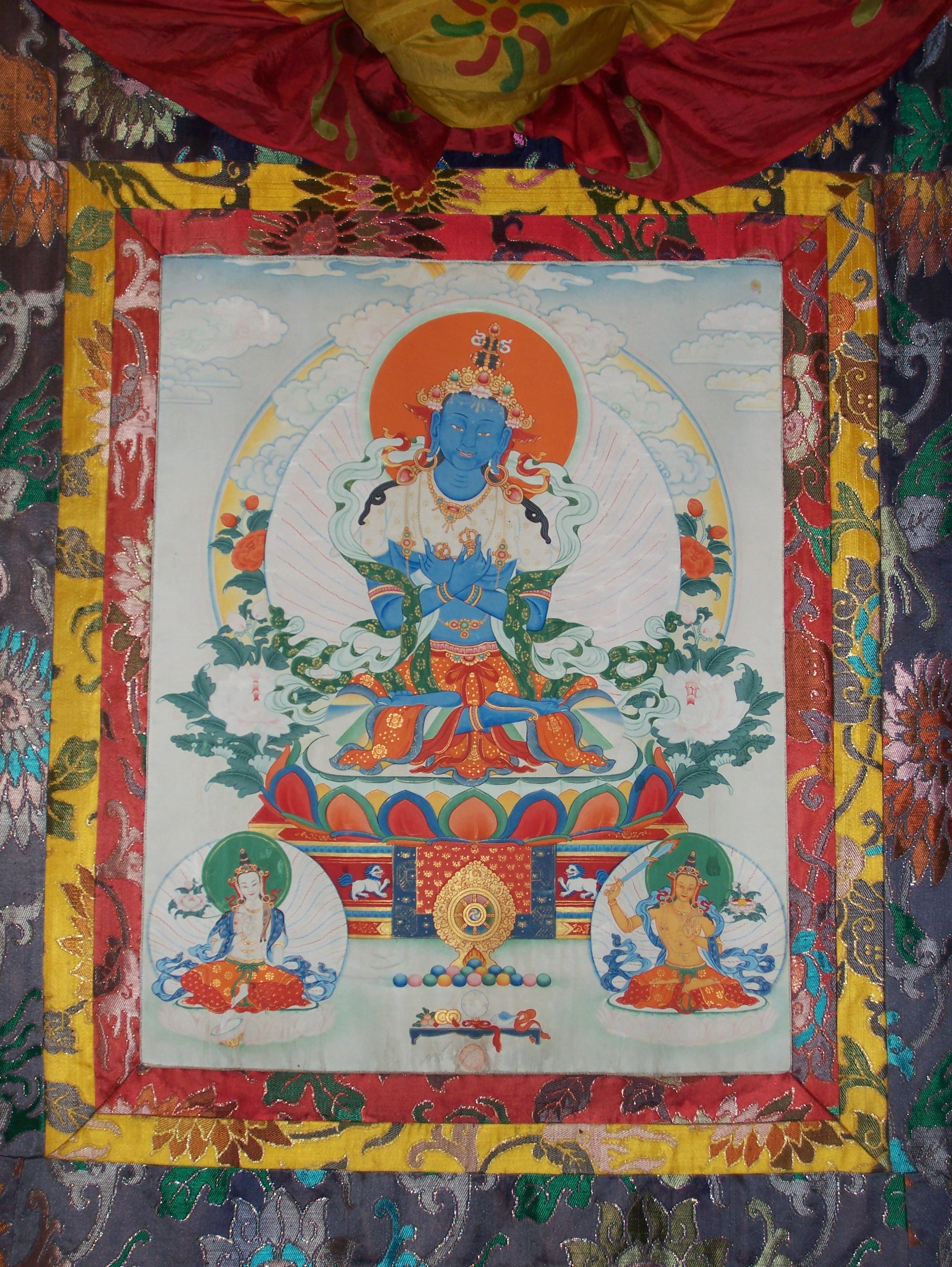
Tibetan thangka of Vajradhara

In Tibetan Buddhism, it is generally held there are two main types of pure lands or buddhafields:

- The Sambhogakāya buddhafield, which is Akaniṣṭha Ghanavyūha (i.e. the Densely Arrayed Akaniṣṭha, Tib. 'Og min rgyan stug po bkod pa; Skt. Ghanavyūhakaniṣṭha), is only accessible to bodhisattvas on the pure stages (eighth to tenth bhumis). This is because traditionally it is held that the sambhogakāya (co-enjoyment body) cannot be perceived by anyone with afflictive obscurations. Akaniṣṭha is where the cosmic Sambhogakāya, Vairocana Jñanasaghara or Vajradhara, resides. It is also the source out of all Nirmāṇakāya Buddhas and Buddhafields such as Sukhāvati emanate from. Furthermore, it is the supreme buddhafield in which all Buddhas attain Buddhahood.
- Nirmāṇakāya buddhafields - which are many, and include Sukhavati, Abhirati, Zangdokpalri (the field of Padmasambhava) and so forth. The nature of these fields vary, some can be attained by all types of beings, others have certain spiritual attainments as requirement.

All buddhafields are understood as ultimately arising from the Dharmakāya, the foundational aspect of the "triple body" of Buddhahood (trikaya). The Dharmakāya is the basis, ground, or "source" (Tibetan: ཆོས་འབྱུང, Wylie: chos 'byung; Sanskrit: dharmodaya), the true nature of reality, out of which all buddhas and buddhafields arise.

=== Pure vision ===
Tibetan Buddhism also holds that this world is also a pure land, since samsara and nirvana are non-dual. Specifically, our world is the pure land of the Sambhoghakaya Vairocana Buddha, as stated in the Avatamsaka sutra and other scriptures. Though our realm is already pure, we cannot see the purity of the world due to our delusion and afflictions (as per the Vimalakirti Sutra). However, on attaining the higher bodhisattva stages, the purified mind will be able to witness the purity of this world, along with the majestic displays of the jeweled ground, divine flowers, and so on. Furthermore, Tibetan Vajrayana deity yoga methods require the yogi to maintain a "pure vision" of this realm as being the pure realm of the deity, along with the visualization of their chosen deity. To fail to do this at all times is a deviation from the tantric practice and the esoteric view taught in the tantras.

As explained by Dilgo Khyentse Rinpoche:

From the Vajrayana perspective, however, the understanding of buddha fields is a deeper one. The root of the Vajrayana is "pure vision", or the perception of the perfect purity of all phenomena. To enact this purity of perception, we do not perceive the place where we are now as just an ordinary place; we imagine it to be a celestial buddha field.

=== Mandala ===
Mandalas, especially sand mandalas, are 'Pure Lands' and may be understood as Nirmāṇakāya, as are all murti, thangka and sacred tools that have been consecrated, dedicated and the 'deity' (yidam) invoked and requested to reside. Some namkha are Pure Lands. According to Nirmāṇakāya (as tulku) theory, nirmanakaya spontaneously arise due to the intention, aspiration, faith and devotion of the sangha.

== In other Chinese religions ==
Chinese Taoism adopted the idea of heaven realms similar to pure lands from Chinese Buddhism. One popular afterlife in Chinese Taoism is the pure land of eternal Sukha (Chánglè Jìngtǔ, 長樂淨土). It has a similar function to pure lands in Buddhism. This pure land is the realm of Tàiyǐ Zhēnrén also known by the longer title Heavenly Venerable Taiyi Savior from Suffering, the Great Emperor of Azure Radiance (青華大帝太乙救苦天尊). Taiyi, like Amitabha, is also said to provide salvation for all sentient beings in the 10 directions, with a different incarnation for each direction.

Chinese Manichean texts also contain depictions of pure lands.

There are various Pure Land worlds described in various texts of various Chinese folk religions and Chinese new religions.

== See also ==
- Samavasarana in Jainism
- Devaloka, Vaikuṇṭha and Svarga in Hinduism
- Heaven
- Nirvana in Buddhism
- Tarwan in Mandaeism
- Field of Merit

== Notes ==
=== Bibliography ===
- Dudjom Jigdral Yeshe Dorje (23 July 2012). The Nyingma School of Tibetan Buddhism: Its Fundamentals and History. Wisdom Publications. ISBN 978-0-86171-734-7.
- Jones, Charles B. (18 May 2021). Pure Land: History, Tradition, and Practice. Shambhala Publications. ISBN 9781611808902. Archived from the original on 27 June 2021.
- Jones, Charles B. (2019) Chinese Pure Land Buddhism, Understanding a Tradition of Practice. University of Hawai‘i Press / Honolulu.
- Nakamura, Hajime (1980). Indian Buddhism: A Survey with Bibliographical Notes. Motilal Banarsidass. ISBN 978-81-208-0272-8.
- Gomez, Louis, O. (2004). "Pure Lands", in Buswell, Robert E., ed. Encyclopedia of Buddhism. Macmillan Reference USA. pp. 703–706. ISBN 0-02-865718-7.
- Galen, Amstutz; Blum, Mark L. (2006). Editors’ Introduction: Pure Lands in Japanese Religion. Japanese Journal of Religious Studies 33 (2), 217-221
- Halkias, Georgios (2013). Luminous Bliss: a Religious History of Pure Land Literature in Tibet. With an Annotated Translation and Critical Analysis of the Orgyen-ling golden short Sukhāvatīvyūha-sūtra. University of Hawai‘i Press, 335 pages.
- Halkias, Georgios; Payne, Richard K. (2019). Pure Lands in Asian Texts and Contexts: An Anthology. University of Hawaii Press.
- Proffitt, Aaron P. Esoteric Pure Land Buddhism. Pure Land Buddhist Studies. Honolulu: University of Hawai‘i Press, April 2023. Hardcover edition, ISBN 978-0-8248-9361-3; Paperback edition, January 2024, ISBN 978-0-8248-9371-2. UH PressAbeBooks+1UBC Press
