= Adi-Buddha =

First or Primordial Buddha

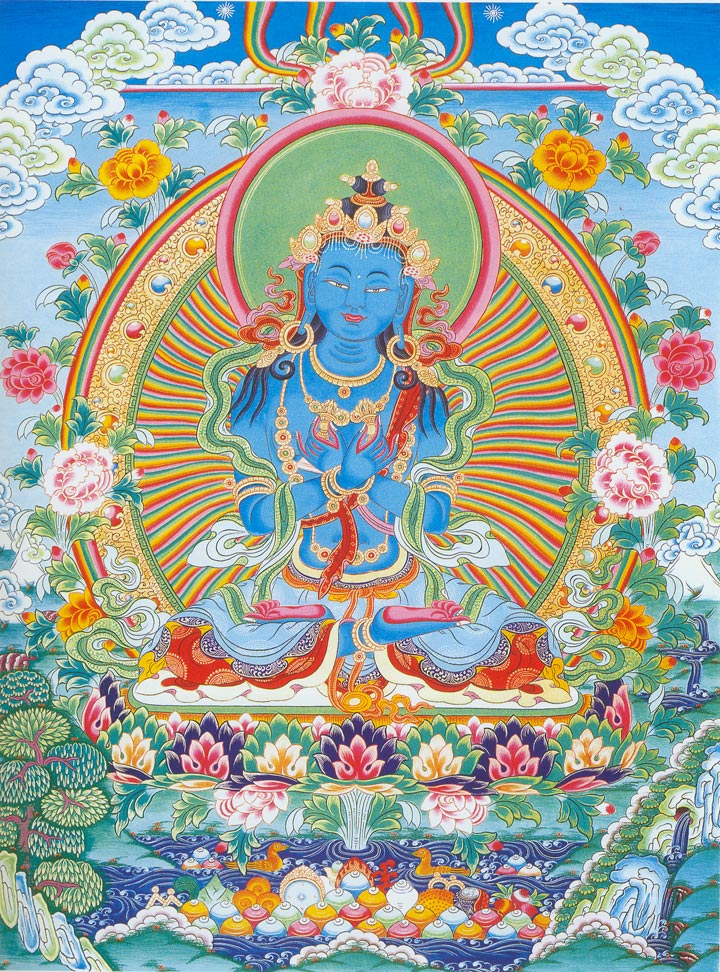
Vajradhara, the main Ādibuddha, depicted in the Sarma (New Translation) schools of Tibetan Buddhism

The Ādi-Buddha (Tibetan: དང་པོའི་སངས་རྒྱས།, Wylie: dang po'i sangs rgyas, THL: Dangpö Sanggyé, Ch: 本佛, Jp: honbutsu, First Buddha, Original Buddha, or Primordial Buddha) is a Mahayana Buddhist concept referring to the most fundamental, supreme, or ancient Buddha in the cosmos. Another common term for this figure is Dharmakāya Buddha.

The term emerges in tantric Buddhist literature, most prominently in the Kalachakra. "Ādi" means "first", such that the Ādibuddha was the first to attain Buddhahood. "Ādi" can also mean "primordial", not referring to a person but to an innate wisdom that is present in all sentient beings.

In East Asian Buddhism, the term 本佛 (běn fó, original Buddha, root Buddha) also appears in the works of Tiantai and Tendai school, referring to the original Buddha of the Lotus Sutra which was also later identified with the cosmic Buddha Mahāvairocana. It and similar terms were also used in the traditions of Zhenyan and Shingon Buddhism to refer to the cosmic Buddha Mahāvairocana.

== Indian sources ==
According to D.T. Suzuki, the Laṅkāvatāra Sūtra uses various terms for the dharmakāya, including Dharma-buddha, Dharmatā-buddha, Mūlatathāgata, and the Tathatājñāna-buddha. This is one of the earliest pre-tantric discussions of a "root Buddha" (Mūlatathāgata) or Dharmakāya Buddha, a Buddha which corresponds to the Dharmakāya, the ultimate Buddha body.

Various Indian Buddhist tantric works refer to an Ādibuddha, such as the Kalachakra Tantra, where it refers to the ultimate Buddha-nature and Buddha-wisdom or awakened gnosis (buddha-jñana). In the Guhyasamāja Tantra, the Buddha Vajradhāra (the "Vajra holder") is referred to as:

the Teacher, who is bowed to by all the Buddhas, best of the three vajras, best of the great best, supreme lord of the three vajras.

Vesna Wallace describes the concept of Ādibuddha in the Kalachakra tradition as follows:

when the Kalacakra tradition speaks of the Ādibuddha in the sense of a beginningless and endless Buddha, it is referring to the innate gnosis that pervades the minds of all sentient beings and stands as the basis of both samsara and nirvana. Whereas, when it speaks of the Ādibuddha as the one who first attained perfect enlightenment by means of imperishable bliss, and when it asserts the necessity of acquiring merit and knowledge in order to attain perfect Buddhahood, it is referring to the actual realization of one's own innate gnosis. Thus, one could say that in the Kalacakra tradition, Ādibuddha refers to the ultimate nature of one's own mind and to the one who has realized the innate nature of one's own mind by means of purificatory practices.

There was also a tradition in India which saw Mañjuśrī as the Ādibuddha, as exemplified by Vilāsavajra's commentary to the Mañjuśrīnāmasamgīti. Vilāsavajra states in his commentary:

The gnosis-being Mañjuśrī is not the bodhisattva who is the master of the ten stages (bhumi). Rather, he is the non-dual gnosis (advayajñāna), the perfection of wisdom (prajñāpāramitā) itself.

According to Anthony Tribe, this tradition may have influenced the Jñānapāda tradition of Guhyasamāja exegesis, which places Mañjuvajra (a tantric form of Mañjuśrī) at the center of the Guhyasamāja mandala.

== Tibetan Buddhism ==
In Indo-Tibetan Buddhism, the Ādibuddha is most often expressed as one of three forms: the primordial Buddha Samantabhadra in the Nyingma and Bön traditions (not to be confused with the bodhisattva Samantabhadra), the ultimate Buddha Vajradhara in the Kagyu, Gelug and Sakya traditions, or the supreme manifestation of Buddhahood Kalachakra in the Jonang tradition.

While each tradition has its own principal form of the Adibuddha (Samantabhadra, Vajradhara or Kalachakra), the Rime movement (impartiality, universality) has resulted in each tradition acknowledging and even practicing the tantras originating within other traditions.

=== In the Nyingma (Ancient) school ===
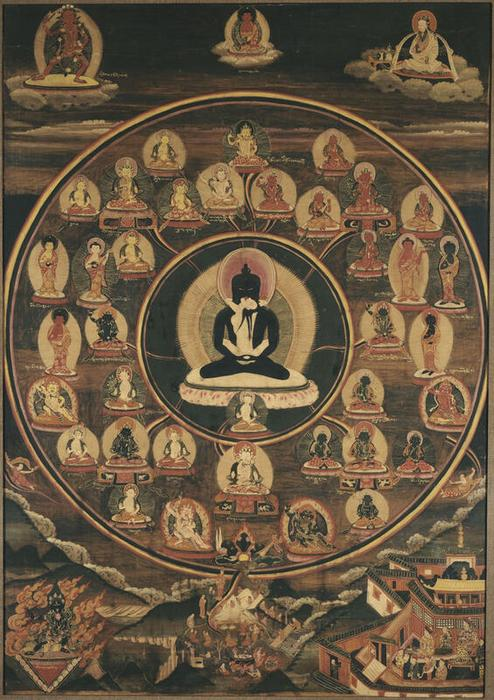
A painting depicting Samantabhadra in union with his consort Samantabhadri.

In the Nyingma school, the Adi-Buddha is called Samantabhadra (Skt.; Tib. ཀུན་ཏུ་བཟང་པོ་, Kuntu Zangpo; Wyl. kun tu bzang po), not to be confused with the bodhisattva Samantabhadra. Nyingma art often depicts this figure as a naked blue Buddha. According to Dzogchen Ponlop:

The color blue symbolizes the expansive, unchanging quality of space, which is the ground of all arisings, the basis of all appearances, and the source of all phenomena. The absence of robes symbolizes the genuine reality beyond any dualistic, conceptual, or philosophical clothing. That is the dharmakaya buddha: the genuine body of absolute truth.

In Nyingma, Samantabhadra is also considered to be the source of all Dzogchen teachings.

The Kunjed Gyalpo Tantra calls Samantabhadra the "All-Creating King" (Tib. Kunjed Gyalpo), because all phenomena are said to be manifestations or displays of Samantabhadra. According to Namkhai Norbu, this does not mean there is some being called Samantabhadra that creates the universe, instead what it refers to is that all things arise from "the state of consciousness Samantabhadra, the state of Dharmakaya." In this sense, Samantabhadra is seen as being a symbolic personification of the ground or basis (ghzi) in Dzogchen thought.

Namkhai Norbu explains that the Dzogchen idea of the Adi-Buddha Samantabhadra "should be mainly understood as a metaphor to enable us to discover our real condition." He further adds that:

If we deem Samantabhadra an individual being, we are far from the true meaning. In reality, he denotes our potentiality that, even though at the present moment we are in samsara, has never been conditioned by dualism. From the beginning, the state of the individual has been pure and always remains pure: this is what Samantabhadra represents. But when we fall into conditioning, it is as if we are no longer Samantabhadra because we are ignorant of our true nature. So what is called the primordial Buddha, or Adibuddha, is only a metaphor for our true condition.

Karl Brunnhölzl states:

Longchenpa's Treasure Trove of Scriptures...explains that Samantabhadra—one of the most common Dzogchen names for the state of original buddhahood—is nothing other than the primordial, innate awareness that is naturally free, even before any notions of "buddhas" or "sentient beings" have emerged.

In Dzogchen thought, there are said to be five aspects of Samantabhadra. Longchenpa explains these as follows:

- Samantabhadra as teacher: "Means that all buddhas while residing in the forms of the sambhogakaya and the dharmakaya in Akaniṣṭha, promote the welfare of all sentient beings through sending forth countless emanations to all the distinct realms of those to be guided."
- Samantabhadra as ground: "Is the dharmata of all phenomena — suchness. This is also called "Samantabhadra as nature".
- Samantabhadra as adornment: "The appearance of all phenomena, which are self-arising as the play of the bearers of the nature of phenomena. This consists of all that is completely pure, in that its nature is illusory."
- Samantabhadra as awareness: "self arising wisdom, the sugata heart," i.e. the Buddha-nature described in the Uttaratantra.
- Samantabhadra as realization: "The fundamental basic nature. Through realizing it well, the eyes of freedom are found. This is also called "Samantabhadra as the path."

=== In the Sarma (New Translation) traditions ===
The Sarma schools of Tibetan Buddhism generally practice Indian tantras like the Kalacakra Tantra and the Guhyasamāja Tantra and their commentaries. In these Indian works, the Ādibuddha takes various forms, including Vajradhara, Kalacakra, Manjuvajra, Aksobhya, and Hevajra. The most universal depiction of the Ādibuddha in the Sarma schools is as Vajradhara, but different tantras depict the Ādibuddha differently (emphasizing different aspects of Buddhahood) resulting in many names for this underlying, primordial Buddha.

Alex Wayman notes that the Pradīpoddyotana, a tantric commentary, explains that the "three vajras" are the three mysteries of Body, Speech, and Mind, which are the displays of the Ādibuddha. Wayman further writes:

Tsong-kha-pa's Mchan-'grel explains the "lord of body": displays simultaneously innumerable materializations of body; "lord of speech": teaches the Dharma simultaneously to boundless sentient beings each in his own language; "lord of mind": understands all the knowable which seems impossible.

According to the 14th Dalai Lama, the Ādibuddha is also seen in Mahayana Buddhism as the "ultimate reality", the "ultimate source", and the "clear light". He states that, "If a sutra describes the Primordial Buddha as an autonomous entity, we must be able to interpret the assertion without taking it literally."

== In East Asian Buddhism ==
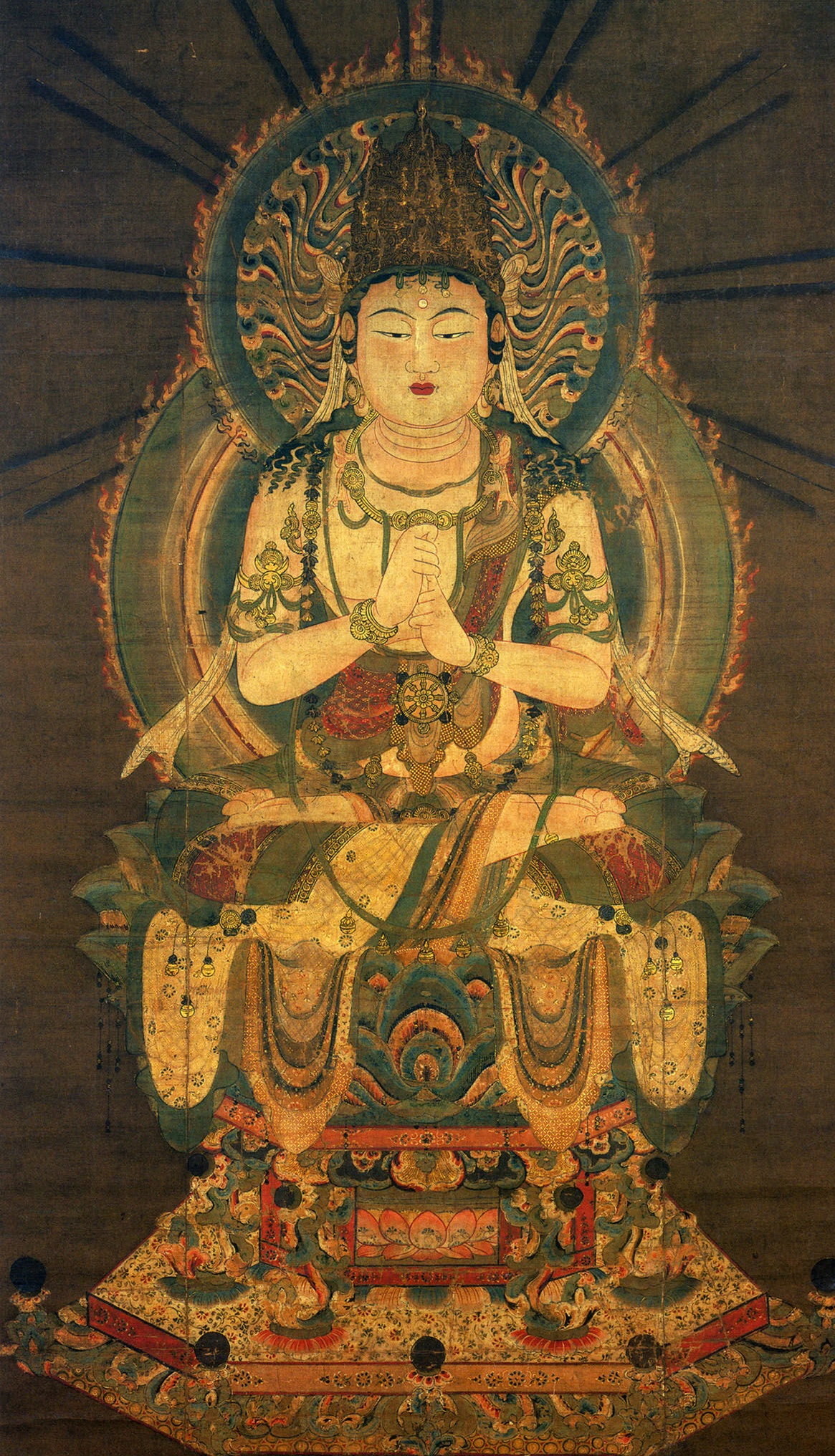
12th century painting of Mahāvairocana, Heian period, collecting in Nezu Museum

The term 本佛 (běn fó, original Buddha, root Buddha) appears in the works of Tiantai and Tendai school, referring to the original Buddha of the Lotus Sutra's Original Gate (本門) teaching, which was also later identified with the cosmic Buddha Mahāvairocana. In Tendai and most sects of Nichiren Buddhism, it is considered that the Lotus Sutra's Essential Teaching section (chapters 15-28) reveals the "Original Buddha", the ultimate Buddha who has always been enlightened and will never pass away (though he may appear to do so as a skillful means). The term also referred to buddha-nature, the originally enlightened nature in all beings.

In Chinese Esoteric Buddhism, and in Japanese Shingon, the Ādibuddha is typically considered to be Mahāvairocana. In Japanese Shingon Buddhism, the terms Primordial body (honji-shin) and Dharmakaya principle (riho-jin) are used to refer to the Ādibuddha. It is also associated with the letter A, the first letter of the Siddham Alphabet, and is seen as the source of the universe. Śubhakarasiṃha's Darijing shu (J. Dainichikyōsho; 大日經疏) states that Mahāvairocana (teacher of the Mahāvairocanābhisaṃbodhi-sūtra), is “the original ground dharmakāya.” (薄伽梵即毘盧遮那本地法身, at Taisho no. 1796:39.580). This is the position followed by Kūkai, the founder of Shingon, who says in his Dainichikyō kaidai that “Mahāvairocana is the self-nature Dharmakāya, which is the intrinsic truth-body of original awakening,” (大毗盧遮那者自性法身卽本有本覺理身).

Meanwhile, in the Japanese Jōdo Shinshū school, Amitabha Buddha ("Amida") is seen as being the "Supreme Buddha" or the One Original buddha (ichi-butsu).

Certain authors of the Shingon and Tendai school also saw Amida Buddha as the original Buddha. The Shingon monk Dōhan (1179-1252) was one of the first figures to explicitly identify Amida Buddha with Mahāvairocana Buddha in his Himitsu nenbutsu shō. In a similar fashion, Kōshū (1276-1350), a master of the Eshin lineage, also discussed the view that Amida can be identified with the original Buddha of the esoteric tradition in his Keiran shūyōshū.

The Nikko-lineage of Nichiren Shoshu regard Nichiren himself as the Ādibuddha and dispute the contentions of other sects that view him as a bodhisattva.

== In Vaishnavism ==
In the Medieval Orissan School of Vaishnavism, Jagannath was believed to be the first Buddha avatar of Vishnu, or Adi-Buddha; with Gautama Buddha and Chaitanya Mahaprabhu being further incarnations of the Buddha-Jagannath.

Gurus of Gaudiya Vaishnavaism argue that epithets for the Buddha like Sugata Buddha and Adi Buddha refer to the 9th avatar among the Dashavataras of Vishnu, who was a different person from Gautama Buddha, based on Amarakosha and other Buddhist texts.

== See also ==
- Divine presence
- Sanghyang Adi Buddha
