= Akaniṣṭha =

Highest of the Pure Abodes in Buddhist Cosmology

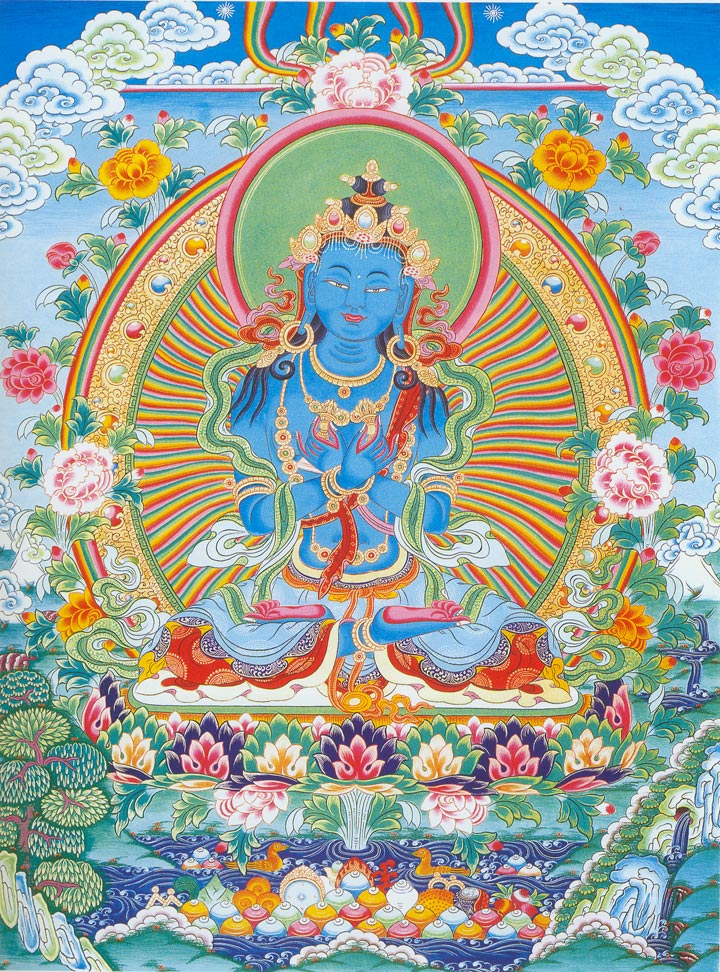
Vajradhara, the Sambhogakaya Buddha.

In classical Buddhist cosmology, Akaniṣṭha (Pali: Akaniṭṭha, meaning "Nothing Higher", "Unsurpassed") is the highest of the Pure Abodes, and thus the highest of all the form realms. It is the realm where devas like Maheśvara live.

In Theravada Buddhism, Akanittha or Akaniṣṭha is one of the 31 planes of existence, and is the highest of the Brahma realms

In Mahayana Buddhism, Akaniṣṭha is also a name for the Pure Land (Buddhafield) of the Buddha Vairocana. This is also the setting of the Ghanavyūha Sūtra. Tibetan Buddhism, Akaniṣṭha (Tib. 'og min) often describes three Akaniṣṭhas:

1. The Ultimate Akaniṣṭha, the formless state of dharmakaya, the dharmadhatu, i.e. the ultimate reality.
2. The Densely Arrayed Akaniṣṭha (Tib. 'Og min rgyan stug po bkod pa; Skt. Ghanavyūhakaniṣṭha), or the "Symbolic Akaniṣṭha" which is the realm of sambhogakaya. "Ghanavyūha Akaniṣṭha", refers to the pure Saṃbhogakāya Buddha field out of which emanate all Nirmāṇakāya Buddhas and Buddhafields such as Sukhāvati. It is the supreme Buddhafield in which all Buddhas attain Buddhahood. The Saṃbhogakāya Buddha Vajradhara is said to have taught the Vajrayana in the realm of Akaniṣṭha Ghanavyūha.
3. The Mundane Akaniṣṭha, which is the highest pure level of the form realm, which is the sphere of nirmanakayas.
