= Abhirati =

Pure land associated with Akshobhya in Mahayana Buddhism

Translations of Abhirati
- English: manifest joy
- Sanskrit: अभिरति
- Chinese: 妙喜; 阿比羅提 (Pinyin: miàoxǐ; ābǐluótí)
- Japanese: 妙喜; 歓喜国; 阿比羅提 (Rōmaji: myōki; kangikoku; abiradai)
- Korean: 묘희 (RR: myoheui)
- Tibetan: མངོན་པར་དགའ་བ་ (mngon par dga' ba)
- Vietnamese: Diệu hỷ

Abhirati (lit. "The Joyous") is the eastern pure land associated with Akshobhya in Mahāyāna Buddhism. It is described in the Akṣobhyatathāgatasyavyūha Sūtra (Taishō Tripiṭaka, 313), which was first translated into Chinese by Lokakṣema by 186 CE, although the attribution to his translation activities remains uncertain.

Although Abhirati emerged in the earliest era of Mahāyāna thought, Abhirati is far less widely known than Sukhāvatī, the pure land of Amitābha that has been the sole focus of Pure Land Buddhism since the Tang dynasty.
