= Vajradhara =

Buddha

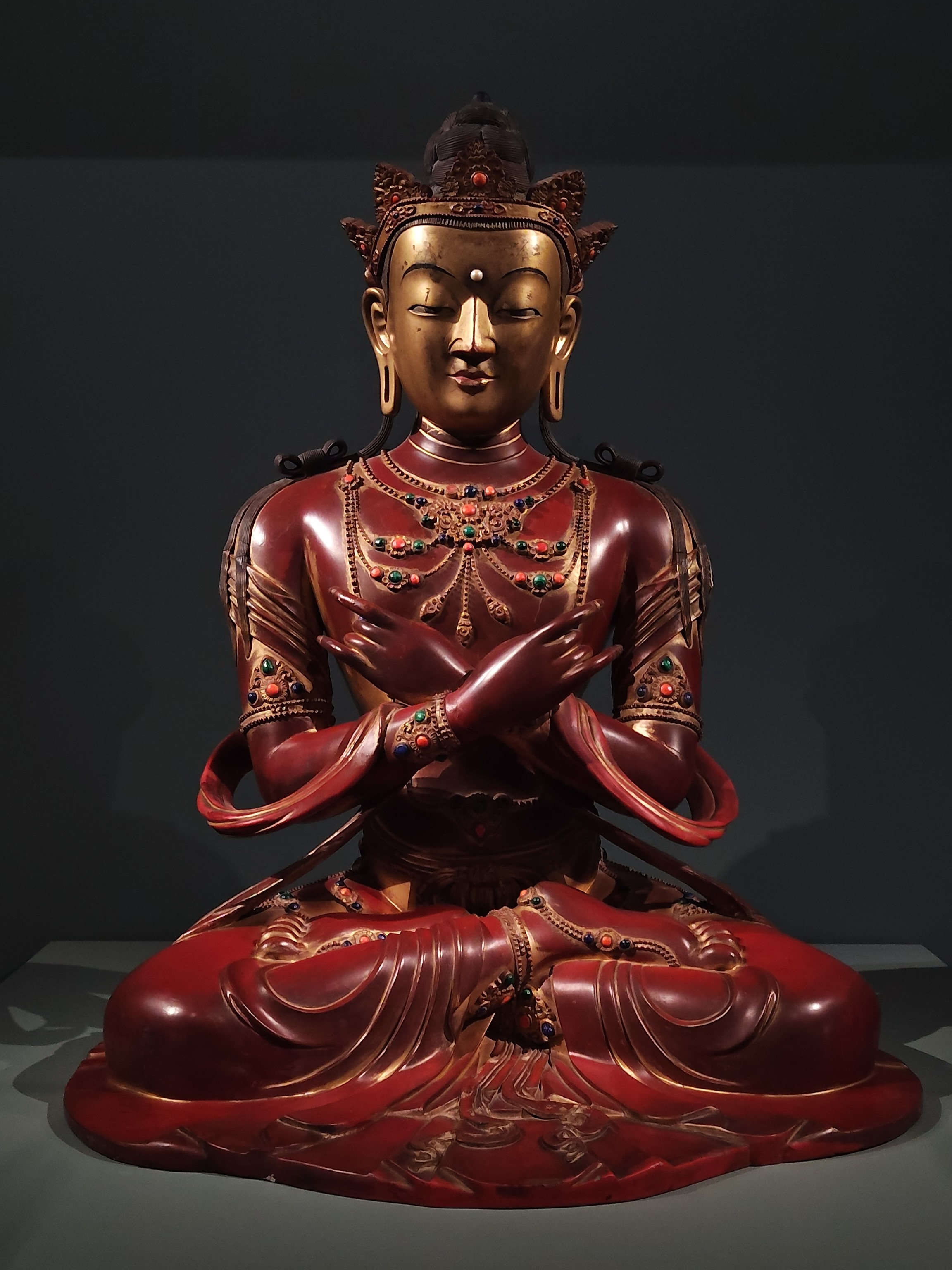
18th-century Chinese statue of Vajradhara made with wood and lacquer

Vajradhara (Sanskrit: वज्रधर, lit. 'Diamond-holder'; Tibetan: རྡོ་རྗེ་འཆང, Wylie: rdo rje 'chang, THL: Dorje Chang; Chinese: 金剛總持; pinyin: Jīngāng Zǒngchí; Javanese: Kabajradharan; Japanese: 持金剛仏; Mongolian: Очирдар, romanized: Ochirdar; Vietnamese: Kim Cang Tổng Trì) is the ultimate primordial Buddha, or Adi-Buddha, according to the Sakya, Gelug and Kagyu schools of Tibetan Buddhism. It is also a name of Indra, because "Vajra" means diamond, as well as the thunderbolt, or anything hard more generally.

In the evolution of Indian Buddhism, Buddha Vajradhara gradually displaced Samantabhadra, who is the 'Primordial Buddha' in the Nyingma, or 'Ancient School.' However, the two are metaphysically equivalent. Achieving the 'state of Vajradhara' is synonymous with complete realisation.

According to the Kagyu lineage, Buddhā Vajradhara is the primordial Buddha, the Dharmakaya Buddha. He is depicted as dark blue in color, expressing the quintessence of buddhahood itself and representing the essence of the historical Buddha's realization of enlightenment.

As such, Buddha Vajradhara is thought to be the supreme essence of all (male) Buddhas; It is the Tantric form of Sakyamuni which is called Vajradhara. Tantras are texts specific to Tantrism and are believed to have been originally taught by the Tantric form of Sakyamuni called Buddha Vajradhara. He is an expression of Buddhahood itself in both single and yabyum form. Buddha Vajradhara is considered to be the prime Buddha of the Father tantras (tib. pha-rgyud) such as Guhyasamaja, Yamantaka, and so on.

From the primordial Buddha Vajradhara/Samantabhadra Buddha/Dorje Chang were manifested the Five Wisdom Buddhas (Dhyani Buddhas):

- Akshobhya
- Amoghasiddhi
- Amitabha
- Ratnasambhava
- Vairocana

Buddha Vajradhara and the Wisdom Buddhas are often subjects of mandala.

Buddha Vajradhara and Samantabhadra Buddha are cognate deities in Tibetan Buddhist cosmology with different names, attributes, appearances and iconography. Both are Dharmakaya Buddhas, that is primordial Buddhas: Samantabhadra is unadorned, that is depicted without any attributes; conversely, Buddha Vajradhara is often adorned and bears attributes, which is generally the iconographic representation of a Sambhogakaya Buddha. Both Buddha Vajradhara and Samantabhadra are generally depicted in yab-yum unity with their respective consorts and are primordial Buddhas, embodying void and ultimate emptiness.

== Dharmakaya as part of the Trikaya ==
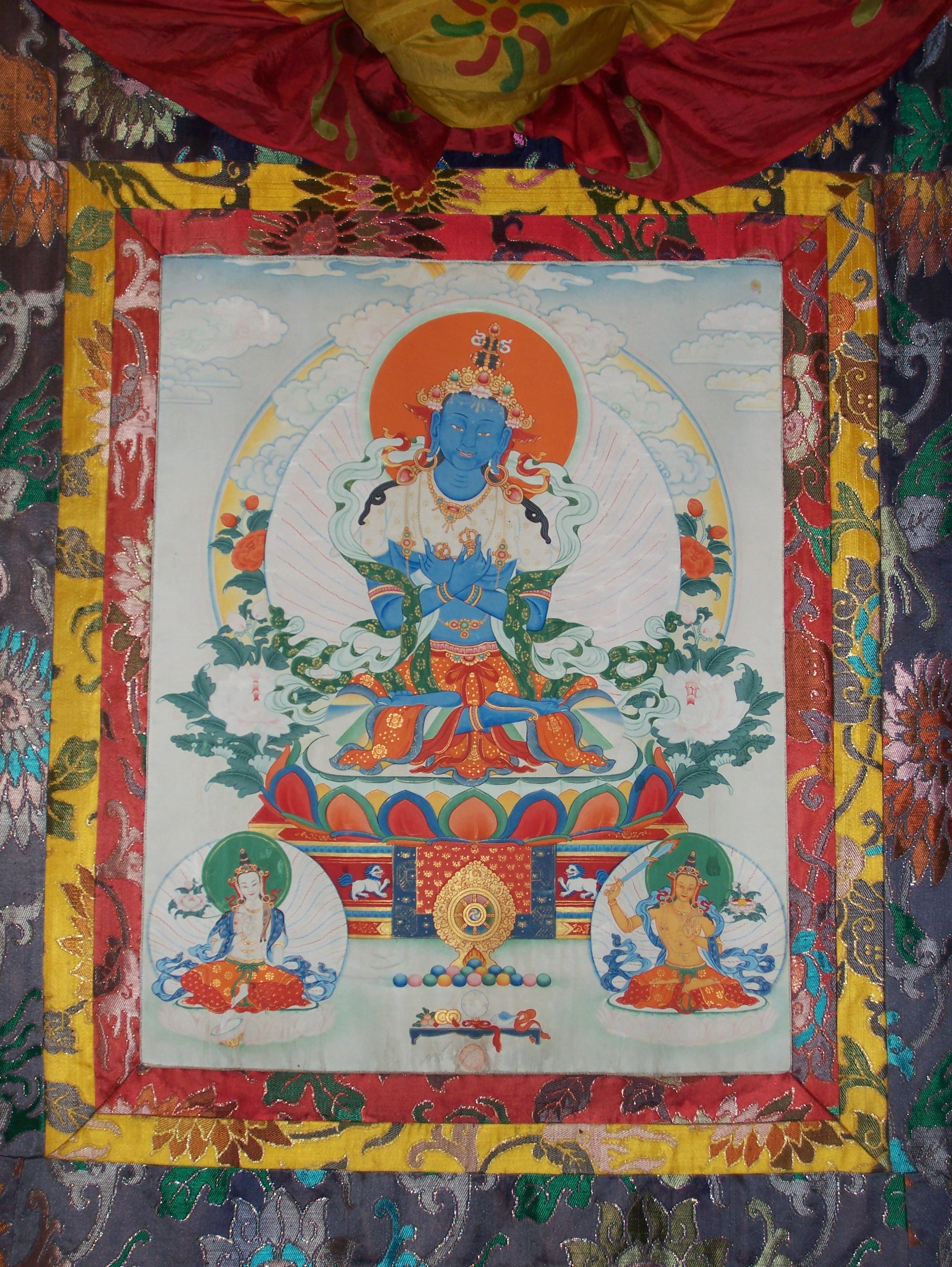
Tibetan thangka of Vajradhara

The Trikaya doctrine (lit. 'Three bodies or personalities'; Chinese: 三身, romanized: Sānshēn; sanjin, in Japanese) is an important Buddhist teaching both on the nature of reality, and what a Buddha is. By the 4th century CE, the Trikaya doctrine had assumed the form that we now know.

Briefly, the doctrine says that a Buddha has three kayas ('bodies'): the nirmanakaya ('created body'), which manifests in time and space; the sambhogakaya ('body of mutual enjoyment'), which is an archetypal manifestation; and the Dharmakaya ('reality body'), which embodies the very principle of enlightenment and knows no limits or boundaries.

In the view of Anuyoga, the "mindstream" (citta santana) is the "continuity" (santana; Wylie: rgyud) that links the Trikaya. The Trikaya, as a triune, is symbolised by the Gankyil.

== Literature ==
'Shining Relics of Enlightened Body' (Tibetan: སྐུ་གདུང་འབར་བ, Wylie: sku gdung 'bar ba) is numbered amongst the 'Seventeen Tantras of Menngagde' (Tibetan: མན་ངག་སྡེའི་རྒྱུད་བཅུ་བདུན, Wylie: man ngag sde'i rgyud bcu bdun) within Dzogchen discourse and is part of the textual support for the Vima Nyingtik. In the Dzogchen tantric text rendered in English as "Shining Relics" (Tibetan: སྐུ་གདུང་འབར་བ, Wylie: sku gdung 'bar ba), an enlightened personality entitled Buddha Vajradhara and a Dakini whose name may be rendered into English as "Clear mind" engage in discourse and dialogue, which is a common convention in such esoteric Buddhist literature and tantric literature in general.

== See also ==
- Mahavairocana
- Namarupa
- Svabhava
- Trikaya
- Vajrayogini
- Vajra

== Link ==
- The Essential Songs of Milarepa / VI. Songs About Vajra Love 46. Answer to Dakini Tzerima
- body, speech, mind A Dictionary of Buddhism
- rdo rje chos (vajradharma) ( b. ) The Tibetan Buddhist Resource Center

Nonsectarian movement

- Ringu Tulku: The Rimé (Ris-med) movement of Jamgon Kongtrul the Great

Sutra

- The Vajracchedika Prajnaparamita Sutra
