= Ghanavyūha Sūtra =

Mahāyāna Sūtra

The Ghanavyūha sūtra (Sanskrit, Dense Array Sūtra, Tibetan: 'phags pa rgyan stug po bkod pa zhes bya ba theg pa chen po'i mdo), also called the Mahāyāna Secret Adornment Sūtra (Chinese: 大乘密嚴經, Dà chéng mì yán jīng) is a Mahāyāna Sūtra which is an important scriptural source for Indian Yogācāra and tathāgatagarbha thought.

The Sanskrit source text is no longer extant. The sutra survives in two Chinese translations, one (Taishō no. 681) by the Indian translator Divākara (613-687) assisted by Fazang, and one by Vajrācārya Amoghavajra (Taishō no. 682). A Tibetan translation also survives as part of the Kanjur (Derge Kanjur no. 110) and it is titled 'phags pa rgyan stug po bkod pa zhes bya ba theg pa chen po'i mdo (Skt. Ārya ghanavyūha nāma mahāyāna sūtra).

== Content ==
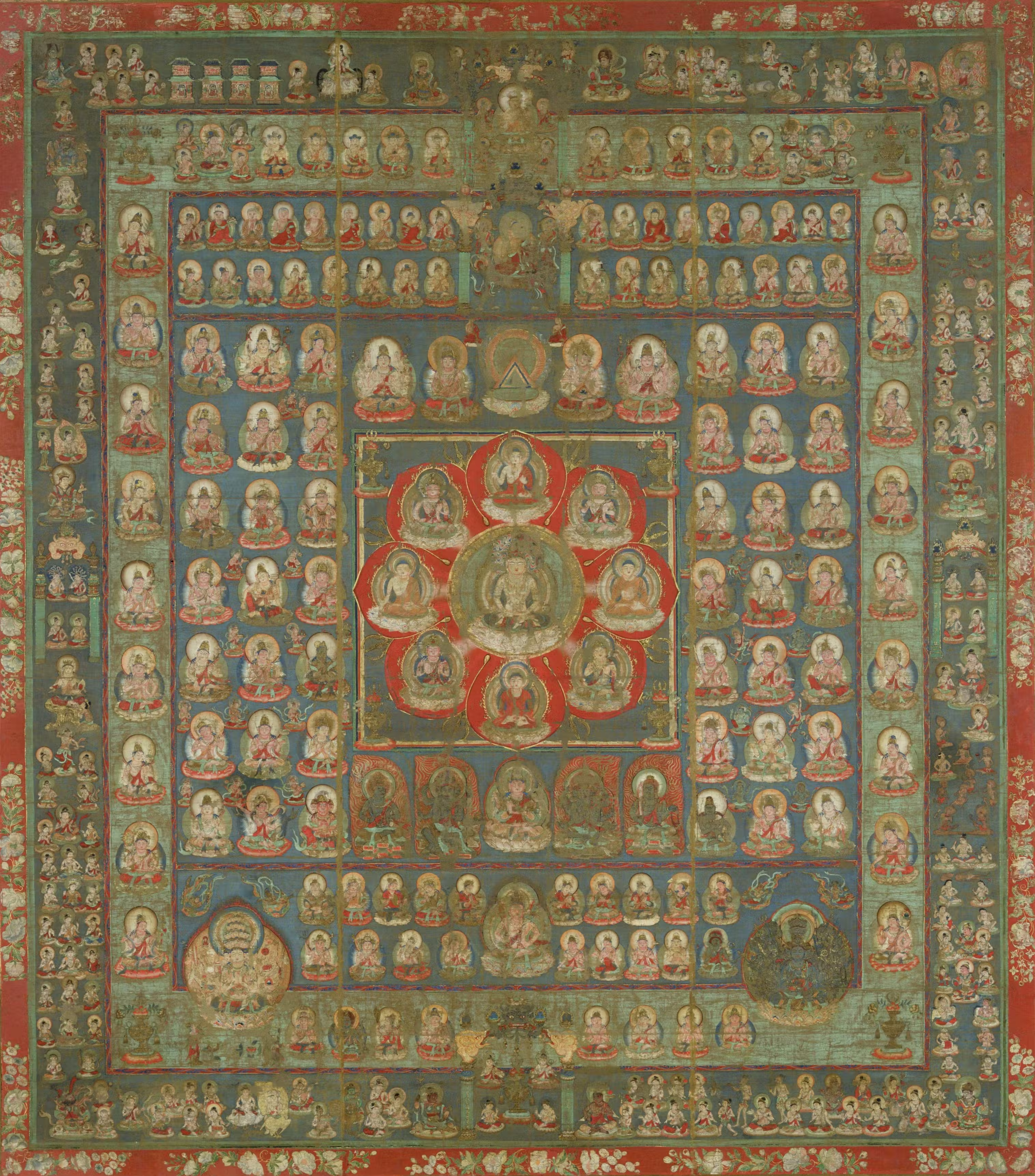
The Garbhadhatu Mandala depicts the buddhafield of Vairocana in Chinese Esoteric Buddhism and Shingon Buddhism.

The sutra recounts a discourse between Śākyamuni Buddha and a bodhisattva named Vajra-garbha (whose name is a synonym for the Tathāgatagarbha) which takes place in the supreme buddhafield called Ghanavyūha (Dense Array or Secret Adornment). The themes of this discourse are similar to the themes found in the Laṅkāvatāra sūtra, and include: the Yogācāra three natures doctrine, the tathāgatagarbha (also called nirvāṇadhātu or dharmadhātu in this sutra), the ālayavijñāna (storehouse consciousness), and the eternal nature of the Buddha. Just like the Laṅkāvatāra sūtra, the Ghanavyūha sutra presents teachings on the emptiness of all phenomena and also on how all phenomena arise from mind.

According to the Ghanavyūha, the Tathāgata (i.e. the Buddha, equated with nirvāṇadhātu and dharmadhātu) is unchanging, unable to be destroyed or extinguished, and is comparable to space (ākāśa). The Ghanavyūha states that the Buddha is all pervasive and compares the Buddha's omnipresence to the moon's reflection which pervades all bodies of water. The Ghanavyūha also rejects the view that nirvāṇa is a kind of annihilation or destruction (like a lamp which goes out), since buddha-nature is that which is unborn and undying.

The Ghanavyūha says that Buddha's presence is always guiding sentient beings according to their needs through numerous skillful means (upaya). The skillful means of the Buddhas include numerous magical transformations (nirmanas). He may appear as a normal being in the world, as a deva, as Vajrapani, or as Mahesvara. The Buddha is compared to a gem which reflects many kinds of images and he is also compared to a sea captain who drives a ship. The numerous transformations of the Buddha include all worlds, which are said to be contained in the Buddha's body. According to the Ghanavyūha, the Buddhas also teach numerous scriptures as skillful means, including non-Buddhist scriptures like the Arthaśāstra and the three Vedas.

Like the Laṅkāvatāra sūtra, the Ghanavyūha associates the doctrines of the storehouse consciousness and the tathāgatagarbha. It states that the storehouse consciousness has two aspects, a pure consciousness and a defiled consciousness. The pure part of the storehouse consciousness, the naturally luminous mind, is said to be a synonym for the tathāgatagarbha which is "luminous and always pure", while the defiled consciousness is what hides or conceals the pure aspect.

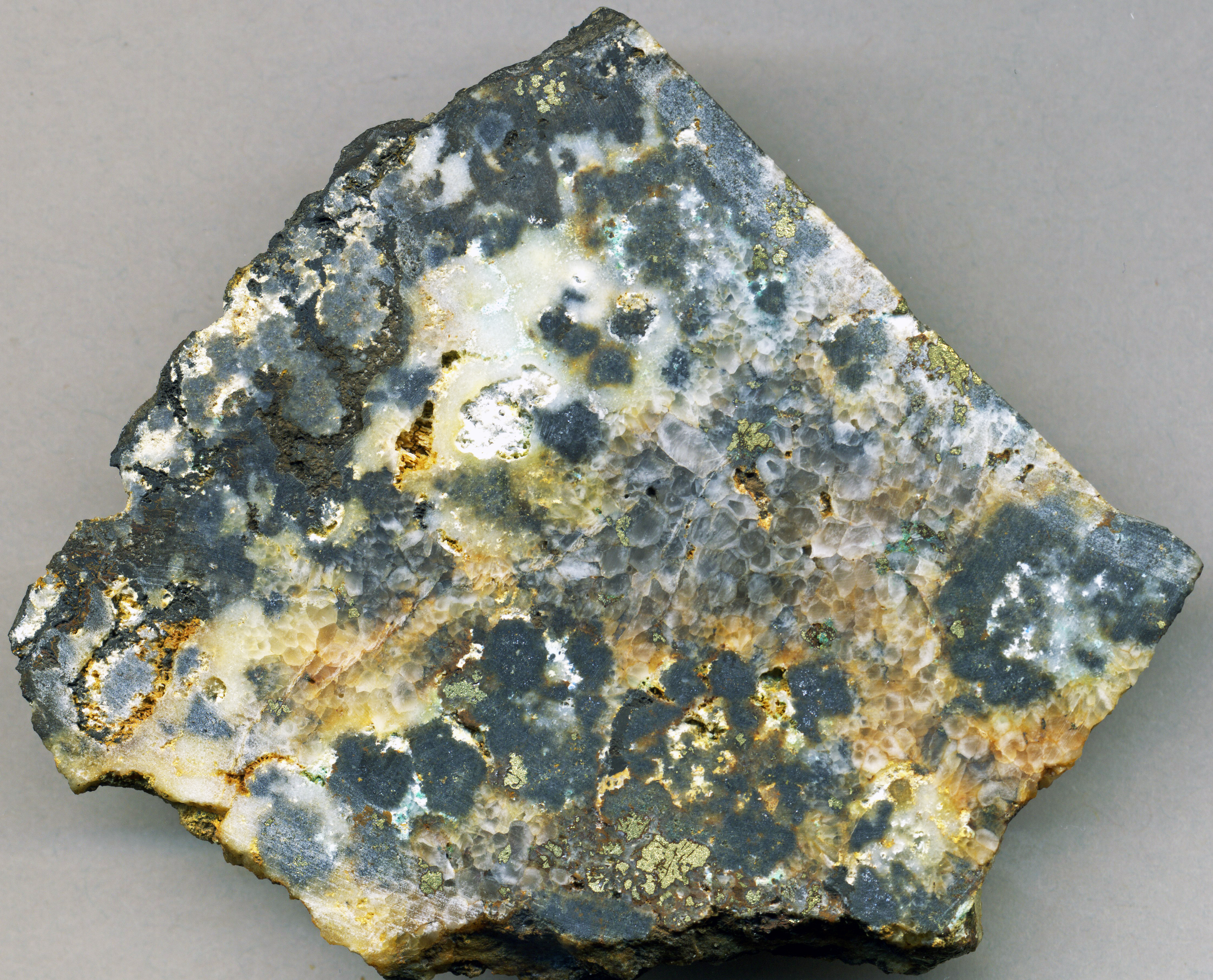
The relationship between buddha-nature and the storehouse consciousness is compared to that of rock and gold in gold ore.

The Ghanavyūha uses the simile of the gold covered by rocks to explain this relationship:

O king, the mind is inconceivable, always being naturally luminous. It is the tathāgatagarbha, which abides like gold in rocks.

The sutra also states that even though the storehouse consciousness has a pure aspect, this is not seen until the consciousness is purified through samādhi. This is compared to how gold does not shine inside gold ore until it is cleansed of the surrounding rock. Another simile compares the pure consciousness to butter, which only appears when the milk is churned.

The Ghanavyūha also compares the tathāgatagarbha with the moon, which seems to wane and to arise from the perspective of ignorant beings, but the moon itself does not truly arise or wane. The sutra also equates the tathāgatagarbha with the perfected nature (one of Yogācāra "three natures").

According to the Ghanavyūha, the storehouse consciousness which abides in the body of sentient beings, is the cause of both the defiled things of samsara and of all pure phenomena, like the meditations of noble beings and the buddhafields. Likewise, it is because of the pure stainless storehouse consciousness that bodhisattvas will become Buddhas.

Also like the Laṅkāvatāra, the Ghanavyūha states that the realization of the Buddha transcends all language and is free of all discriminating thought.

The sutra also discusses the nature of Ghanavyūha, the supreme buddhafield. It states that through following virtuous teachers, hearing and contemplating the Dharma, and letting go of all concepts and cravings, one can be reborn there, achieve enlightenment, and manifest in countless ways to help all beings.

== Influence ==
The sutra was known to Indian authors like Bhaviveka (c. 6th century), who saw it as one of the Yogacara sutras which were not of definitive meaning, but were only provisional (neyartha).

In Chinese Buddhism, the sutra was important to the Huayan school. The Huayan patriarch Fazang wrote a commentary on it, the Dasheng miyan jing shu (大乘密嚴經疏, no. X368 in the supplement to the Taishō canon, Xu zang jing 續藏經 vol. 34). He also assisted in the first translation of the text into Chinese. According to Fazang's doctrinal classification system, the Ghanavyūha belongs to the highest class of scriptures, those related to "the dependent arising out of the tathāgatagarbha," a class of texts which also includes the Laṅkāvatāra and the Awakening of Faith.

The Chan and Huayan patriarch Zongmi also cites the Ghanavyūha along with the Avataṃsaka Sūtra, the Sutra of Perfected Enlightenment and the Śrīmālādevī as scriptures which expound the teaching of sudden awakening, which Zongmi saw as being equivalent to the highest form of Chan (Zen). The Ghanavyūha sūtra was also cited by the 8th century Chan monk Heshang Moheyan in defense of his "sudden awakening" doctrine.

In Tibetan Buddhism, the Ghanavyūha sūtra is classified as one of the "Tathāgatagarbha sūtras of definitive meaning" (nges don snying po'i mdo) and it is cited by Tibetan traditions which rely on these teachings, such as Jonang, Kagyu and Nyingma. The Ghanavyūha sūtra was an important source for the Jonang school and it was considered by shentong scholars like Dolpopa and Taranatha as one of the "sutras of definitive meaning". Likewise, the sutra was cited by the Jonang scholar Blo bzang mchog grub rgya mtsho (1880-1940) and by the Kagyu scholar Jamgon Kongtrul as a definitive sutra of the final dharma-wheel. It is also cited by the Nyingma scholar Dudjom Jigdral Yeshe Dorje.

Scenes from the Ghanavyūha sūtra are depicted in cave shrine murals around Dunhuang, indicating its importance for Central Asian Buddhism.
