= Saṃbhogakāya =

Concept in Buddhism

Saṃbhogakāya (Sanskrit: संभोगकाय, lit. 'body of enjoyment', Chinese: 報身; pinyin: bàoshēn, Tib: ལོངས་སྤྱོད་རྫོག་པའི་སྐུ། longs spyod rdzog pa'i sku) is the second of three aspects of a buddha.

Sambhogakāya is a "subtle body of limitless form". Buddhas such as Bhaisajyaguru and Amitābha, as well as advanced bodhisattvas such as Avalokiteśvara and Manjusri can appear in an "enjoyment-body." A Buddha can appear in an "enjoyment-body" to teach bodhisattvas through visionary experiences.

Those Buddhas and Bodhisattvas manifest themselves in their specific pure lands. These worlds are created for the benefits of others. In those lands it is easy to hear and practice the Dharma. A person can be reborn in such a pure land by "the transfer of some of the huge stock of 'merit' of a Land's presiding Buddha, stimulated by devout prayer."

One of the places where the Sambhogakāya appears is the extra-cosmic realm or pure land called Akaniṣṭha. This realm should not be confused with the akanistha of the pure abodes, for it is a realm that completely transcends it.

Absolutely seen, only Dharmakāya is real; Sambhogakāya and Nirmāṇakāya are "provisional ways of talking about and apprehending it."

== Understanding in Buddhist tradition ==
=== Tibetan Buddhism ===
There are numerous Sambhogakāya realms almost as numerous as deities in Tibetan Buddhism. These Sambhogakaya-realms are known as Buddha-fields or Pure Lands.

One manifestation of Sambhogakaya in Tibetan Buddhism is the rainbow body. This is where an advanced practitioner is walled up in a cave or sewn inside a small yurt-like tent shortly before death. For a period of a week or so after death, the practitioners' body transforms into a Sambhogakaya (light body), leaving behind only hair and nails.

Lopön Tenzin Namdak as rendered by John Myrdhin Reynolds conveyed the relationship of the mindstream (Sanskrit: citta santana) of Sambhogakaya that links Dharmakaya with Nirmanakaya.

=== Chan Buddhism ===
In Chan Buddhism (including Japanese Zen), the Sambhogakāya, along with the Dharmakāya and the Nirmāṇakāya, are given metaphorical interpretations.

In the Platform Sutra, Huineng describes the Sambhogakāya as a state in which the practitioner continually and naturally produces good thoughts:

Do not think of the past; always think of the future; if your future thoughts are always good, you may be called the Sambhogakāya Buddha. An instant of thought of evil will result in the destruction of good which has continued a thousand years; an instant of thought of good compensates for a thousand years of evil and destruction.

== See also ==
- Divine embodiment
- Refuge tree
- Yidam
- Saguna Brahman
