= Nirmāṇakāya =

Concept in Buddhism

Nirmāṇakāya or Nirmanakaya also known as the Emanation body (simplified Chinese: 应身; traditional Chinese: 應身; pinyin: yìngshēn; Tibetan: སྤྲུལ་སྐུ་, tulku, Wylie: sprul sku) is the third aspect of the trikāya and the physical manifestation of a Buddha in time and space. An example of a Nirmanakaya would be Siddhartha Gautama, the historical Buddha who lived in India 2,500 years ago. In Vajrayāna Buddhism, the nirmanakaya is described as "the dimension of ceaseless manifestation".

== Indian Buddhism ==
One early Buddhist text, the Pali Samaññaphala Sutta, lists the ability to create a “mind-made body” (manomāyakāya) as one of the "fruits of the contemplative life". Commentarial texts such as the Patisambhidamagga and the Visuddhimagga state that this mind-made body is how Gautama Buddha and arhats are able to travel into heavenly realms using the continuum of the mindstream (cittasaṃtāna) and it is also used to explain the multiplication miracle of the Buddha as illustrated in the Divyavadana, in which the Buddha multiplied his nirmita or emanated human form into countless other bodies which filled the sky. A Buddha or other realized being is able to project many such nirmitas simultaneously in an infinite variety of forms in different realms simultaneously.

The Indian Buddhist philosopher Vasubandhu (fl. 4th to 5th century CE) defined nirmita as a siddhi or psychic power (Pali iddhi, Sanskrit: ṛddhi) developed through Buddhist discipline, concentrated discipline (samadhi) and wisdom in his seminal work on Buddhist philosophy, the Abhidharmakośakārikā. Asanga's Bodhisattvabhūmi defines nirmāṇa as a magical illusion and "basically, something without a material basis." The Madhyamaka school of philosophy sees all reality as empty of essence; all reality is seen as a form of nirmita or magical illusion.

== Tibetan Buddhism ==
In Tibetan Buddhism, nirmanakayas are emanations of the Sambhoghakaya of the Buddhas, which effortlessly arise due to the compassionate energy (thugs rje) of the Buddhas. According to Jigme Lingpa, nirmanakaya (emanations) appear "according to the different perceptions, dispositions, and aspirations" of sentient beings. He also states that "their enlightened activities, which remove the delusions of samsara, are as limitless as the boundless reaches of space."

In Tibetan Buddhism, there are various types of tulkus or nirmanakaya. According to the Nyingma scholar yogi Jigme Lingpa, the main classifications include:

- Natural nirmanakaya or nature nirmanakaya (Tibetan: rang bzhin sprul pa), this is a nirmanakaya which is "in harmony with the sambhoghakaya" according to Jigme Lingpa. These include the five tathagathas as they appear to bodhisattvas in the sambhoghakaya buddhafield of Akanishtha Ghanavyuha. Jigme Lingpa explains that "Since this reflection is similar to the Teacher as he appears in his own self-experience, it is counted as sambhogakaya. And since it is perceived by beings to be guided, it is counted also as nirmanakaya. Thus it has a status that is half nirmanakaya and half sambhogakaya (phyed sprul longs sku’i gnos)".
- Supreme nirmanakaya (Sanskrit: uttamanirmāṇakāya; Tibetan: མཆོག་གི་སྤྲུལ་སྐུ་, mchog gi sprul sku), such as Shakyamuni Buddha who displayed the twelve deeds and the major and minor marks of a Buddha. Supreme nirmanakayas also have numerous secondary emanations, and these may be quite varied. For example, Jigme Lingpa states that "in the various realms of the gods, they appear as their respective Lords (Brahma, Indra, Vishnu, and so on)". They may also appear as Chakravartins, as animals in the animal realm (a lion etc) and so on. These secondary emanations also teach in numerous varied ways, for example, in one realm called "Incense-All-Amassed", these emanations teach through scent and smell, on other realms they teach through dreams.
- Diverse nirmanakaya (Tibetan: sna tshogs sprul pa), these nirmanakayas manifest in numerous ways and forms to help sentient beings in any way possible, these may even include seemingly inanimate objects like boats or bridges. There are many forms and types of these, and can include:
  - Born or animate diversified nirmanakayas (Sanskrit: janmanirmāṇakāya; Tibetan: སྐྱེ་བ་སྤྲུལ་སྐུ, skye ba sprul sku) are the emanations of Buddhas who are born in the world in a natural way (womb, egg, etc) and guide sentient beings in various forms, like a king, a bodhisattva, and so on.
  - Inanimate diversified nirmanakaya, inanimate emanations, like valleys, mountains, boats and bridges
  - Artisan nirmanakayas (Sanskrit: śilpanirmāṇakāya or śilpinnirmāṇakāya; Standard Tibetan: བཟོ་བོ་སྤྲུལ་སྐུ་, bzo bo sprul sku) the emanation which appears like an artist or artisan (or even as a work of art) in order to awaken beings

== See also ==
- Dharmakāya
- Saṃbhogakāya
- Jiva, related concept of the infinite manifestation illusion
- Avatar
