= Dharmakāya =

One of the three bodies of a Buddha

The dharmakāya (Sanskrit: धर्मकाय, "truth body" or "reality body", Chinese: 法身; pinyin: fǎshēn, Tibetan: ཆོས་སྐུ་, Wylie: chos sku) is one of the three bodies (trikāya) of a Buddha in Mahāyāna Buddhism. The dharmakāya constitutes the unmanifested, "inconceivable" (acintya) aspect of a Buddha out of which Buddhas arise and to which they return after their dissolution. When a Buddha manifests out of the dharmakāya in a physical body of flesh and blood, which is perceptible to ordinary sentient beings, this is called a nirmāṇakāya, "transformation body".

The Dhammakāya tradition of Thailand and the Tathāgatagarbha sūtras of the ancient Indian tradition view the dharmakāya as the ātman (true self) of the Buddha present within all beings.

== Origins and development ==
=== Pāli Canon ===
In the Pāli Canon, Gautama Buddha tells that the Tathāgata (the Thus Come Ones) is dharmakāya because his body is attained with dharma.

He whose faith in the Tathagata is settled, rooted, established, solid, unshakeable by any ascetic or Brahmin, any deva or mara or Brahma or anyone in the world, can truly say: 'I am a true son of Blessed Lord (Bhagavan), born of his mouth, born of Dhamma, created by Dhamma, an heir of Dhamma.' Why is that? Because, Vasettha, this designates the Tathagata: 'The Body of Dhamma,' that is, 'The Body of Brahma,' or 'Become Dhamma,' that is, 'Become Brahma'.

=== Trikaya doctrine ===
The trikaya doctrine (Sanskrit, literally "three bodies" or "three personalities") is a Buddhist teaching both on the nature of reality, and the appearances of a Buddha.

The dharmakaya doctrine was possibly first expounded in the Aṣṭasāhasrikā Prajñāpāramitā, composed in the 1st century BCE.

Around 300 CE, the yogacara school systematized the prevalent ideas on the nature of the Buddha in the trikaya "three-body" doctrine. According to this doctrine, buddhahood has three aspects:

1. The nirmāṇakāya, "transformation body"
2. The sambhogakāya, "enjoyment-body"
3. The dharmakāya, "dharma-body"

=== Qualities ===
Tulku Thondup states that dharmakaya must possess three great qualities:

1. Great purity (Wylie: spang pa chen po, "the great abandonment"),
2. Great realization (Wylie: rtogs pa chen po),
3. Great mind (Wylie: sems pa chen po).

== Interpretation in Buddhist traditions ==
=== Mahāsāṃghika ===
According to Guang Xing, two main aspects of the Buddha can be seen in Mahāsāṃghika teachings: the true Buddha who is omniscient and omnipotent, and the manifested forms through which he liberates sentient beings through skillful means. For the Mahāsaṃghikas, the historical Gautama Buddha was one of these transformation bodies (Skt. nirmāṇakāya), while the essential real Buddha is equated with the dharmakāya.

=== Sarvāstivāda ===
Sarvāstivādins viewed the Buddha's physical body (Skt. rūpakāya) as being impure and improper for taking refuge in, and they instead regarded taking refuge in the Buddha as taking refuge in the dharmakāya of the Buddha. As stated in the Mahāvibhāṣā:

Some people say that to take refuge in the Buddha is to take refuge in the body of the Tathāgata, which comprises head, neck, stomach, back, hands and feet. It is explained that the body, born of father and mother, is composed of defiled dharmas, and therefore is not a source of refuge. The refuge is the Buddha's fully accomplished qualities (aśaikṣadharmāḥ) which comprise bodhi and the dharmakāya.

=== Theravāda ===
In the Pali Canon of Theravada Buddhism, the Dhammakāya (dharmakāya) is explained as a figurative term, meaning the "body" or the sum of the Buddha's teachings. The Canon does not invest the term dhammakāya with a metaphysical or unrealistic connotation. Jantrasrisalai disagrees though, arguing that the term originally was more connected with the process of enlightenment than the way it later came to be interpreted. In all references to dhammakāya in early Buddhist usage, it is apparent that dhammakāya is linked always with the process of enlightenment in one way or another. Its relation with the Buddhist noble ones of all types is evident in the early Buddhist texts. That is to say, dhammakāya is not exclusive to the Buddha. It appears also that the term’s usage in the sense of teaching is a later schema rather than being the early Buddhist common notions as generally understood. (Note: Jantrasrisalai 2008, p. 288: "In all references to dhammakāya in early Buddhist usage, it is apparent that dhammakāya is linked always with the process of enlightenment in one way or another. Its relation with the Buddhist noble ones of all types is evident in the early Buddhist texts. That is to say, dhammakāya is not exclusive to the Buddha. It appears also that the term’s usage in the sense of teaching is a later schema rather than being the early Buddhist common notions as generally understood.")

In the atthakathās (commentaries on the Buddhist texts), the interpretation of the word depends on the author. Though both Buddhaghoṣa and Dhammapāla describe dhammakāya as the nine supramundane states (navalokuttaradhamma), their interpretations differ in other aspects. Buddhaghoṣa always follows the canonical interpretation, referring to the teaching of the lokuttaradhammas, but Dhammapāla interprets dhammakāya as the spiritual attainments of the Buddha. Dhammapāla's interpretation is still essentially Theravāda though, since the Buddha is still considered a human being, albeit an enlightened one. The Buddha's body is still subject to kamma and limited in the same way as other people's bodies are.

In a post-canonical Sri Lankan text called Saddharmaratnākaraya, a distinction is drawn between four different kāyas: the rūpakāya, dharmakāya, nimittakāya and suñyakāya. The rūpakāya refers to the four jhānas here; the dharmakāya refers to the attainment of the first eight of the nine lokuttaradhammas; the nimittakāya refers to the final lokuttaradhamma: Nibbāna with a physical remainder (sopadisesanibbāna); and the suñyakāya refers to Nibbāna without physical remainder (anupādisesanibbāna). However, even this teaching of four kāyas does not really stray outside of orthodox Theravāda tradition.

In a more unorthodox approach, Maryla Falk has made the argument that in the earliest form of Buddhism, a yogic path existed which involved the acquisition of a manomayakāya or dhammakāya and an amatakāya, in which the manomayakāya or dhammakāya refers to the attainment of the jhānas, and the amatakāya to the attainment of insight and the culmination of the path. In this case, the kāyas refer to a general path and fruit, not only to the person of the Buddha. Although Reynolds does not express agreement with Falk's entire theory, he does consider the idea of an earlier yogic strand worthy of investigation. Furthermore, he points out that there are remarkable resemblances with interpretations that can be found in Yogāvacara texts, often called Tantric Theravada.

The usage of the word dhammakāya is common in Tantric Theravāda texts. It is also a common term in later texts concerning the consecration of Buddha images. In these later texts, which are often descriptions of kammaṭṭhāna (meditation methods), different parts of the body of the Buddha are associated with certain spiritual attainments, and the practitioner determines to pursue these attainments himself. The idea that certain characteristics or attainments of the Buddha can be pursued is usually considered a Mahāyāna idea, but unlike Mahāyāna, Yogāvacara texts do not describe the Buddha in ontological terms, and commonly use only Theravāda terminology.

==== Dhammakaya tradition ====
The Dhammakaya tradition and some monastic members of Thai Theravada Buddhism, who specialise on meditation, have doctrinal elements which distinguish it from some Theravāda Buddhist scholars who have tried to claim themselves as the orthodox Buddhists. Basing itself on the Pali suttas and meditative experience, the tradition teaches that the dhammakaya is the eternal Buddha within all beings. The dhammakaya is nibbāna, and nibbāna is equated with the true self (as opposed to the non-self). In some respects its teachings resemble the buddha-nature doctrines of Mahayana Buddhism. Paul Williams has commented that this view of Buddhism is similar to ideas found in the shentong teachings of the Jonang school of Tibet made famous by Dolpopa Sherab Gyaltsen.

The Thai meditation masters who teach of a true self of which they claim to have gained meditative experience are not rejected by Thai Buddhists in general, but tend, on the contrary, to be particularly revered and worshipped in Thailand as arahats or even bodhisattvas, far more so than more orthodox Theravada monks and scholars.

=== Mahāyāna ===
==== Prajnaparamita ====
According to Paul Williams, there are three ways of seeing the concept of the dharmakaya in the prajnaparamita sutras:

First, the dharmakaya is the collection of teachings, particularly the Prajñaparamita itself. Second, it is the collection of pure dharmas possessed by the Buddha, specifically pure mental dharmas cognizing emptiness. And third, it comes to refer to emptiness itself, the true nature of things. The dharmakaya in all these senses is contrasted with the Buddha’s physical body, that which lived and died and is preserved in stupas.

==== Lotus Sutra ====
In the Lotus Sutra (Chapter 16: The Life Span of Thus Come One, sixth fascicle) the Buddha explains that he has always and will always exist to lead beings to their salvation.

==== Tathāgatagarbha ====
In the tathagatagarbha sutric tradition, the dharmakaya is taught by the Buddha to constitute the transcendental, blissful, eternal, and pure Self of the Buddha. "These terms are found in sutras such as the Lankavatara, Gandavyuha, Angulimaliya, Srimala, and the Mahaparinirvana, where they are used to describe the Buddha, the Truth Body (dharmakaya) and the Buddha-nature." They are the "transcendent results [of spiritual attainment]".

==== Tibetan Buddhism ====
In Tibetan, the term chos sku (ཆོས་སྐུ།, phonetically written as chö-ku) glosses dharmakāya; it is composed of chos "religion, dharma" and sku "body, form, image, bodily form, figure". Thondup & Talbott render it as the "ultimate body". Gyurme Dorje and Thupten Jinpa define "Buddha-body of Reality", which is a rendering of the Tibetan chos-sku and the Sanskrit dharmakāya, as:

[T]he ultimate nature or essence of the enlightened mind [byang-chub sems], which is uncreated (skye-med), free from the limits of conceptual elaboration (spros-pa'i mtha'-bral), empty of inherent existence (rang-bzhin-gyis stong-pa), naturally radiant, beyond duality and spacious like the sky. The intermediate state of the time of death (chi-kha'i bar-do) is considered to be an optimum time for the realisation of the Buddha-body of Reality.

The Dalai Lama defines the dharmakaya as "the realm of the Dharmakaya—the space of emptiness—where all phenomena, pure and impure, are dissolved. This is the explanation taught by the Sutras and Tantras." However he also states that it is distinct from the Hindu concept of Brahman because Buddhism adheres to the doctrine of emptiness (sunyata).

===== Rime movement =====
According to Jamgon Kongtrul, the founder of the Rimé movement, in his 19th century commentary to the Lojong slogan, "To see confusion as the four kayas, the sunyata protection is unsurpassable", "When you rest in a state where appearances simply appear but there is no clinging to them, the dharmakaya aspect is that all appearances are empty in nature, the sambhogakāya is that they appear with clarity, the nirmanakaya is that this emptiness and clarity occur together, and the natural kāya aspect is that these are inseparable."

== Iconography ==
=== Emptiness ===
In the early traditions of Buddhism, depictions of Gautama Buddha were neither iconic nor aniconic but depictions of empty space and absence: petrosomatoglyphs (images of a part of the body carved in rock), for example.

=== Sky blue ===
Thondup and Talbott identify dharmakaya with the naked ("sky-clad"; Sanskrit: Digāmbara), unornamented, sky-blue Samantabhadra:

In Nyingma icons, dharmakāya is symbolized by a naked, sky-coloured (light blue) male and female Buddha in union [Kāmamudrā], called Samantabhadra [and Samantabhadrī]. (Note: For further discussion of 'Kāmamudrā' (English: "love-seal") refer: mudra, Mahamudra and Yab-Yum.)

Fremantle states:

Space is simultaneously the first and the last of the great elements. It is the origin and precondition of the other four, and it is also their culmination... The Sanskrit word for space is the same as for the sky: akasha, which means "shining and clear." What is it that we call the sky? It marks the boundary of our vision, the limit our sight can reach. If we could see more clearly, the sky would extend infinitely into outer space. The sky is an imaginary boundary set by the limitations of our senses, and also by the limitations of our mind, since we find it almost impossible to imagine a totally limitless [U]niverse. Space is the dimension in which everything exists. It is all-encompassing, all-pervading, and boundless. It is synonymous with emptiness: that emptiness which is simultaneously fullness.

The colour blue is an iconographic polysemic rendering of the mahābhūta element of the "pure light" of space (Sanskrit: आकाश ākāśa).

The conceptually bridging and building poetic device of analogy, as an exemplar where dharmakaya is evocatively likened to sky and space, is a persistent and pervasive visual metaphor throughout the early Dzogchen and Nyingma literature and functions as a linkage and conduit between the 'conceptual' and 'conceivable' and the 'ineffable' and 'inconceivable' (Sanskrit: acintya). It is particularly referred to by the terma Gongpa Zangtel, (Note: Wylie: kun tu bzang po'i dgongs pa zang thal du bstan pa; English: Direct Revelation of Samantabhadra's Mind.) a terma cycle revealed by Rigdzin Gödem (1337–1408) and part of the Nyingma "Northern Treasures" (Wylie: byang gter).

=== Mirror ===
Sawyer conveys the importance of melong ('mirror') iconography to dharmakaya:

The looking glass/mirror (T. me-long, Skt. adarsa), which represents the dharmakaya or Truth Body, having the aspects of purity (a mirror is clear of pollution) and wisdom (a mirror reflects all phenomena without distinction).

== See also ==
- Brahman, especially Para Brahman
