= Rimé movement =

Non-sectarian movement within Tibetan Buddhism

- Rimé
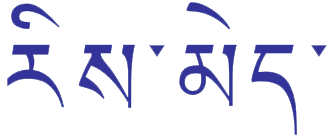
- Rimé in Tibetan letters

Tibetan name
- Tibetan: རིས་མེད་
- Literal meaning: "unbiased"
Transcriptions
- Wylie: ris med
- THL: ri mé
- Tibetan Pinyin: Rimê

Chinese name
- Traditional Chinese: 利美運動
- Simplified Chinese: 利美运动
Transcriptions
Standard Mandarin
- Hanyu Pinyin: Lìměi Yùndòng

The Rimé movement (Tibetan Wylie: ris med; approximate pronunciation "reemay") also written in some English sources as Rime, Ri-me, Rimay) is a movement or tendency in Tibetan Buddhism which promotes non-sectarianism and universalism. Teachers from all branches of Tibetan Buddhism – Nyingma, Kagyu, Sakya, Gelug, Jonang – and from Bon have been involved in the promoting of Rimé ideals.

According to Sam van Schaik, eclectic and non-sectarian tendencies existed in Tibetan Buddhism before the 19th century, and figures like Tsongkhapa, Longchenpa and Shabkar are widely known to have studied with teachers from different traditions. However, political divisions and religious sectarianism increased during a period of warfare in the sixteenth and seventeenth centuries. This was a time when the Gelug school was the politically dominant religion and Gelug lamas were also the political leaders of Tibet (see Ganden Phodrang).

During the 19th century, having seen how the Gelug institutions pushed the other traditions into the corners of Tibet's cultural life, Jamyang Khyentse Wangpo (1820–1892) and Jamgön Kongtrül (1813–1899) compiled together the teachings of the Sakya, Kagyu, and Nyingma, including many near-extinct teachings. Without Khyentse and Kongtrul's collecting and printing of rare works, the suppression of all other Buddhist sects by the Gelugpas would have been much more final. The Rimé movement is responsible for a number of scriptural compilations, such as the Rinchen Terdzod and the Sheja Dzö.

Figures like the 14th Dalai Lama, the 16th Karmapa, and Sakya Trizin are well known promoters of Rimé ideals.

== The Rimé approach ==
Most scholars of Buddhism explain Rimé as an "eclectic movement". Scholar Seyfort Ruegg has suggested this description is inadequate, saying: "In fact this Rimé movement was not exactly eclectic but universalistic (and encyclopaedic), rimed (pa) (the antonym of risu ch'edpa) meaning unbounded, all-embracing, unlimited, and also impartial."

One of the most prominent contemporary Rimé masters, Ringu Tulku, emphasizes the message of the original Rimé founders, that it is not a new school. It is simply an approach allowing freedom of choice which was always the majority practice within the history of Tibetan Buddhism. The Karmapas, Je Tsongkhapa, the Dalai Lamas, Sakya lineage heads and major Nyingma and Kagyu figures took teachings and empowerments from various schools and lineages.

The movement's name is derived from two Tibetan words: ris (distinction, bias, side) and med (lack, absence), which combined makes an adjective and an adverb in literary Tibetan the common meaning of which is "without discrimination", "without distinction" (e.g. as equal compassion towards everyone alike). It was only in 20th century that the term was nominalized as a retrospective designation to the ideas and activities of the 19th century Rimé scholars, who did not form a conscious unified movement. In this sense, the term rimé expresses the idea of openness to other Tibetan Buddhist traditions, as opposed to sectarianism. The Rimé movement therefore is often misunderstood as trying to unite the various sects through their similarities. Rather Rimé was intended to recognize the differences between traditions and appreciate them, while also establishing a dialogue which would create common ground. It is considered important that variety be preserved, and therefore Rimé teachers are generally careful to emphasize differences in thought, giving students many options as to how to proceed in their spiritual training.

Ringu Tulku describes these points which are often misrepresented:

Ris or Phyog-ris in Tibetan means "one-sided", "partisan" or "sectarian". Med means "No". Ris-med (Wylie), or Rimé, therefore means "no sides", "non-partisan" or "non-sectarian". It does not mean "non-conformist" or "non-committal"; nor does it mean forming a new School or system that is different from the existing ones. A person who believes the Rimé way almost certainly follows one lineage as his or her main practice. He or she would not dissociate from the School in which he or she was raised. Kongtrul was raised in the Nyingma and Kagyu traditions; Khyentse was reared in a strong Sakyapa tradition. They never failed to acknowledge their affiliation to their own Schools.

Rimé is not a way of uniting different Schools and lineages by emphasizing their similarities. It is basically an appreciation of their differences and an acknowledgement of the importance of having this variety for the benefit of practitioners with different needs. Therefore the Rimé teachers always take great care that the teachings and practices of the different Schools and lineages and their unique styles do not become confused with one another. To retain the original style and methods of each teaching lineage preserves the power of that lineage experience. Kongtrul and Khyentse made great efforts to retain the original flavor of each teaching, while making them available to many. Kongtrul writes about Khyentse in his biography of the latter.... When he (Khyentse Rinpoche) taught, he would give the teachings of each lineage clearly and intelligibly without confusing the terms and concepts of other teachings.

Rimé was initially intended to counteract the novel growing suspicion and tension building between the different traditions, which at the time had, in many places, gone so far as to forbid studying one another's scriptures. Tibetan Buddhism has a long history of vigorous debate and argumentation between schools and within one's training. This can lead a practitioner to believe that one's school has the best approach or highest philosophic view and that other lineages have a lower or flawed understanding. The Rimé approach cautions against developing that viewpoint, while at the same time appreciating that the debate and discussion is important and that arguing which views are higher and lower is still valid discourse.

Jamgon Kongtrul pointed out the necessity of each practitioner to have a strong foundation in one school:

The scholars and siddhas of the various schools make their own individual presentations of the dharma. Each one is full of strong points and supported by valid reasoning. If you are well grounded in the presentations of your own tradition, then it is unnecessary to be sectarian. But if you get mixed up about the various tenets and the terminology, then you lack even a foothold in your own tradition. You try to use someone else's system to support your understanding, and then get all tangled up, like a bad weaver, concerning the view, meditation, conduct, and result. Unless you have certainty in your own system, you cannot use reasoning to support your scriptures, and you cannot challenge the assertions of others. You become a laughing stock in the eyes of the learned ones. It would be much better to possess a clear understanding of your own tradition.

In summary, one must see all the teachings as without contradiction, and consider all the scriptures as instructions. This will cause the root of sectarianism and prejudice to dry up, and give you a firm foundation in the Buddhas teachings. At that point, hundreds of doors to the eighty-four thousand teachings of the dharma will simultaneously be open to you.

A rimé practitioner may take empowerments from numerous lineages and living masters, though it is not a requirement to do so.

== Non-sectarianism prior to the 19th century ==
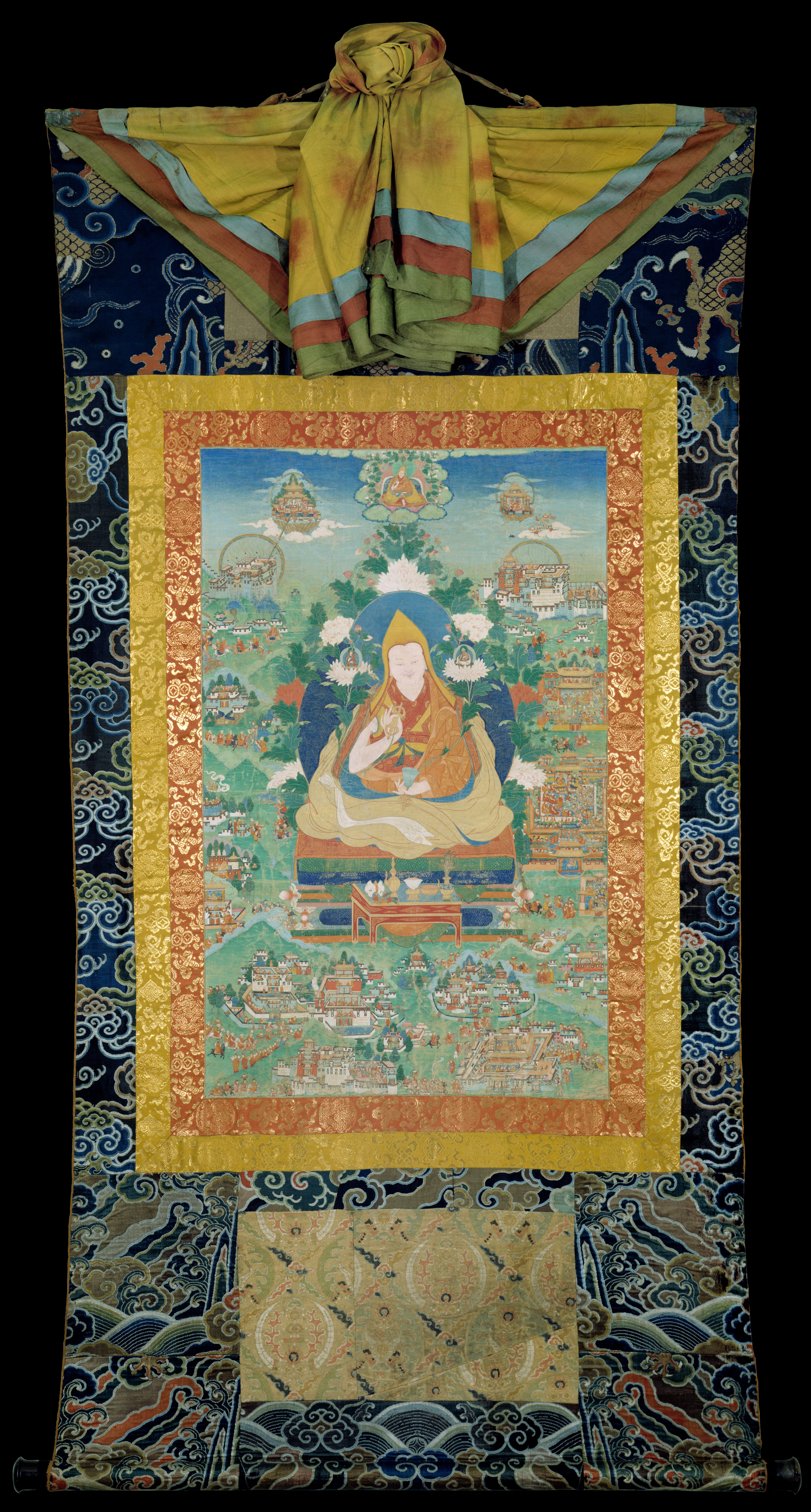
A thangka depicting the fifth Dalai Lama.

According to tibetologist Sam van Schaik:

This ideal of nonsectarianism – of not just tolerance, but a genuine appreciation and support for all schools of Tibetan Buddhism and Bon – was not unique to Derge. In Tibet's 'golden age' of the fourteenth and fifteenth centuries, nonsectarianism was the norm throughout Tibet, and figures such as Longchenpa and Tsongkhapa expected to study with teachers from different schools. The change began with the great sectarian wars that blighted Central Tibet in the sixteenth and seventeenth centuries, setting the Kagyu schools against the Gelug. The final victory of the Gelug school, on the shoulders of the Qoshot Mongol armies, sounded the death knell of the nonsectarian ideal.

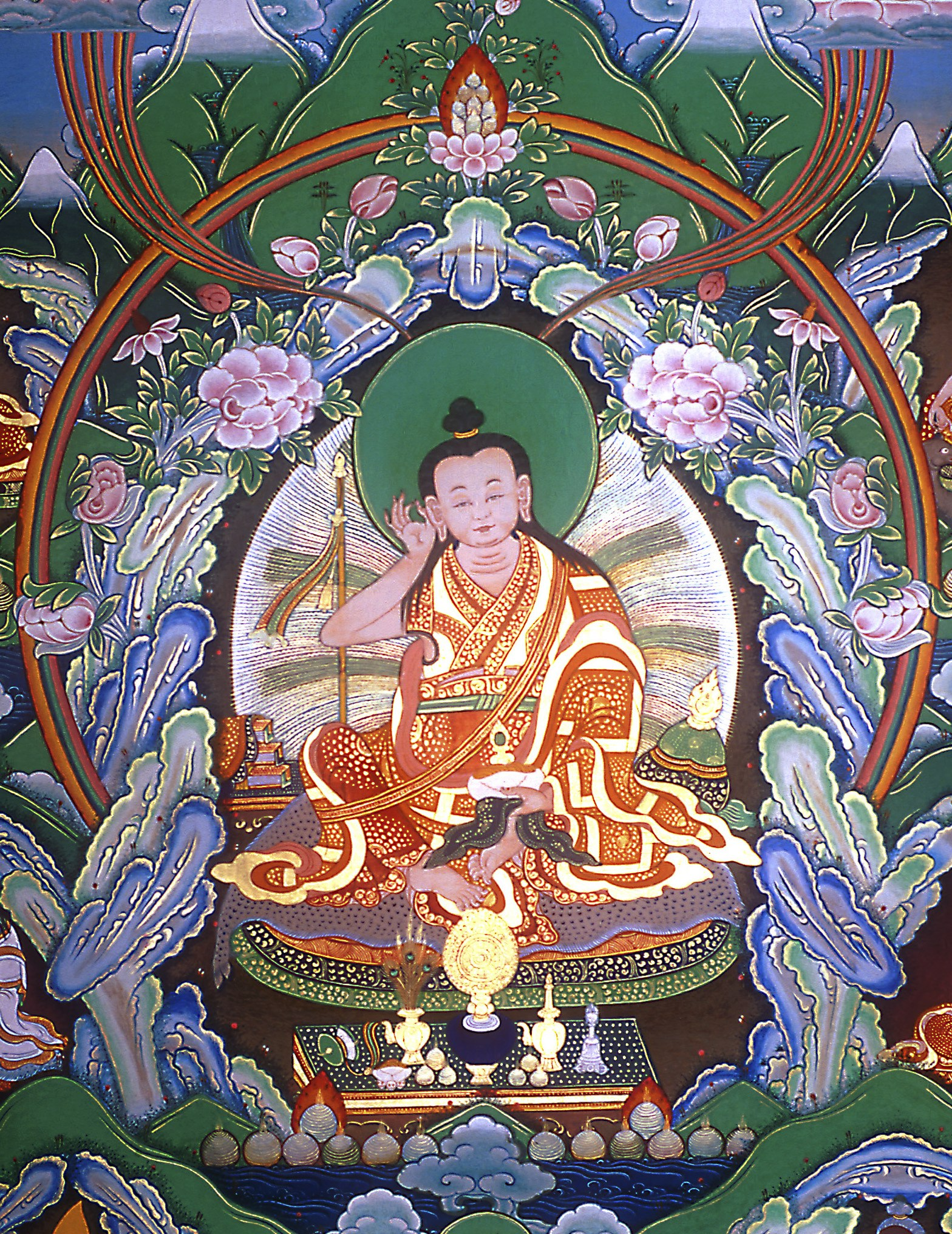
Shabkar Tsokdruk Rangdrol

According to Thupten Jinpa, "the Fifth Dalai Lama was personally an ecumenist who revered Tibet's other major Buddhist traditions, especially the Nyingma." In this he was influenced by his teacher Paljor Lhundrup who was a Gelug monk and master of the Nyingma Great Perfection (Dzogchen) tradition. The Fifth Dalai Lama, Ngawang Lobsang Gyatso, is also known as a terton who revealed a cycle of Dzogchen teachings known as the Sangwa Gyachen (Bearing the Seal of Secrecy). He also built the Lukhang temple behind the Potala Palace as a secret place to practice Dzogchen. The temple includes murals which illustrate Dzogchen practice according to the Dzogchen tantras.

Another Gelug figure who espoused a non-sectarian outlook was the Fifth Lelung Jedrung Lobzang Trinle (b.1697 – d.1740). Lobzang Trinle is known to have had many masters, including the Nyingma master Terdak Lingpa. Later in life, Lobzang Trinle wrote:

I have an un-fabricated pure vision toward all the accomplished [masters] without bias (ris med) such as the Sakya, Geluk, Nyingma, Drukpa Kagyu, Karma Kagyu, etc. My mind has increased respect toward the holders of these [various] teachings and when I think about this, I have pride in my own powerful realizations.

He is also known for having written a treatise which claims that Tsongkhapa was a reincarnation of Padmasambhava. He was also active in rebuilding Nyingma monasteries like Mindroling and Dorje Drak which had been destroyed by a Dzungar invasion. The Fifth Lelung Lobzang Trinle was also a terton.

According to José Cabezón, the Third Tukwan, Lobzang Chokyi Nyima, a great Gelug scholar, "wrote an important defense of the Rnying ma tradition in response to an anti-Rnying ma polemic written by one of his own teachers, Sum pa mkhan po (1704–88)."

Rachel H. Pang has noted that non-sectarian ideals are also strongly present in the works of Shabkar Tsokdruk Rangdrol (1781–1851), even though he predates the movement by about three decades and never met with any of the Rimé masters from Kham. Shabkar was a Gelug monk and a noted yogi of the Nyingma Great Perfection (Dzogchen) tradition. His works often criticize sectarian tendencies and defend the practice of multiple traditions.

A poem in Shabkar's autobiography criticizes sectarian tendencies:

Due to the kindness of holy forefathers of the past,

In the snow ranges

Many profound Dharma teachings spread.

However, Dharma practitioners,

Having grasped teachings as contradictory – like hot and cold,

Engage in sectarianism – attachment and aversion.

Some of the Holy Ones have said

That Madhyamaka, Dzogchen and Mahāmudrā

Are like sugar, molasses, and honey –

Each being as good as the other.

Thus, I have listened to and contemplated

On all the teachings without sectarian bias.

Sectarian practitioners with attachment and aversion

Please do not scold me.

When the sunlight of pure perception

Spreads on the lofty white snow mountains

That are Madhyamaka, Dzogchen and Mahāmudrā

== The 19th century Rimé movement ==
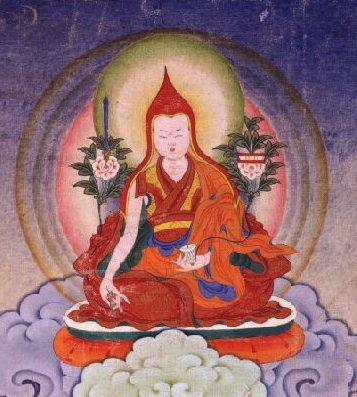
Jamyang Khyentse Wangpo

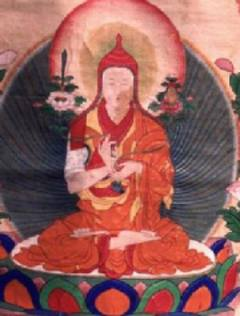
Jamgön Kongtrül Lodrö Thayé

Two of the founding voices of Rimé were Jamyang Khyentse Wangpo and Jamgon Kongtrul, both from different schools; the epithets Jamyang (Wylie: 'jam dbyangs, Sanskrit: Mañjughoṣa) and Jamgön (Wylie: 'jam mgon, Sanskrit: Mañjunātha) in their name indicating that they are considered to be emanations of Manjushri. Jamgön Kongtrul was from the Nyingma and Kagyu traditions, while Wangpo had been raised within the Sakya order. At the time, Tibetan schools of thought had become very isolated, and both Wangpo and Jamgon Kongtrul were instrumental in re-initiating dialogue between the sects.

The Rimé movement came to prominence at a point in Tibetan history when the religious climate had become partisan. The aim of the movement was "a push towards a middle ground where the various views and styles of the different traditions were appreciated for their individual contributions rather than being refuted, marginalized, or banned." Many of the teachings of various schools were close to being lost and the movement set out to preserve them. However, though the Rimé movement gathered together teachings from each of the various traditions, it did not mix these, but recognised the individual integrity of each.

The movement began within a large context of increasing domination by the Gelug school. Beginning in the 17th century, the Gelug view and politics increasingly dominated in Tibet and the minority lineages were at risk for losing their traditions. At its founding, the Rimé movement primarily consisted of non-Gelugpa teachers and, at times, the movement has appeared critical of Gelug views. Georges Dreyfus suggests this argumentation was less to create further division, but was to bolster minority views that had been marginalized by Gelug supremacy. Nonetheless, philosophic commentaries by early Rimé writers tend to criticize Gelugpa tenets.

However, Rimé was, in its idealized presentation, the re-establishment of a rule or principle that had always been present in Tibetan Buddhism, but that had been de-emphasized or forgotten: To ignorantly criticize other traditions was wrong, and that misunderstandings due to ignorance should be immediately alleviated. Ringu Tulku says:

The Rimé concept was not original to Kongtrul and Khyentse – neither were they new to Buddhism! The Lord Buddha forbade his students even to criticise the teachings and teachers of other religions and cultures. The message was so strong and unambiguous that Chandra Kirti had to defend Nagarjuna's treatises on Madhyamika by saying, "If, by trying to understand the truth, you dispel the misunderstandings of some people and thereby some philosophies are damaged – that cannot be taken as criticising the views of others" (Madhyamika-avatara). A true Buddhist cannot be but non-sectarian and Rimé in their approach.

The movement became particularly well-established in the Kingdom of Derge. Rimé has become an integral part of the Tibetan tradition, and continues to be an important philosophy in Tibetan Buddhism.

Other notable Tibetan Lamas noted for their non-sectarian approach were Patrul Rinpoche and Orgyen Chokgyur Lingpa, Shabkar Tsodruk Rangdrol, Dudjom Lingpa and the Khakyab Dorje, 15th Karmapa Lama, who was a student of Jamgön Kongtrul. Other lineage leaders gave their blessing to the movement and its founders, who were considered extremely realized.

In spite of the fact that the main figures of the movement were non-Gelug, there were some sympathetic Gelug figures who studied under Rime masters. The most famous of these was the 13th Dalai Lama, who was known to have an interest in Nyingma teachings and who took the great Terton Sogyal as a spiritual friend and guru. The 13th Dalai Lama was a Dzogchen practitioner, a terton (whose Nyingma name was Drakden Lingpa) and a practitioner of Vajrakilaya.

=== Persecution by Phabongkha and his disciples ===
David Kay notes that Dorje Shugden was a key element in Pabongkhapa Déchen Nyingpo's persecution of the Rimé movement:

As the Gelug agent of the Tibetan government in Kham (Khams) (Eastern Tibet), and in response to the Rimed movement that had originated and was flowering in that region, Phabongkha Rinpoche and his disciples employed repressive measures against non-Gelug sects. Religious artefacts associated with Padmasambhava – who is revered as a 'second Buddha' by Nyingma practitioners – were destroyed, and non-Gelug, and particularly Nyingma, monasteries were forcibly converted to the Gelug position. A key element of Phabongkha Rinpoche's outlook was the cult of the protective deity Dorje Shugden, which he married to the idea of Gelug exclusivism and employed against other traditions as well as against those within the Gelug who had eclectic tendencies.

His teaching tour of Kham in 1938 was a seminal phase, leading to a hardening of his exclusivism and the adoption of a militantly sectarian stance. In reaction to the flourishing Rimed movement and the perceived decline of Gelug monasteries in that region, Phabongkha and his disciples spearheaded a revival movement, promoting the supremacy of the Gelug as the only pure tradition. He now regarded the inclusivism of Gelug monks who practised according to the teachings of other schools as a threat to the integrity of the Gelug tradition, and he aggressively opposed the influence of other traditions, particularly the Nyingma, whose teachings were deemed mistaken and deceptive. A key element of Phabongkha's revival movement was the practice of relying upon Dorje Shugden, the main function of the deity now being presented as "the protection of the Ge-luk tradition through violent means, even including the killing of its enemies."

The Rimé movement, primarily composed of the Sakya, Kagyu and Nyingma schools, arose in the first place as a result of Gelug persecution.

== Present-day Rimé movement ==
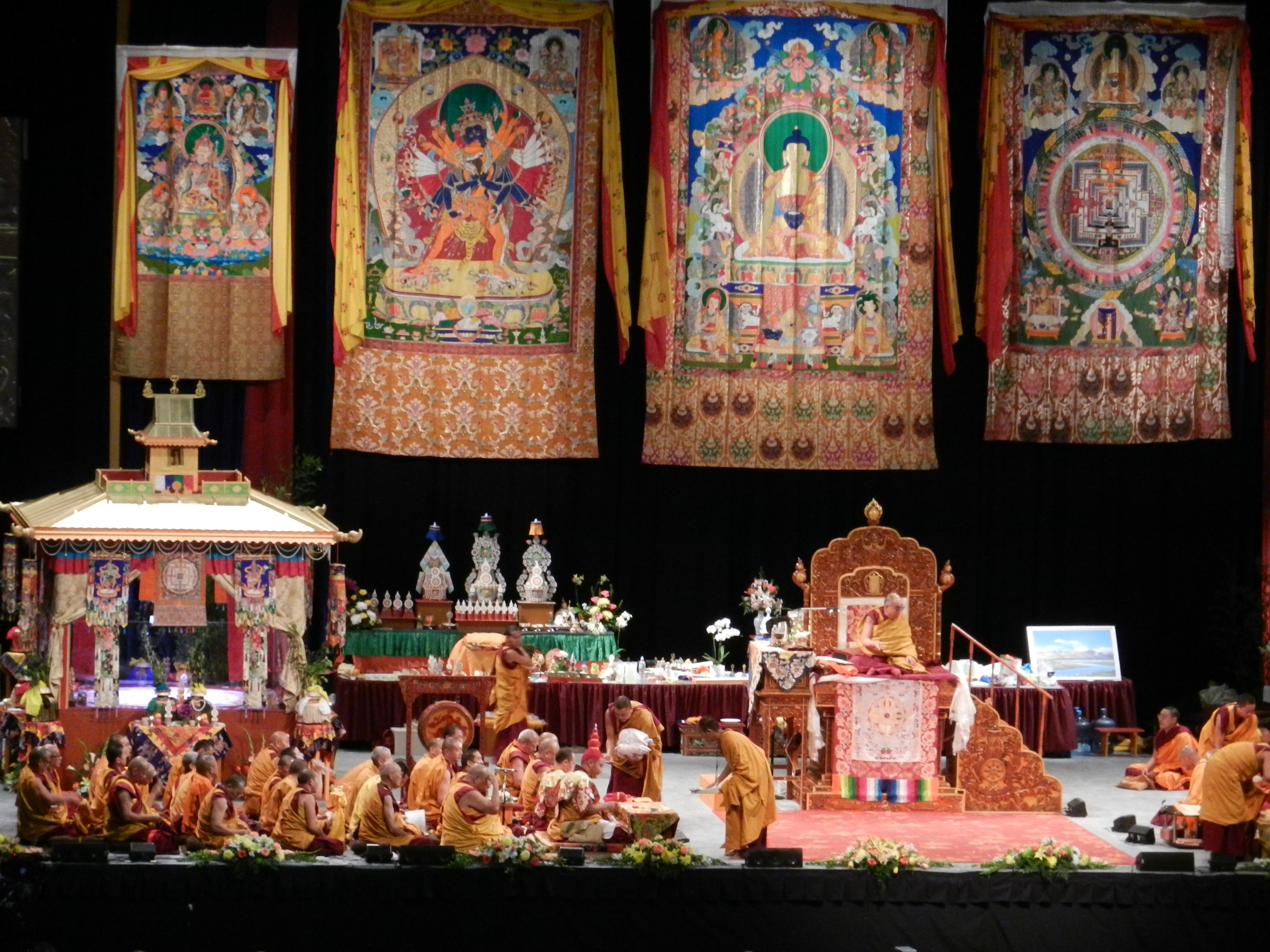
The 14th Dalai Lama and the Karmapa (wearing the red hat) during a Kalachakra initiation

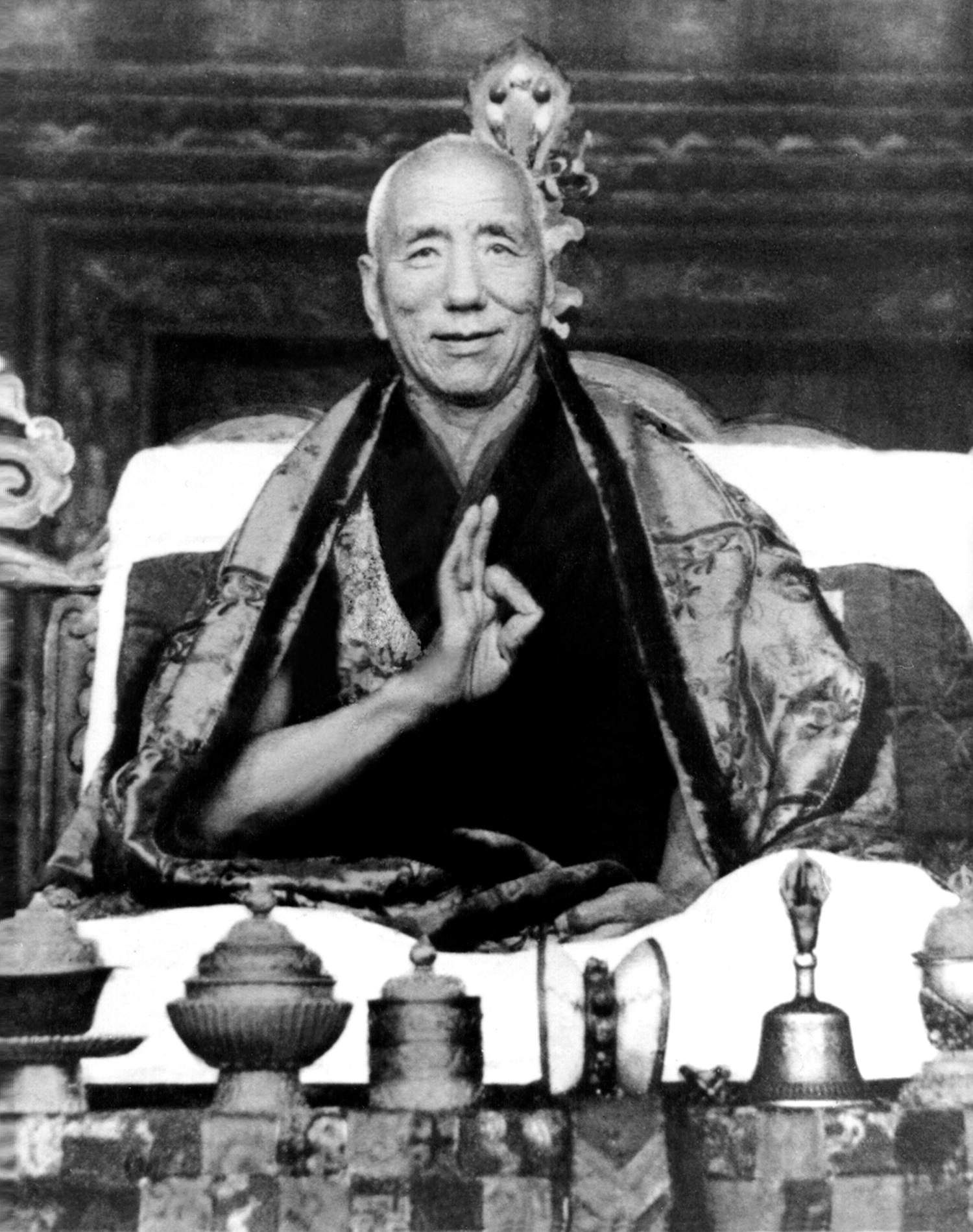
Dzongsar Khyentse Chokyi Lodro

The movement's achievements have been successful in the 20th century where taking teachings and transmissions from different schools and lineages has become the norm amongst many monastic students, lamas, yogis as well as lay practitioners. This has mainly been due to the proactive support of many lineage holders and various leaders such as the 13th and 14th Dalai Lamas, the 15th and 16th Karmapas, Sakya Trizin and Dudjom Jigdral Yeshe Dorje, following the "eclectic" approach of the 5th Dalai Lama "who blurred the lines between traditions".

The 14th Dalai Lama composed a prayer for the movement praising various historic figures and lineages of Vajrayana Buddhism from India and Tibet, part of which says:

In short, may all the teachings of the Buddha in the Land of Snows
Flourish long into the future— the ten great pillars of the study lineage,
And the chariots of the practice lineage, such as Shijé ('Pacifying') and the rest,
All of them rich with their essential instructions combining sutra and mantra.

May the lives of the masters who uphold these teachings be secure and harmonious!
May the sangha preserve these teachings through their study, meditation and activity!
May the world be filled with faithful individuals intent on following these teachings!
And long may the non-sectarian teachings of the Buddha continue to flourish!

Dzongsar Khyentse Chökyi Lodrö, Khunu Lama Tenzin Gyaltsen and Dilgo Khyentse are recent Rimé masters, known for their public influence and as being advisers and teachers to the 14th Dalai Lama. Other modern adherents include the late 16th Karmapa and 2nd Dudjom Rinpoche, both of whom gave extensive teachings from the works of Jamgon Kongtrul Lodro, as well as Akong Rinpoche who, with the late Chögyam Trungpa, helped establish Tibetan Buddhism in the United Kingdom. The lineage of the late Nyoshul Khenpo Rinpoche is represented today in the teachings of Surya Das.

The 14th Dalai Lama supports and encourages a non-sectarian spirit. Major Gelug figures like Shabkar in the 19th century, and the Panchen Lamas and Reting Rinpoche in the 20th century studied Nyingma teachings along with their Gelug training. 8th Arjia Rinpoche continues the Rimé tradition in the United States.

Bön teacher Tenzin Wangyal cautions, however, that even this so-called non-sectarian attitude may be taken to an extreme:

A problem that seems very difficult to avoid involves the tendency of spiritual schools either to want to preserve their traditions in a very closed way or to want to be very open and nonsectarian; but there is often the danger that this very nonsectarianism can become a source of self-justification and lead to as closed an attitude as that of the sectarians.

In 1993, a Conference of Western Buddhist Teachers held in Dharamsala, India. The teachers present agreed on the following non-sectarian outlook:

In the West, where so many different Buddhist traditions exist side by side, one needs to be constantly on one's guard against the danger of sectarianism. Such a divisive attitude is often the result of failing to understand or appreciate anything outside one's own tradition. Teachers from all schools would therefore benefit greatly from studying and gaining some practical experience of the teachings of other traditions.

Modern proponents of the Rimé movement have played an important role in preservation of the mind teachings of Tibet found in the Kagyu and Nyingma lineages.

== See also ==
- Abrahamic religions
- Ecumenism
- Inclusivism
- Religious exclusivism
- Religious pluralism
