= Shangri-La =

Fictional location in the Himalayas

Shangri-La is a fictional place in Tibet's Kunlun Mountains, described in the 1933 novel Lost Horizon by the British author James Hilton. Hilton portrays Shangri-La as a mystical, harmonious valley, gently guided from a lamasery, enclosed in the western end of the Kunlun Mountains. In the novel, the people who live in Shangri-La are almost immortal, living hundreds of years beyond the normal lifespan and only very slowly ageing in appearance.

Shangri-La has become synonymous with any earthly paradise, particularly a mythical Himalayan utopia – an enduringly happy land, isolated from the world. Ancient Tibetan scriptures mention Nghe-Beyul Khembalung, one of seven utopian beyuls which Tibetan Buddhists believe were established in the 9th century AD by Padmasambhava as hidden, sacred places of refuge for Buddhists during times of strife.

== Possible sources for Hilton ==
In an interview in 1936 for The New York Times, Hilton states that he used "Tibetan material" from the British Museum, particularly the travelogue of two French Catholic priests, Évariste Régis Huc and Joseph Gabet, to provide the Tibetan cultural and Buddhist spiritual inspiration for Shangri-La. Huc and Gabet travelled a round trip between Peking and Lhasa in 1844–1846 on a route more than 250 kilometres (160 mi) north of Yunnan. Their famous travelogue, first published in French in 1850, went through many editions in many languages. A popular "condensed translation" was published in Britain in 1928.

When asked what real-life place he had visited was most similar to the paradise of Shangri-La, Hilton said that the town of Weaverville, California came closest.

== Places and media named after Shangri-la ==
In 1942, U.S. President Franklin Roosevelt named his holiday retreat Shangri-La, inspired by the mythical place; it was renamed as Camp David in 1953 by President Eisenhower.

Shangri-La Stone Village is also a unique, free-to-visit roadside attraction in Prospect Hill, North Carolina, featuring a miniature village of 27 stone buildings, each about five feet tall. Created by retired tobacco farmer Henry Warren starting in 1968, the village includes structures like a school, church, and theater, built with local stone, concrete, and thousands of arrowheads. Visitors are welcome to explore the village at any time, and it is customary to leave a small toy or trinket to join the village's "inhabitants".

On 17 December 2001, Zhongdian (Gyalthang), the capital of Diqing Tibetan Autonomous Prefecture, was renamed Shangri-La (Chinese: 香格里拉; pinyin: Xiānggélǐlā). This renaming, along with the county's upgrade to a county-level city on 16 December 2014, was part of an effort by the Chinese government to promote tourism in the area.

The Japanese web novel series Shangri-La Frontier takes its name from Hilton's Shangri-La. When looking for a suitable term to describe the paradise-like world of the game, the author ended up with two choices: "Shangri-La" and "Eldorado". He chose the former after looking at the Wikipedia article because in Hilton's novel it refers to a lamasery where wisdom is collected, which connected to the existence of a glorious scientific civilization in the world of Shangri-La Frontier.

== Searches and documentaries ==
The American explorers Ted Vaill and Peter Klika visited the Muli area of southern Sichuan Province in 1999, and claimed that the Muli monastery in this remote region was the model for Hilton's Shangri-La, which they thought Hilton learned about from articles on this area in several National Geographic magazines in the late 1920s and early 1930s written by the Austrian-American explorer Joseph Rock. Vaill completed a film based on their research, Finding Shangri-La, which debuted at the Cannes Film Festival in 2007. However, Michael McRae unearthed an obscure interview of Hilton from a New York Times gossip column in which he reveals that his cultural inspiration for Shangri-La, if it is anywhere, is more than 250 km north of Muli on the route travelled by Huc and Gabet.

Between 2002 and 2004 a series of expeditions were led by the author and filmmaker Laurence Brahm in western China which determined that the Shangri-La mythical location in Hilton's book Lost Horizon was based on references to the southern Yunnan Province from articles published by National Geographic's first resident explorer, Joseph Rock.

On 2 December 2010, OPB televised one of Martin Yan's Hidden China episodes, "Life in Shangri-La", in which Yan said that "Shangri-La" is the actual name of a real town in the hilly and mountainous region in southwestern Yunnan Province, frequented by both Han and Tibetan locals. Martin Yan visited arts and craft shops and local farmers as they harvested crops, and sampled their cuisine. However, this town was not originally named Shangri-La, but was renamed so in 2001 to increase tourism.

In the "Shangri-La" episode of the BBC documentary series In Search of Myths and Heroes, the television presenter and historian Michael Wood suggested that the legendary Shangri-La might be the abandoned city of Tsaparang, and that its two great temples were once home to the kings of Guge in modern Tibet.

The Travel Channel in 2016 aired two episodes of Expedition Unknown that followed host Josh Gates to Lo Manthang, Nepal and its surrounding areas, including the sky caves found there, in search of Shangri-La. His findings offer no proof that Shangri-La is or was real.

== See also ==
- Himavanta
- List of mythological places
- Pure Land
- Sagala, capital of the Indo-Greek Kingdom
- Shambhala

== Sources ==
- Allen, Charles. (1999). The Search for Shangri-La: A Journey into Tibetan History. Little, Brown and Company (UK). ISBN 0-316-64810-8. Reprinted by Abacus, London. 2000. ISBN 0-349-11142-1.
- Reinhard, Johan (1978) Khembalung: The Hidden Valley. Kailash, A Journal of Himalayan Studies 6(1): 5–35, Kathmandu. PDF
- Wood, Michael (2005) Michael Wood: In search of Myths and Heroes: Shangri-La PBS Educational Broadcasting Company
