= Buddhist vegetarianism =

Vegetarianism in Buddhist culture and philosophy

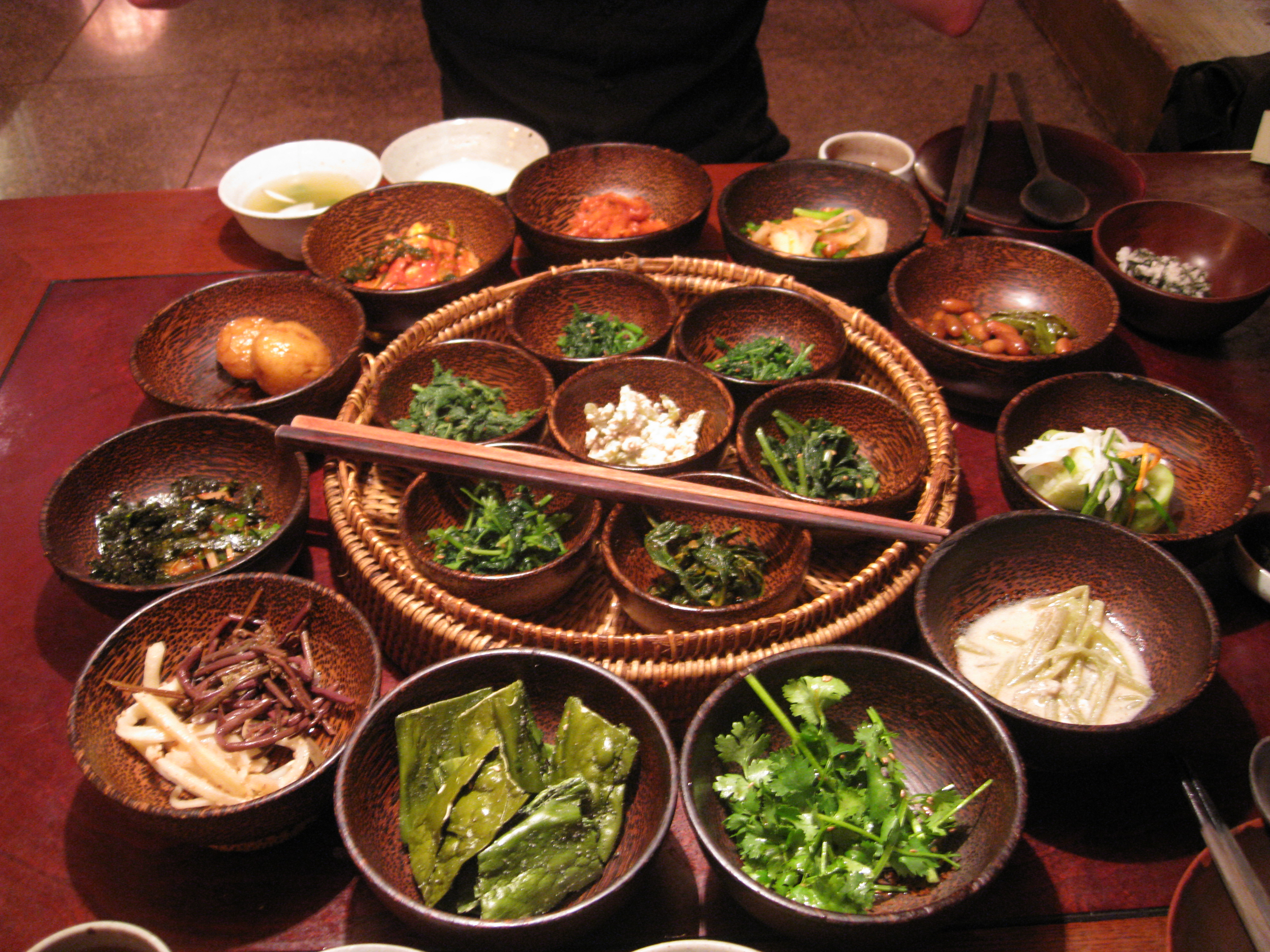
A vegetarian dinner at a Korean Buddhist restaurant

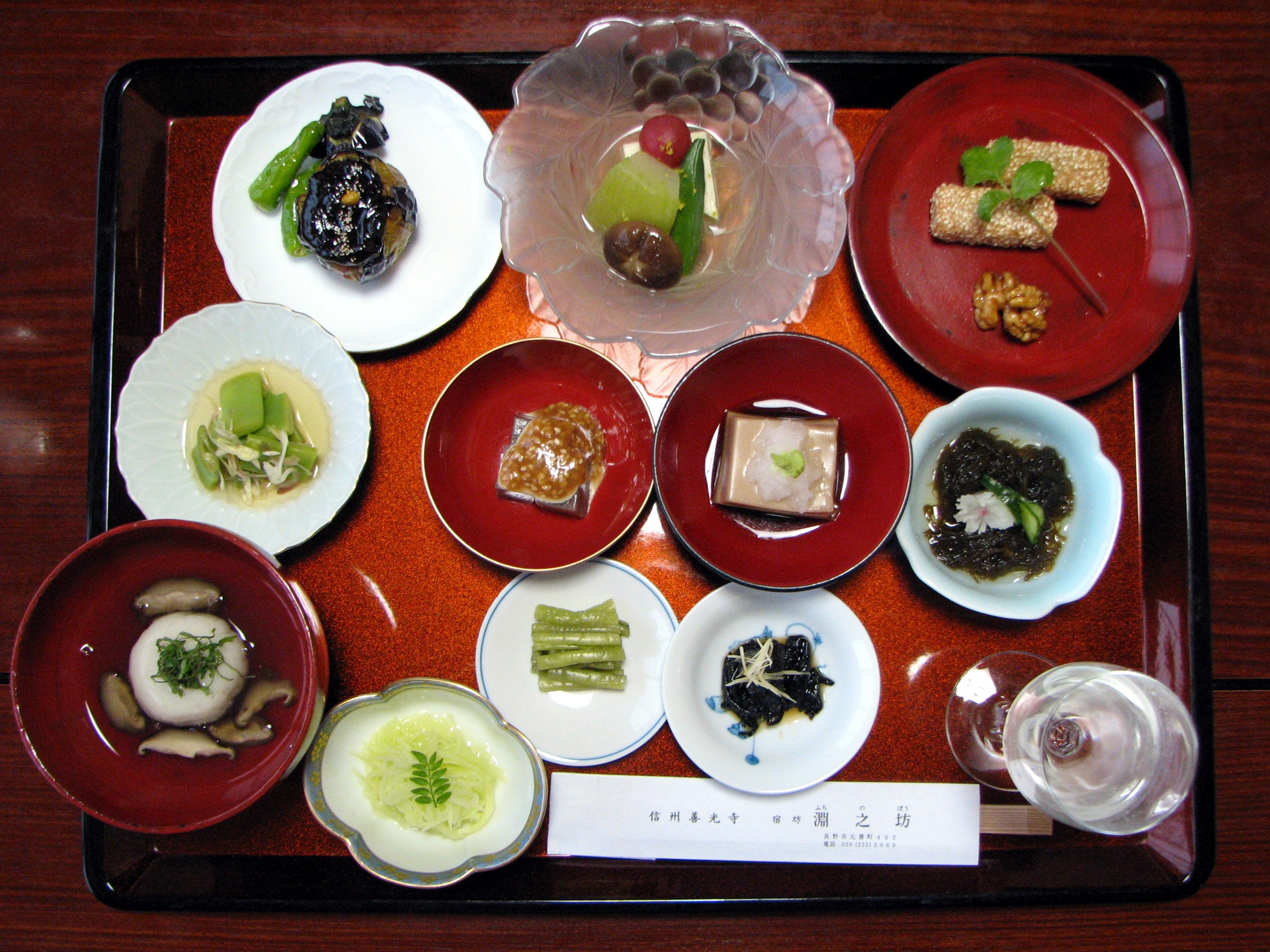
A vegetarian dinner at a Japanese Buddhist restaurant

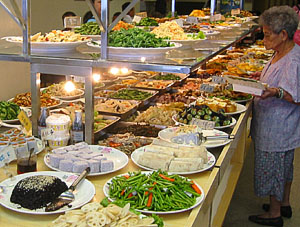
A vegetarian dinner at a Taiwanese Buddhist restaurant

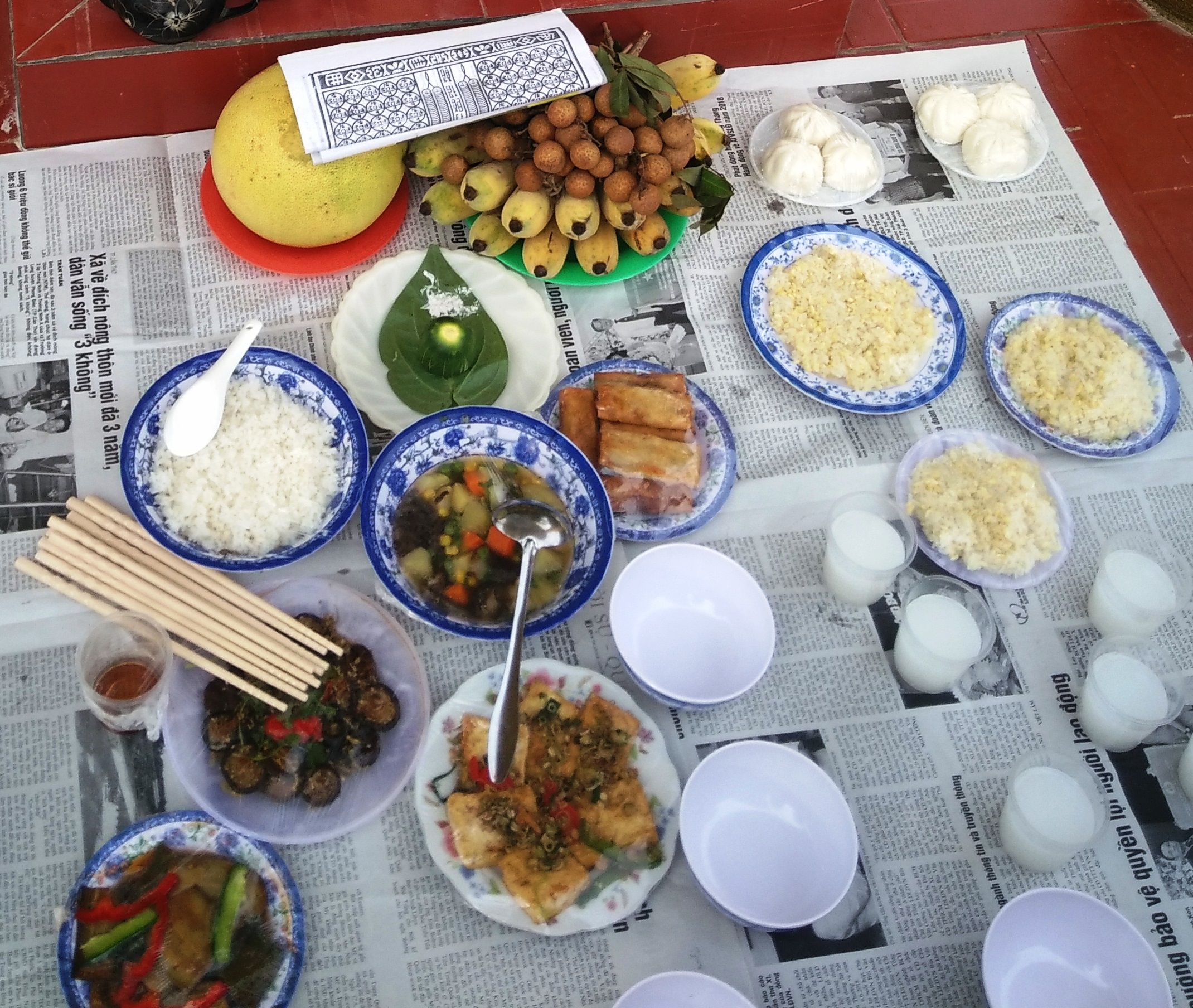
A vegetarian lunch after the new grave worshiping ceremony of a Vietnamese Buddhist family

Buddhist vegetarianism is the practice of vegetarianism by significant portions of Mahāyāna Buddhist monastics and laypersons as well as some Buddhists of other traditions. In Buddhism, the views on vegetarianism vary between different schools of thought. The Mahāyāna schools generally recommend a vegetarian diet, claiming that Gautama Buddha set forth in some of the sutras that his followers must not eat the flesh of any sentient being.

== Early Buddhism ==
The earliest surviving written accounts of Buddhism are the Edicts written by King Ashoka, a well-known Buddhist king who propagated Buddhism throughout Asia, and is honored by both Theravāda and Mahāyāna schools of Buddhism. The authority of the Edicts of Ashoka as a historical record is suggested by the mention of numerous topics omitted as well as corroboration of numerous accounts found in the Theravāda and Mahāyāna Tripitakas written down centuries later.

Asoka Rock Edict 1, dated to c. 257 BCE, mentions the prohibition of animal sacrifices in Ashoka's Maurya Empire as well as his commitment to vegetarianism; however, whether the Sangha was vegetarian in part or in whole is unclear from these edicts. However, Ashoka's personal commitment to, and advocating of, vegetarianism suggests Early Buddhism (at the very least for the layperson) most likely already had a vegetarian tradition (the details of what that entailed besides not killing animals and eating their flesh were not mentioned, and therefore are unknown). According to Schmithausen, however, the consumption of meat was considered acceptable in mainstream Indian Buddhism.

== Views of the three Buddhist vehicles ==
There is a divergence of views within Buddhism as to whether vegetarianism is required; with some schools of Buddhism rejecting such a requirement. Some Buddhists avoid meat consumption because of the first precept in Buddhism: "I undertake the precept to refrain from taking life". Other Buddhists disagree with this conclusion. Many Buddhist vegetarians also oppose meat-eating based on scriptural injunctions against flesh-eating recorded in Mahayana sutras.

=== Theravāda view ===
Vegetarianism in ancient India
Throughout the whole country the people do not kill any living creature, nor drink intoxicating liquor, nor eat onions or garlic. The only exception is that of the Chandalas. That is the name for those who are (held to be) wicked men, and live apart from others. ... In that country they do not keep pigs and fowls, and do not sell live cattle; in the markets there are no butchers’ shops and no dealers in intoxicating drink. In buying and selling commodities they use cowries. Only the Chandalas are fishermen and hunters, and sell flesh meat.

— Faxian, Chinese pilgrim to India (4th/5th century CE), A Record of Buddhistic Kingdoms (translated by James Legge)

The most clear reference in Theravāda Buddhism to monastic consumption of non-vegetarian food is found in the Pali Canon, where the Buddha once explicitly refused a suggestion by Devadatta to mandate vegetarianism in the monks' Vinaya monastic code. This refusal to proscribe non-vegetarian food is within the context of Buddhist monastics receiving alms food.

The Buddha in the Aṅguttara Nikāya 3.38 Sukhamala Sutta, before his enlightenment, describes his family being wealthy enough to provide non-vegetarian meals even to his servants. After becoming enlightened, he respectfully accepted any kind of alms food offered with good intention, including meat (within the limitations described above), fruits and vegetables.

In the same text, a former Jaina converted into Buddhism, Siha, gives alms including meat to the Buddha and his monks, ordering one of his servants to buy fresh meat from the market. Other Jain ascetics comment unfavorably, accusing Siha of killing an animal explicitly for the consumption of the Buddha, but Siha denies such a thing.

In the modern era, the passage cited below has been interpreted as allowing the consumption of meat if it is not specifically slaughtered for the monastic receiving alms food:

… meat should not be eaten under three circumstances: when it is seen or heard or suspected (that a living being has been purposely slaughtered for the eater); these, Jivaka, are the three circumstances in which meat should not be eaten, Jivaka! I declare there are three circumstances in which meat can be eaten: when it is not seen or heard or suspected (that a living being has been purposely slaughtered for the eater); Jivaka, I say these are the three circumstances in which meat can be eaten. —Jivaka Sutta, MN 55 , unpublished translation by Sister Uppalavanna

Also in the Jivaka Sutta, Buddha instructs a monk or nun to accept, without any discrimination, whatever alms food is offered with good will, including meat. As for Buddhist laity, the Buddha in the Vanijja Sutta, AN 5:177 instructed the meat trade to be one of the five wrong livelihood a layperson should not engage in :

Monks, a lay follower should not engage in five types of business. Which five? Business in weapons, business in human beings, business in meat, business in intoxicants, and business in poison. These are the five types of business that a lay follower should not engage in.

But this is not, strictly speaking, a dietary rule because the Buddha, on one particular occasion, specifically refused suggestions by Devadatta to institute vegetarianism in the Sangha.

In the Amagandha Sutta in the Sutta Nipata, a vegetarian Brahmin confronts Kassapa Buddha (a previous Buddha before Gautama Buddha) in regard to the evils of eating meat. The Brahmin insisted his higher status is well-deserved due to his observance of a vegetarian diet. The Buddha countered the argument by listing acts which cause real moral defilement (i.e. those acts in opposition to Buddhist ethics) and then stating the mere consumption of meat is not equivalent to those acts.

There were monastic guidelines prohibiting consumption of 10 types of meat: that of humans, elephants, horses, dogs, snakes, lions, tigers, leopards, bears and hyenas. This is because these animals (allegedly) can be provoked by the smell of the flesh of their own kind, or because eating of such flesh would generate a bad reputation for the Sangha.

Paul Breiter, a student of Ajahn Chah, states that some bhikkhus in the Thai Forest Tradition choose to be vegetarian and that Ajahn Sumedho encouraged supporters to prepare vegetarian food for the temple. In Sri Lanka, vegetarianism is more common among lay Buddhists than among monastics, with lay donors increasingly offering vegetarian food to monastics.

=== Mahāyāna view ===
Mahāyāna views on vegetarianism are within the broader framework of Buddhist ethics or Śīla. The aim of Buddhist vegetarianism is to give rise to compassion and the upholder of vegetarianism is expected to (at least faithfully attempt to) observe Buddhist ethics. The Buddhist vegetarian who does not observe Buddhist ethics is not seen as a true Buddhist vegetarian.

According to the Mahāyāna Mahāparinirvāṇa Sūtra, a Mahayana sutra giving Gautama Buddha's final teachings, the Buddha insisted that his followers should not eat any kind of meat or fish. Even vegetarian food that has been touched by meat should be washed before being eaten. Also, it is not permissible for the monk or nun just to pick out the non-meat portions of a diet – the whole meal must be rejected.

The Aṅgulimālīya Sūtra quotes a dialogue between Gautama Buddha and Manjushri on meat eating:

Mañjuśrī asked, "Do Buddhas not eat meat because of the tathāgata-garbha?"

The Blessed One replied, "Mañjuśrī, that is so. There are no beings who have not been one’s mother, who have not been one’s sister through generations of wandering in beginningless and endless saṃsāra. Even one who is a dog has been one’s father, for the world of living beings is like a dancer. Therefore, one's own flesh and the flesh of another are a single flesh, so Buddhas do not eat meat.

"Moreover, Mañjuśrī, the dhātu of all beings is the dharmadhātu, so Buddhas do not eat meat because they would be eating the flesh of one single dhātu."

The Buddha in certain Mahayana sutras very vigorously and unreservedly denounced the eating of meat, mainly on the grounds that such an act is linked to the spreading of fear amongst sentient beings (who can allegedly sense the odor of death that lingers about the meat-eater and who consequently fear for their own lives) and violates the bodhisattva's fundamental cultivation of compassion. Moreover, according to the Buddha in the Aṅgulimālīya Sūtra, since all beings share the same "Dhatu" (spiritual Principle or Essence) and are intimately related to one another, killing and eating other sentient creatures is tantamount to a form of self-killing and cannibalism. The sutras which inveigh against meat-eating include the Mahāyāna Mahāparinirvāṇa Sūtra, the Śūraṅgama Sūtra, the Brahmajāla Sūtra, the Aṅgulimālīya Sūtra, the Mahamegha Sutra, and the Laṅkāvatāra Sūtra.

In the Mahāyāna Mahāparinirvāṇa Sūtra, which presents itself as the final elucidatory and definitive Mahayana teachings of the Buddha on the very eve of his death, the Buddha states that "the eating of meat extinguishes the seed of Great Kindness", adding that all and every kind of meat and fish consumption (even of animals found already dead) is prohibited by him. He specifically rejects the idea that monks who go out begging and receive meat from a donor should eat it: "[I]t should be rejected... I say that even meat, fish, game, dried hooves and scraps of meat left over by others constitutes an infraction... I teach the harm arising from meat-eating." The Buddha also predicts in this sutra that later monks will "hold spurious writings to be the authentic Dharma" and will concoct their own sutras and falsely claim that the Buddha allows the eating of meat, whereas he says he does not. A long passage in the Laṅkāvatāra Sūtra shows the Buddha speaking out very forcefully against meat consumption and unequivocally in favor of vegetarianism, since the eating of the flesh of fellow sentient beings is said by him to be incompatible with the compassion that a Bodhisattva should strive to cultivate. This passage has been seen as questionable by a small minority of Mahayana Buddhist writers (eg. D.T. Suzuki).

In several other Mahayana scriptures, too (e.g., the Mahayana jataka tales), the Buddha is seen clearly to indicate that meat-eating is undesirable and karmically unwholesome.

Some suggest that the rise of monasteries in Mahayana tradition to be a contributing factor in the emphasis on vegetarianism. In the monastery, food was prepared specifically for monastics. In this context, large quantities of meat would have been specifically prepared (killed) for them. Henceforth, when monastics from the Indian geographical sphere of influence migrated to China from the year 65 CE on, they met followers who provided them with money instead of food. From those days onwards, Chinese monastics, and others who came to inhabit northern countries, cultivated their own vegetable plots and bought food in the market. This remains the dominant practice in China, Vietnam, and most Korean Mahayana temples; the exceptions being some Korean Mahayana temples who traced their lineages back to Japan.

Mahayana lay Buddhists often eat vegetarian diets on the vegetarian dates Zhai qi (Chinese: 齋期; pinyin: Zhāi qí). There are different arrangement of the dates, from several days to three months in each year, in some traditions, the celebration of the bodhisattva Avalokiteśvara's birthday, Bodhi Day and Great Renunciation days hold the highest importance to be vegetarian.

=== Vajrayāna view ===
Some Vajrayāna practitioners both drink alcohol and eat meat. Many traditions of the Ganachakra which is a type of Panchamakara puja prescribed the offering and ingestion of meat and alcohol, although this practice is now often only a symbolic one, with no actual meat or alcohol ingested.

One of the most important tertöns of Tibet, Jigme Lingpa, wrote of his great compassion for animals:

Of all his merit-making, Jigme Lingpa was most proud of his feelings of compassion for animals; he says that this is the best part of his entire life story. He writes of his sorrow when he witnessed the butchering of animals by humans. He often bought and set free animals about to be slaughtered (a common Buddhist act). He ‘changed the perception’ of others, when he once caused his followers to save a female yak from being butchered, and he continually urged his disciples to forswear the killing of animals.

In The Life of Shabkar, the Autobiography of a Tibetan Yogin, Shabkar Tsokdruk Rangdrol wrote:

Above all, you must constantly train your mind to be loving, compassionate, and filled with Bodhicitta. You must give up eating meat, for it is very wrong to eat the flesh of our parent sentient beings.

The 14th Dalai Lama and other esteemed lamas invite their audiences to adopt vegetarianism when they can. When asked in recent years what he thinks of vegetarianism, the 14th Dalai Lama has said: "It is wonderful. We must absolutely promote vegetarianism." The Dalai Lama tried becoming a vegetarian and promoted vegetarianism. In 1999, it was published that the Dalai Lama would only be vegetarian every other day and partakes of meat regularly. When he is in Dharamsala, he is vegetarian, but not necessarily when he is outside Dharamsala. Paul McCartney has taken him to task for this and wrote to him to urge him to return to strict vegetarianism, but "[The Dalai Lama] replied [to me] saying that his doctors had told him he needed [meat], so I wrote back saying they were wrong."

Tenzin Wangyal Rinpoche became vegetarian in 2008.

Arjia Rinpoche became vegetarian in 1999.

On 3 January 2007, one of the two 17th Karmapa, Urgyen Trinley Dorje, strongly urged vegetarianism upon his students, saying that generally, in his view, it was very important in the Mahayana not to eat meat and that even in Vajrayana students should not eat meat:

There are many great masters and very great realized beings in India and there have been many great realized beings in Tibet also, but they are not saying, "I'm realized, therefore I can do anything; I can eat meat and drink alcohol." It's nothing like that. It should not be like that.

According to the Kagyupa school, we have to see what the great masters of the past, the past lamas of Kagyupas, did and said about eating meat. The Drikung Shakpa [sp?] Rinpoche, master of Drikungpa, said like this, "My students, whomever are eating or using meat and calling it tsokhor or tsok, then these people are completely deserting me and going against the dharma." I can't explain each of these things, but he said that anybody that is using meat and saying it is something good, this is completely against the dharma and against me and they completely have nothing to do with dharma. He said it very, very strongly.

== Common practices ==
=== Theravāda ===
In the modern world, attitudes toward vegetarianism vary by location. In Sri Lanka and the Theravada countries of South East Asia, monks are obliged by the monastic code, Vinaya to accept almost any food that is offered to them, including meat, unless they suspect the meat was slaughtered specifically for them. Theravādin monks are also not supposed to choose or request for any specific food during their pindapata (alms collection).

=== Chinese, Korean, Vietnamese, and Taiwanese traditions ===
In China, Korea, Vietnam, Taiwan and their respective diaspora communities, monks and nuns are expected to abstain from meat and, traditionally, eggs and dairy, in addition to the fetid vegetables; also known as the five pungent spices (Chinese: 五辛; pinyin: Wǔ xīn) – traditionally garlic, Allium chinense, asafoetida, shallot, and Allium victorialis (victory onion or mountain leek), although in modern times this rule is often interpreted to include other vegetables of the onion genus, as well as coriander – this is called pure vegetarianism or veganism (Chinese: 純素/淨素齋; pinyin: Chún sù/Jìng sù/Zhāi) and or five pungent spices vegetarianism (Chinese: 五辛素; pinyin: Wǔ xīn sù).

Pure Vegetarianism or Veganism is Indic in origin and is still practiced in India by some adherents of Dharmic religions such as Jainism and in the case of Hinduism, lacto-vegetarianism with the additional abstention of pungent or fetid vegetables.

A minority of Buddhist lay believers are year-long or life-long vegetarians. Many lay followers typically adhere to monastic-style vegetarianism on Lunar New Year Eve, commemorative holidays and ancestral feast days, as well as the first and fifteenth days of each month on the lunar calendar. Some lay followers also follow monastic-style vegetarianism on the six-day (Chinese: 六日齋; pinyin: Liù rì zhāi), ten-day (Chinese: 十日齋; pinyin: Shí rì zhāi), Guan-yin (Avalokiteśvara) vegetarian (Chinese: 觀音齋; pinyin: Guānyīn zhāi) etc., and follow according to that lunar calendar schedule. Other Buddhist lay-followers also follow less stringent forms of vegetarianism. Most Buddhist lay-followers however are not vegetarians. Some Zhaijiao lay adherents also do not eat any meat.

=== Japanese traditions ===
Japan initially received Chinese Buddhism in the 6th century. In 675, Emperor Tenmu issued an edict prohibiting eating the meat of cows, horses, dogs, monkeys, and roosters, as recorded in the Nihon Shoki. Tenmu was a strong proponent of Buddhism, and these views were bolstered by Shinto perspectives that reviewed blood and dead bodies as impure (Japanese: 穢れ kegare) and to be avoided. Despite this, animal products remained in the Japanese diet long after the 675 edict. References to hunting and eating deer and wild boar continued throughout the ancient and medieval period into the 16th century as an occasional part of the diet for all but those in the poorer agrarian classes. The court nobles also ate red meat occasionally, despite being obliged to follow Buddhist principles closely, although it was viewed as inferior to eating fish and birds.

Around the 9th century, two Japanese monks (Kūkai and Saichō), introduced Vajrayana Buddhism into Japan, and this soon became the dominant Buddhism among the nobility. In particular, Saichō, who founded the Tendai sect of Japanese Buddhism, reduced the number of vinaya code to 66. (円戒 yuán jiè) During the 12th century, a number of monks from Tendai sects founded new schools (Zen, Pure Land Buddhism) and de-emphasised vegetarianism. Nichiren Buddhism today likewise deemphasises vegetarianism. Zen does tend generally to look favourably upon vegetarianism. Shingon Buddhism, founded by Kūkai, recommends vegetarianism and requires it at certain times, but it is not always strictly required for monks and nuns. Buddhist vegetarianism (aka Shojin Ryori), also dictates Kinkunshoku (禁葷食) which is to not use meat as well as Gokun (五葷 5 vegetables from the allium family) in their cooking.

In 1872 of the Meiji restoration, as part of the opening up of Japan to Western influence, Emperor Meiji lifted the ban on the consumption of red meat. The removal of the ban encountered resistance and in one notable response, ten monks attempted to break into the Imperial Palace. The monks asserted that due to foreign influence, large numbers of Japanese had begun eating meat and that this was "destroying the soul of the Japanese people." Several of the monks were killed during the break-in attempt, and the remainder were arrested.

=== Tibetan traditions ===
The practice of non-harming forms the basis of all three vehicles of Buddhist philosophy. For this reason, the Buddha gave advice to the Buddhist community of monastics in the Vinaya concerning food and the consumption of meat, since monastics traditionally relied upon alms given to them by the local community for sustenance on occasions which may include meat, and to refuse such offerings could be considered as going against their vows. The Buddha made clear distinctions between eating meat and killing, by giving instructions on the three-fold purity of meat.

In Tibet, where vegetables are scarce, meat is often consumed as a form of sustenance. However, records show that in Tibet, the practice of vegetarianism was encouraged as early as the 14th and 15th centuries by renowned Buddhist teachers such as Chödrak Gyatso and Mikyö Dorje, 8th Karmapa Lama.

Contemporary Buddhist teachers such as the Dalai Lama, and The 17th Karmapa Ogyen Trinley Dorje, invite their audiences to adopt vegetarianism whenever they can. Chatral Rinpoche in particular stated that anyone who wished to be his student must be vegetarian.

== See also ==
- Ahimsa
- Buddhist cuisine
- Buddhist ethics
- Upaya
- Aṅgulimāla
- Vegetarian cuisine
- Vegetarianism and religion
