= Kumbum Monastery =

Tibetan monastery in Lusar, Qinghai, China

- Tibetan transcription(s); Tibetan: སྐུ་འབུམ་བྱམས་པ་གླིང་། Wylie transliteration: sku 'bum byams pa gling Chinese transcription(s); Simplified: 塔尔寺; Pinyin: Tǎ'ěrsì
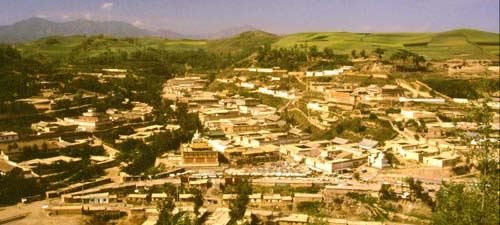
- Kumbum Monastery

- Location of Kumbum Monastery Kumbum Monastery (China)

Religion
- Affiliation: Tibetan Buddhism
- Sect: Gelug
- Deity: Je Tsongkhapa

Location
- Location: Huangzhong County, Xining, Qinghai
- Country: China
- Coordinates: 36°28′53.18″N 101°35′57.09″E

Architecture
- Founder: 3rd Dalai Lama
- Established: 1582; 444 years ago

Kumbum Monastery (Tibetan: སྐུ་འབུམ་བྱམས་པ་གླིང་, THL Kumbum Jampa Ling), also called Ta'er Temple, is a Tibetan gompa in Lusar, Xining, Qinghai, China. It was founded in 1583 in a narrow valley close to the village of Lusar in the historical Tibetan region of Amdo. Its superior monastery is Drepung Monastery, immediately to the west of Lhasa. It is ranked in importance as second only to Lhasa.

== Description ==
Alexandra David-Néel, the famous Belgian-French explorer who spent more than two years studying and translating Tibetan books at the monastery, said of it:

[T]he configuration of the surrounding mountain ranges arrested the passage of the clouds, and forced them to turn around the rocky summit which supported the gompa forming a sea of white mist, with its waves beating silently against the cells of the monks, wreathing the wooded slopes and creating a thousand fanciful landscapes as they rolled by. Terrible hailstorms would often break over the monastery, due, said the country folk, to the malignity of the demons who sought to disturb the peace of the saintly monks.

We were taken first to the great kitchen where priests were brewing Tibetan tea in great copper cauldrons ten feet in diameter, beautifully chased with the Buddhist symbols. The stoves were the usual mud affairs and the fuel nothing but straw, which younger lamas continually fed to the fire."

=== Origins: The Tree of Great Merit ===
Je Tsongkhapa, the founder of the Gelug school of Tibetan Buddhism, was born in nearby Tsongkha in 1357. According to one tradition, Tsongkhapa's father took the afterbirth and buried it where the monastery is now and soon a sandalwood tree grew on the spot. Another version has it that the tree grew up where drops of blood from Tsongkhapa's umbilical cord had fallen on the ground. In any case this tree became known as the "Tree of Great Merit." The leaves and the bark of this tree were reputed to bear impressions of the Buddha's face and various mystic syllables and its blossoms were said to give off a peculiarly pleasing scent.

The four-storied golden-roofed temple built around the tree where Tsongkhapa is said to have been born is called "Golden Tree" (Wylie: gser sdong, metaphorically "wish-fulfilling tree") and is considered the holiest place at Kumbum.

On the porch of the Golden Temple, pilgrims prostrate themselves one hundred times and the boards are worn into grooves where their feet and hands touch. . . . We were taken into one great temple capable of seating twenty-five hundred priests. The great pillars were covered with brilliantly woven rugs, skins of animals, and the bright "pulo" cloth of the Tibetans. It was a mass of brilliant, garish colors and to my mind would have been wonderful in a more subdued light."

This is the origin of its Chinese name, Little Tower Temple.

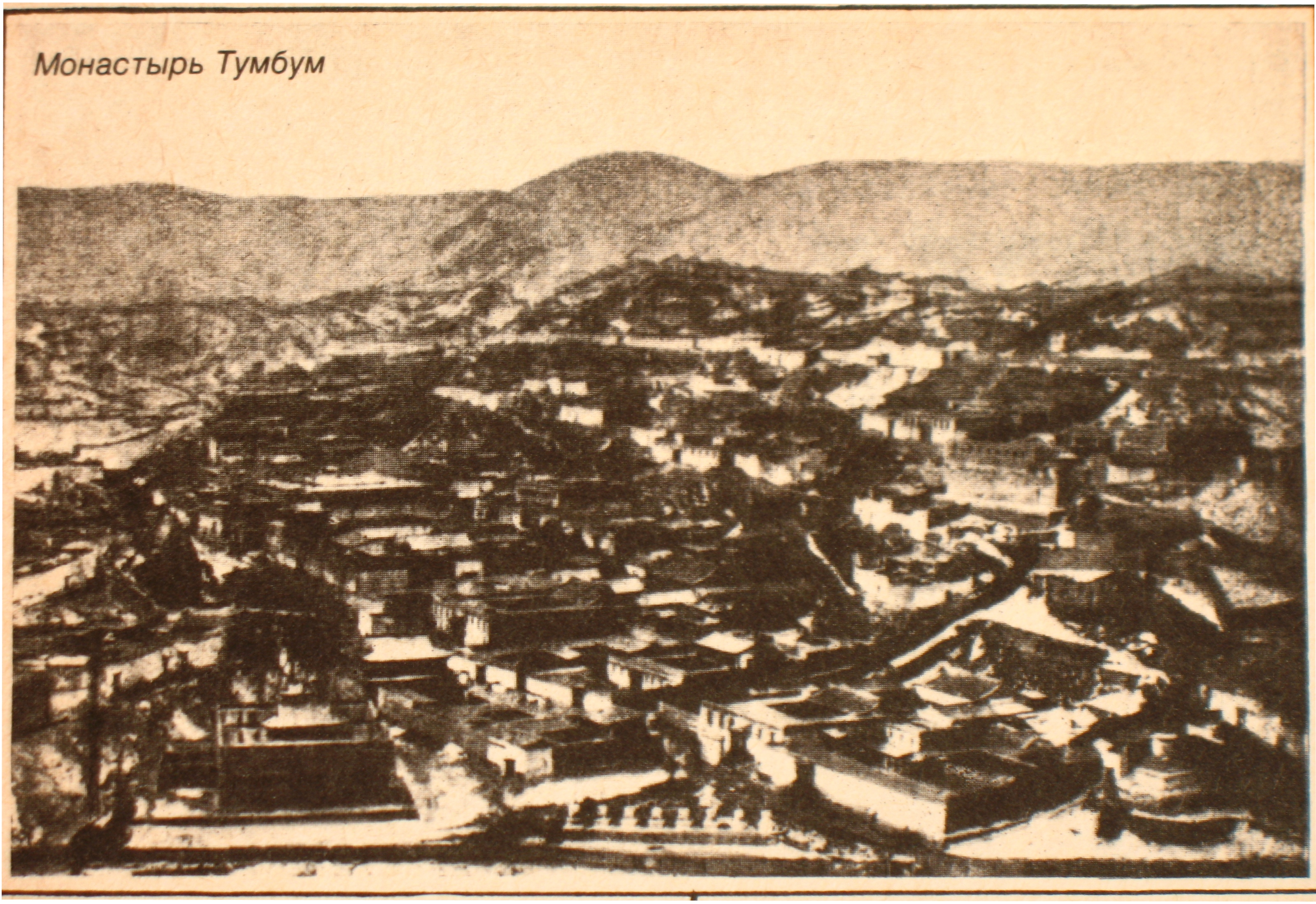
Gombojab Tsybikov took this photo in 1900 of Kumbum Monastery, Amdo, Tibet

Two Catholic missionaries, Évariste Régis Huc and Joseph Gabet who arrived here in the 1840s when the tree was still living were fully prepared to dismiss "The Tree of Great Merit" as just another fanciful legend.

We were filled with an absolute consternation of astonishment," Huc noted in his famous book Travels in Tartary, "at finding that, in point of fact, there were upon each of the leaves well-formed Tibetan characters . . . Our first impression was a suspicion of fraud on the part of the lamas; but after a minute examination of every detail, we could not discover the least deception."

Section of this tree are now preserved in a stupa in the Great Golden Temple.

The "Golden Tiled Temple" is revered throughout Tibet and Mongolia. It is a small building with a roof of pure gold plate. Inside, it is full of wonderful relics, great banners of silk brocade called "khatas", wonderful lamps of gold and silver, thousands of small vessels burning butter, a colossal figure of Tsongkhapa, said to be made of gold. All is in semi-darkness which adds to the mystical effect, and the gleam from the butter lamps threw into relief some beautifully wrought temple vessels, or the queer blank face of some saintly Buddha image."

== History ==
=== Foundation ===
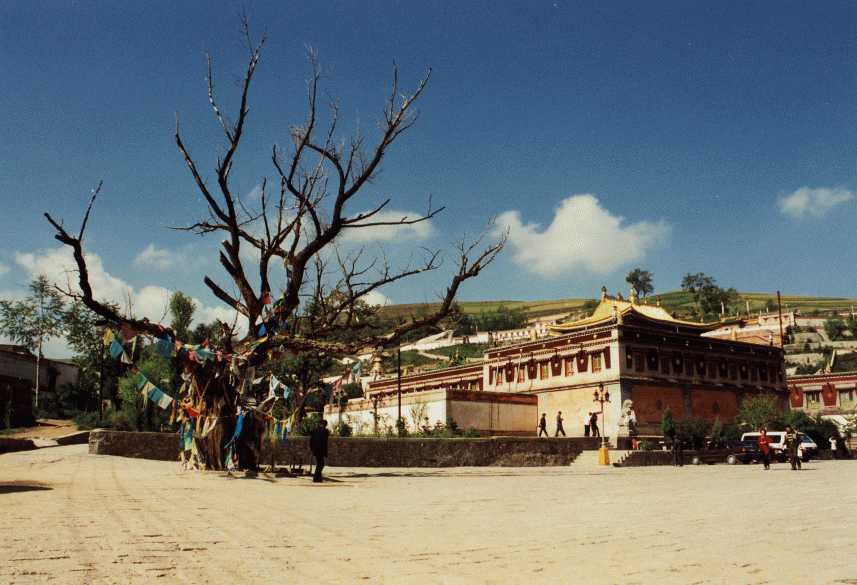
Kumbum Monastery

In the 1360s Tsongkhapa's mother, with the help of locals, had a small temple with a stupa built on the site of his birthplace.

In 1560 the meditator Tsöndrü Gyeltsen (Wylie: brtson 'grus rgyal mtshan) built a small monastery there called Gonpalung for intensive meditation practice. At first, it had seven monks at a time, but soon expanded to hold fifteen.

In 1576, Altan Khan (1507–1583) of the Tümed Mongols invited the future 3rd Dalai Lama, Sönam Gyatso (1543–1588) to bring Buddhism to Mongolia. After Altan Khan adopted Buddhism, he gave Sönam Gyatso the title Dalai Lama: Dalai is the Mongolian translation of the name Gyatso "ocean."

On his way to meet Altan Khan near Qinghai Lake, the 3rd Dalai Lama stopped at the isolated retreat by the holy tree marking the spot where Tsongkhapa had been born. He requested Tsöndrü Gyeltsen to construct a larger monastery at this site and appointed him as the head lama. The monastery was built completely in 1583 and a fence was erected around the "Tree of Great Merit". An annual Monlam Prayer Festival (Wylie: smon lam) was inaugurated, like the one held in Lhasa. The new monastery was called Kumbum Jampa Ling. "Kumbum" means "100,000 enlightening bodies of the Buddha". It is named after the 100,000 images of Siṃhanāda which appear on the leaves of the holy sandalwood tree. "Jampa ling" means "Maitreya Cloister." This refers to the Maitreya temple built by Tsöndrü Gyeltsen to the right of the precious tree.

The first Throne Holder of Kumbum was Düldzin Özer Gyatso (Wylie: 'dul 'dzin 'od zer rgya mtsho, born 1557). In 1603, the 4th Dalai Lama (1589–1616) stopped at Kumbum on his way from his native Mongolia to Ü-Tsang. At that time, he proclaimed the need for a study division to be built and for Düldzin Özer Gyatso to be appointed as the head of the entire monastery. At Kumbum's Monlam of 1612, Düldzin Özer Gyatso first ascended to the throne of abbot and opened a debate college (Wylie: dpal ldan bshad grub gling grwa tshang).

By the middle of the 20th century, Kumbum Monastery included thirty temples and a thousand or so houses.

The Hui General Ma Bufang patronized the Choekyi Gyaltsen, 10th Panchen Lama and the Nyingma against the Dalai Lama. Qinghai served as a "sanctuary" for Nyingma members. Ma Bufang allowed Kumbum Monastery to be totally self-governed by the Panchen Lama.

=== Monastic colleges ===
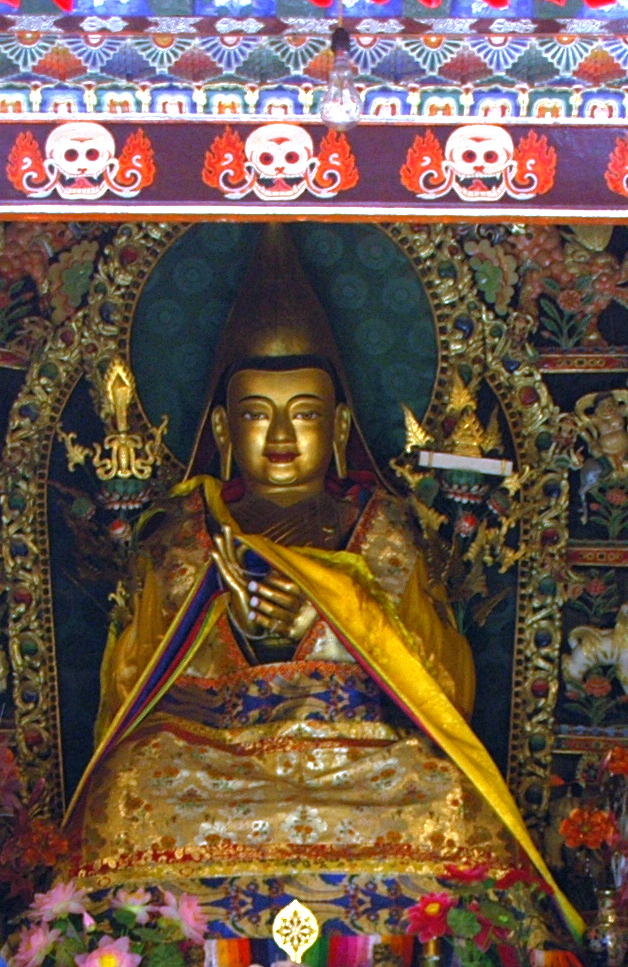
Statue of Je Tsongkhapa at Kumbum Monastery

Kumbum has four monastic colleges or faculties (dratsang). The largest is the Debate College or Faculty for Logic, the Shadupling Dratsang. Most of its divisions use the textbooks of Jetsunpa Choekyi Gyeltsen (1469–1544), as at Ganden Jangtsey and Sera Jey Colleges near Lhasa. A few of the divisions follow the textbooks of Kunkyen Jamyang-Zhaypa-Ngawang-Tsondru (1648–1722), as at Gomang College of Drepung Monastery and Labrang Monastery. The highest degrees of Geshe Rabjampa and Geshe Shayrampa are awarded at the Kumbum Monlam Prayer Festival each year.

Gyüpa Dratsang, the Tantric College, or Sangngag Dechenling Datsang was founded by Chojey Legpa Gyatso in 1649. The curriculum follows that of Gyumay Lower Tantric College of Lhasa. After study of the major texts and commentaries of the Guhyasamāja tantra, Cakrasaṃvara Tantra (Wylie: bde mchog) and Vajrabhairava tantra, monks receive the geshe ngagrampa degree.

In 1711, Chuzang Lozang-Tenpai-Gyeltsen built a new Tantric College, Ngagpa Dratsang. In 1723, the Qing armies severely damaged the four great monasteries of the Qinghai region – Kumbum, Gonlung, Serkog and Chuzang and many monks fled. Soon afterwards, the Qing commander asked the 21st Throne Holder to convert the new Ngagpa Dratsang into a Medical College, and this was done. With the appointment of several famous doctors, the Medical College, Menpa Dratsang Sorig-Dargey-Zhenphen-Norbuling was opened in 1725. It became a separate college during the time of the 22nd Throne Holder. The doctors who are graduated receive the Menrampa degree.

The fourth college at Kumbum is the Kalachakra College, Dükhor Dratsang or Dukor Dratsang Rigden Losel ling. It was founded in 1820 by Ngawang Shedrub Tenpé Nyima. Monks at this college also study astrology and receive the tsirampa degree upon completion of their education.

== Current situation ==
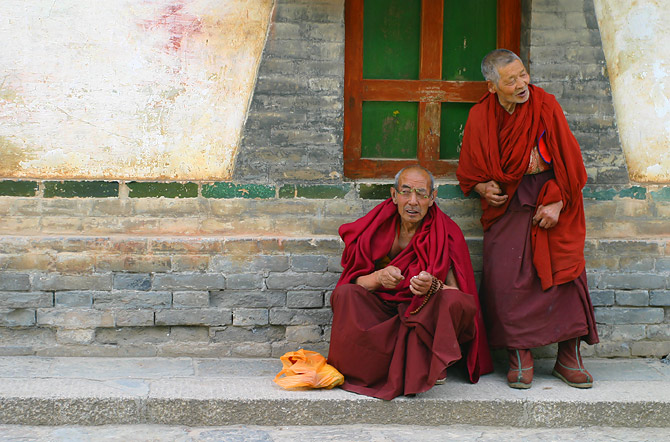
Bhikṣus at Kumbum Monastery

Before 1958, Kumbum had 3600 monks. At present, there are 400, as the monastery was affected by Chinese Communist policies since the late 1950s. Of these, 300 are at the Debate College and the rest are distributed evenly among the other three colleges. Traditionally, the majority of the Kumbum monks have been Tibetans from Amdo, as at Labrang Monastery. The remainder have been Khalkha Mongols from Mongolia (Wylie: phyi sog) or Inner Mongolia (Wylie: smad sog, nang-sog), Upper Mongols (Wylie: stod sog) from Amdo east of Kumbum or Yugurs (Wylie: yu gur) from Gansu.

Kumbum is still a major pilgrimage for Vajrayana believers and scholars, visited by many thousands of people a year. The Arjia tulkus are traditionally given the position of abbot of Kumbum. The 8th Arjia Rinpoche went into exile in the United States in 1998. He is currently developing an exile campus of Kumbum Monastery in Bloomington, Indiana, known as Kumbum Chamtse Ling or Kumbum West.

The Kumbum monastery is still a repository of Tibetan culture and art, including various sculptures, statues and religious artifacts. Western visitors such as David-Néel, Paul Pelliot, Ella Maillart, Peter Fleming, Evariste Huc, André Migot) have spent time there.
