= Dharmadhatu =

Buddhist concept which signifies "all phenomena" in the entire universe taken as a whole

Dharmadhatu (Sanskrit: धर्मधातु, romanized: Dharmadhātu, lit. 'Realm of Ultimate Reality'; Tibetan: ཆོས་ཀྱི་དབྱིངས་, Wylie: Chos kyi dbying, THL: Chökyi Ying; Chinese: 法界) is the 'dimension', 'realm' or 'sphere' (dhātu) of the Dharma or Absolute Reality. Entire Dharmadhatu was filled with an infinite number of buddha-lands (Sanskrit: buddhakṣetra) with ineffable number of Buddhas. This realm is beyond of everything, and it is visible only to Buddhas and all other Bodhisattvas in existence.

== Definition ==
In Mahayana Buddhism, dharmadhatu means "realm of all phenomena", "realm of all things" (the entire universe with all visible and invisible things) or "realm of eternal truth". It is referred to by several analogous terms from Mahayana Buddhist philosophy, such as tathātā (reality "as-it-is"), śūnyatā (emptiness), pratitya-samutpada (dependent co-arising) and eternal Buddha. It is the "deepest nature, or essence".

Dharmadhatu is the purified mind in its natural state, free of obscurations. It is the essence-quality or primal nature of mind, the fundamental ground of consciousness of the trikaya, which is accessed via the mindstream.

When the buddha-nature has been realised, dharmadhatu is also referred to as the Dharmakāya, the Body of Dharma Truth.

It is associated with supreme cosmic buddha Vairocana.

== Historical origin ==
Kang-nam Oh traces the origin of dharmadhatu to the Avatamsaka Sutra. It has been further developed by the Hua-yen school:

This idea of dharmadhatu-pratītyasamutpāda which was originally found in the Avataṁsaka-sūtra or Hua-yen ching, (Note: There are three Chinese translations in the name of Ta-fang-kuang-fo hua-yen-ching. 1) T.9, no. 278, tr. by Buddhabhadra in sixty fascicles during 418-420; 2) T.10, no. 279, by Śiksānanda in eighty fascicles during 695-699; and 3) T.10, no. 293, by Prajñā in forty fascicles during 795-798. The last one is basically equivalent to the last chapter of the previous versions, i.e., the Chapter on Entering into Dharmadhatu. This chapter is available in Sanskrit as an independent sutra called Gaṇdavyuha-sūtra, one ed. by D. T.Suzuki and H. Idzumi (Kyoto: The Sanskrit Buddhist Texts Publishing Society, 1934-36), and the other ed. by P. L. Vaidya, Buddhist Sanskrit Texts, no. 5 (Darbhanga: The Mithila Institute of Post Graduate Studies and Research in Sanskrit Learning, 1960).) was fully developed by the Hua-yen school into a systematic doctrine palatable to the Chinese intellectual taste. The dharmadhatu doctrine (Note: To be exact, it should be called the “dharmadhātu-pratītyasamutpāda” doctrine. But for the sake of convenience, it will be referred to as dharmadhatu doctrine hereafter.) can be said to have been, by and large, set forth by Tu-shun (557~640 C.E.), formulated by Chih-yen (602~668), systematized by Fa-tsang (643~712), and elucidated by Ch’eng-kuan (ca. 737~838) and Tsung-mi (780~841).

== Understanding in Buddhist tradition ==
=== Indian Buddhism ===
==== Śrīmālādevī Sūtra ====
The Śrīmālādevī Sūtra (3rd century CE), also named The Lion's Roar of Queen Srimala, centers on the teaching of the tathagatagarbha as "ultimate soteriological principle". It states that the tathagata-garbha is the "embryo" of the Dharmadhatu and the Dharmakaya:

Lord, the Tathagatagarbha is neither self nor sentient being, nor soul, nor personality. The Tathagatagarbha is not the domain of beings who fall into the belief in a real personality, who adhere to wayward views, whose thoughts are distracted by voidness. Lord, this Tathagatagarbha is the embryo of the Illustrious Dharmadhatu, the embryo of the Dharmakaya, the embryo of the supramundane dharma, the embryo of the intrinsically pure dharma.

In the Śrīmālādevī Sūtra, there are two possible states for the Tathagatagarbha:

[E]ither covered by defilements, when it is called only "embryo of the Tathagata"; or free from defilements, when the "embryo of the Tathagata" is no more the "embryo" (potentiality) but the Tathāgata (=the Dharmakaya)(actuality).

The sutra itself states it this way:

This Dharmakaya of the Tathagata when not free from the store of defilement is referred to as the Tathagatagarbha.

==== Dharmadhātustava ====
The Dharmadhātustava ("In praise of the Dharmadhatu"), attributed to Nāgārjuna though questioned, is a treatise on the dharmadhatu. According to the Dharmadhātustava, the dharmadhatu is the ground which makes liberation possible: (Note: In cooperation with the Indian Khenpo, Krishna Pandita, it was translated (from Sanskrit to Tibetan) by Lotsawa Tsultrim Gyalwa. Based on teachings given by Khenpo Tsultrim Gyamtso Rinpoche, it has been translated from Tibetan into English by Jim Scott, April 1997, and edited by Ari Goldfield, September 1998. Karl Brunholzl published another translation, with extensive commentaries, In Praise of Dharmadhatu (2008).)

The dharmadhatu is the ground
For buddhahood, nirvana, purity, and permanence.

According to the Dharmadhātustava, the dharmadhatu is seen when the afflictions are purified:

As butter, though inherent in the milk,
Is mixed with it and hence does not appear,
Just so the dharmadhatu is not seen
As long as it is mixed together with afflictions.

And just as the inherent butter essence
When the milk is purified is no more disguised,
When afflictions have been completely purified,
The dharmadhatu will be without any stain at all.

=== Chinese Buddhism ===
==== Mahaparinirvana Sutra ====
In the Mahayana Mahaparinirvana Sutra, the Buddha states of himself that he is the "boundless Dharmadhatu" - the totality itself.

=== Tibetan Buddhism ===
==== Five Wisdoms ====
The Dharmadhatu is comprehended by one of the Five Wisdoms:

1. Dharmadhatu wisdom,
2. Mirror-like wisdom,
3. Equality wisdom,
4. Discriminating wisdom,
5. All-accomplishing wisdom.

==== Dzogchen ====
In the Dzogchen text Gold refined from ore, the term Dharmadhatu is translated as "total field of events and meanings" or "field of all events and meanings".

== See also ==
- Dharmakāya – One of the three bodies of a Buddha
- Four Dharmadhātu – Philosophical concept in Chinese Buddhism
- Ground – Primordial state in Tibetan Buddhism
