= Five wisdoms =

Buddhist philosophical concept

The Five Wisdoms (Note: Sanskrit: pañca-jñāna; Tibetan: ཡེ་ཤེས་ལྔ, Wylie: ye shes lnga; Japanese: go-chi) are five kinds of wisdoms which appear when the mind is purified of the five disturbing emotions and the natural mind appears. (Note: Lone Hansen (Shenphen Chödron), The Five Wisdoms) (Note: Anger, jealousy, pride, attachment and ignorance)

All of those five wisdoms are represented by one of the five buddha-families.

The last four these five are also called the "four wisdoms" (四智).

== Meaning and translations ==
Pañca-jñāna is rendered in English as: "five wisdoms," "five awarenesses," or "five pristine cognitions."

== Interpretations ==
The Five Wisdoms are:

1. Tathatā-jñāna, the wisdom of Suchness or Dharmadhatu, "the bare non-conceptualizing awareness" of Śūnyatā, the ultimate wisdom among the other four;
2. Ādarśa-jñāna, the wisdom of "Mirror-like Awareness", "devoid of all dualistic thought and ever united with its 'content' as a mirror is with its reflections"; (Note: Ādarśa is Sanskrit for "mirror", the term may be parsed into the etymon of darśana with a grammatical adposition) This type of wisdom is a transformation of the eighth consciousness, the Alayavijnana.
3. Samatā-jñāna, the wisdom of the "Awareness of Sameness", which perceives the sameness, the commonality of dharmas or phenomena. This kind of wisdom is a transformation of the seventh consciousness, the Klistamanas. Through this wisdom, a Buddha sees beyond all superficial differentiations and perceives the fundamental of all things as Śūnyatā or emptiness. Such undifferentiation gives rise to equality for all beings. Hence, it is also understood as the wisdom of equality or impartiality.
4. Pratyavekṣaṇa-jñāna, the wisdom of "Investigative Awareness", that perceives the specificity, the uniqueness of dharmas. This type of wisdom is a transformation of the sixth consciousness, and is also known as the wisdom of specific knowledge or sublime investigation.
5. Kṛty-anuṣṭhāna-jñāna, the wisdom of "Accomplishing Activities", the awareness that "spontaneously carries out all that has to be done for the welfare of beings, manifesting itself in all directions". This type of wisdom is created through the transformation of the five sensory consciousness.

The Five Wisdoms "emerge through a transformation (parāvṛtti) of the eight consciousnesses at the moment of enlightenment".

== Five Tathāgatas ==
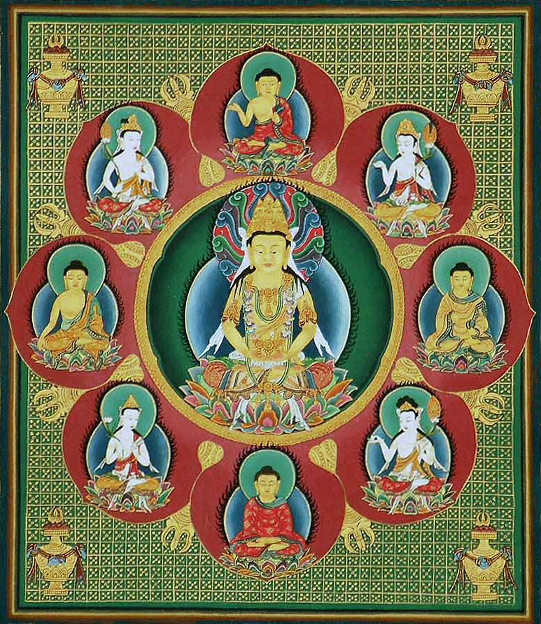
Cloth with painting of the Buddha

The idea of the Five Wisdoms "underwent a considerable development" within Vajrayana Buddhism where they are "symbolized or embodied" in the Five Tathāgatas.

According to Bönpo teacher Tenzin Wangyal, the Five Pure Lights become the Five Poisons if we remain deluded, or the Five Wisdoms and the Five Buddha Families if we recognize their purity.

The Five Wisdoms, and the accompanying Five Buddhas, are represented in Tibetan Buddhism by the "symbolic bone ornaments". (Note: Skt: aṣṭhiamudrā; Tib: rus pa'i rgyan phyag rgya) The Hevajra Tantra associates the Symbolic Bone Ornaments directly with the Five Wisdoms: (Note: These are elucidated by a commentary to the Hevajra Tantra by Jamgön Kongtrul.)

1. the 'wheel-like' (Tib.: 'khor lo') 'crown ornament' (sometimes called 'crown jewel') (Tib.: gtsug gi nor bu), symbolic of Akshobhya and 'mirror-like pristine awareness' (Ādarśa-jñāna);
2. 'earrings' (Tib.: rna cha) represent of Amitabha and pristine awareness of discernment (Pratyavekṣaṇa-jñāna);
3. 'necklace' (Tib.: mgul rgyan) symbolizing Ratnasambhava and pristine awareness of total sameness (Samatā-jñāna);
4. 'bracelets' (Tib.: lag gdu) and 'anklets' (Tib.: gdu bu) as symbolic of Vairochana and pristine awareness of the ultimate dimension of phenomena (Tathatā-jñāna);
5. 'girdle' (Tib.: ske rags) symbolizing Amoghasiddhi and the accomplishing pristine awareness (Kṛty-anuṣṭhāna-jñāna);

The additional ornament spoken of in various texts related to Hevajra is ash from a cremation ground smeared on the body (Tib.: thal chen).

== Chögyam Trungpa ==
The Five Wisdom Energies were used by Tibetan Buddhist master Chögyam Trungpa in America during the 1970s. As interpreted and taught by Trungpa, the Five Buddhas become instead a kind of spiritual and psychological personality typology and diagnostic. Five basic personality types represent core human potentials and each of their underlying Wisdom Energies is associated with a particular ideal way of perceiving and interacting with the world.

Each Energy has a confused (neurotic) side (for example, greed or anger) and an awakened (Wisdom) side in human beings; when the Energies are not purified in the human personality, they manifest instead as neurotic tendencies and negative emotions.

Students who practice with their personality tendencies learn which Energies dominate them and how they can move away from their neuroses to the Wisdom aspects that underlie them. The practice helps students understand personality, emotions, and relationships, guiding personal growth from neurotic patterns to liberated awareness.

== See also ==
- Buddhabhūmi Sūtra
- Four Dharmadhātu
- Four ways of knowing
- Achintya Bheda Abheda
- Darśana
- Dhyani Buddhas
- Five Powers
- Mahabhuta
- Pancamakara
- Pancatattva

== Sources ==
=== Published sources ===
- Kalupahana, David J. (1991), Buddhist Thought and Ritual, Paragon House
- Keown, Damien (2003), A Dictionary of Buddhism, Oxford University Press, ISBN 0-19-860560-9
- Thrangu Rinpoche (author) & Peter Roberts (translator) (1998). The Five Buddha Families and The Eight Consciousnesses. Boulder, CO, USA: Published by the Namo Buddha Seminar. Source: Archived 2008-07-20 at the Wayback Machine (accessed: November 22, 2007)
