= Five Pure Lights =

Dzochen teaching

The Five Pure Lights (Wylie: 'od lnga) is an essential teaching in the Dzogchen tradition of Bon and Tibetan Buddhism which relates to the symbolism of colours and their use in meditation. Each colour of the Five Pure Lights is representative of a state of mind, one of the Five Tathāgatas, a natural element, and a body part. Meditating upon one of the Five Pure Lights works to transform a delusion, or one of the five poisons into one of the five wisdoms.

The colours of the Five Pure Lights are:

- Blue, which represents Akshobhya and space. When blue is used in meditation, it works to transform anger into wisdom (Ādarśa-jñāna)
- White, which represents Vairocana and air. When white is used in meditation, it works to transform ignorance into reality (Tathatā-jñāna)
- Red, which represents Amitābha and fire. When red is used in meditation, it works to transform attachment into discernment (Pratyavekṣaṇa-jñāna)
- Green, which represents Amoghasiddhi and water. When green is used in meditation, it works to transform jealousy into accomplishment (Kṛty-anuṣṭhāna-jñāna)
- Yellow, which represents Ratnasambhava and earth. When yellow is used in meditation, it works to transform pride into sameness (Samatā-jñāna)

These colours are often seen on prayer flags and mandalas.

== Basis (gzhi) ==
In the basis (Tibetan: གཞི, Wylie: gzhi) there were neutral awarenesses (shes pa lung ma bstan) that did not recognize themselves. (Dzogchen texts actually do not distinguish whether this neutral awareness is one or multiple.) This non-recognition was the innate ignorance. Due to traces of action and affliction from a previous universe, the basis became stirred and the Five Pure Lights shone out. When a neutral awareness recognized the lights as its own display, then that was Samantabhadra (immediate liberation without the performance of virtue). Other neutral awarenesses did not recognize the lights as their own display, and thus imputed "other" onto the lights. This imputation of "self" and "other" was the imputing ignorance. This ignorance started sentient beings and samsara (even without non-virtue having been committed). Yet everything is illusory, since the basis never displays as anything other than the five lights.

For the deluded, matter seems to appear. This is due to non-recognition of the five lights. Matter includes the mahābhūta or classical elements, namely: space, air, water, fire, earth. The illusion of matter includes even the formless realms and the minds of sentient beings. For example, the beings of the formless realms are made of subtle matter. And the mind of a human is merely matter, specifically vayu (wind, air).

The Five Pure Lights are essentially the Five Wisdoms (Sanskrit: pañca-jñāna). Tenzin Wangyal holds that the Five Pure Lights become the Five Poisons if we remain deluded, or the Five Wisdoms and the Five Buddha Families if we recognize their purity.

In the Bonpo Dzogchen tradition, the Five Pure Lights are discussed in the Zhang Zhung Nyan Gyud and within this auspice two texts in particular go into detail on them as The Six Lamps (Tibetan: སྒྲོན་མ་དྲུག་, Wylie: sgron ma drug) and The Mirror of the Luminous Mind (Tibetan: འོད་གསལ་སེམས་ཀྱི་མེ་ལོང་, Wylie: 'od gsal sems kyi me long).

== Texts ==
The Five Pure Lights are also evident in the terma traditions of the Bardo Thodol (Gyurme, et al. 2005) where they are the "coloured lights" of the bardo for example, associated with the different "families" (Sanskrit: gotra) of deities. There are other evocations of the rainbow lights as well in the Bardo Thodol literature such as Namkha Chokyi Gyatso (1806-1821?), the 3rd Dzogchen Ponlop's "Supplement to the Teaching revealing the Natural Expression of Virtue and Negativity in the Intermediate State of Rebirth", entitled Gong of Divine Melody (Tibetan: སཏྲིད་པའི་བར་དོའི་ངོ་སྤྲོད་དགེ་སྡིག་རང་གཟུགས་སྟོན་པའི་ལྷན་ཐབས་དབྱངས་སྙན་ལྷའི་བཎཌཱི, Wylie: strid pa'i bar do'i ngo sprod dge sdig rang gzugs ston pa'i lhan thabs dbyangs snyan lha'i gaND-I (Note: Caveat lector: 'gaND-I' is a transcription of the Tibetan as per the Extended Wylie Transcription System of Garson & Germano (2001). Conversely, Gyurme et al. (2005: p.433) employ the transcription 'gaṇḍĪ', unfortunately, excavation of this text furnished no key to the Wylie extension employed nor the title rendered in Tibetan script. Hence, the Tibetan has been tentatively reconstructed from this transcription as གཎཌཱི following Garson & Germano (2001) and the pool of phonemic and orthographic possibilities.)), wherein the "mandala of spiralling rainbow lights" Gyurme et al. (2005: p. 339) is associated with Prahevajra. Dudjom, et al. (1991: p. 337) ground the signification of the "mandala of spiralling lights" (Tibetan: འཇོའ་འོད་འཁིལ་བའི་དཀྱིལ་བཧོར, Wylie: 'ja' 'od 'khil ba'i dkyil khor) as seminal to the visionary realization of tögal.

== See also ==
- Five Dhyani Buddhas, with colours associated with the different deities
