= Four Dharmadhātu =

Philosophical concept in Chinese Buddhism

The Four Dharmadhatu (Chinese: 四法界; pinyin: sì fǎjiè) is a philosophical concept propagated by Master Dushun (Chinese: 杜順; 557-640 CE), the founder of the Huayan school. It builds upon and is a variant of the Dharmadhatu doctrine.

== The Four Dharmadhatu ==
The Four Dharmadhatu were outlined in Dushun's treatise, the title of which has been rendered into English as 'On the Meditation of Dharmadhātu'. The Four Dharmadhatu are:

- The Dharmadhātu of Shi (Chinese: 事法界; pinyin: shì fǎjiè). Shi holds the semantic field "matter", "phenomenon", "event". It may be understood as the "realm" (Sanskrit: dhātu) of all matters and phenomena.
- The Dharmadhātu of Li (Chinese: 理法界; pinyin: lǐ fǎjiè). Li holds the semantic field: "principle", "law", "noumenon". This realm may be understood as that of principles. It has been referred to as "the realm of the one principle". The "one principle" being qualified as śūnyatā (Sanskrit).
- The Dharmadhātu of Non-obstruction of Li against Shi (traditional Chinese: 理事無礙法界; simplified Chinese: 理事无碍法界; pinyin: lǐshì wú'ài fǎjiè). This realm has been rendered into English as "the realm of non-obstruction between principle and phenomena".
- The Dharmadhātu of the Non-obstruction of Shi and Shi (traditional Chinese: 事事無礙法界; simplified Chinese: 事事无碍法界; pinyin: shìshì wú'ài fǎjiè). This realm has been rendered into English as "the realm of non-obstruction between phenomena".

== See also ==
- Eight Consciousnesses
- Five wisdoms
- Two truths doctrine
- Yogacara
