= Shabkar Tsokdruk Rangdrol =

Tibetan Buddhist yogi and poet

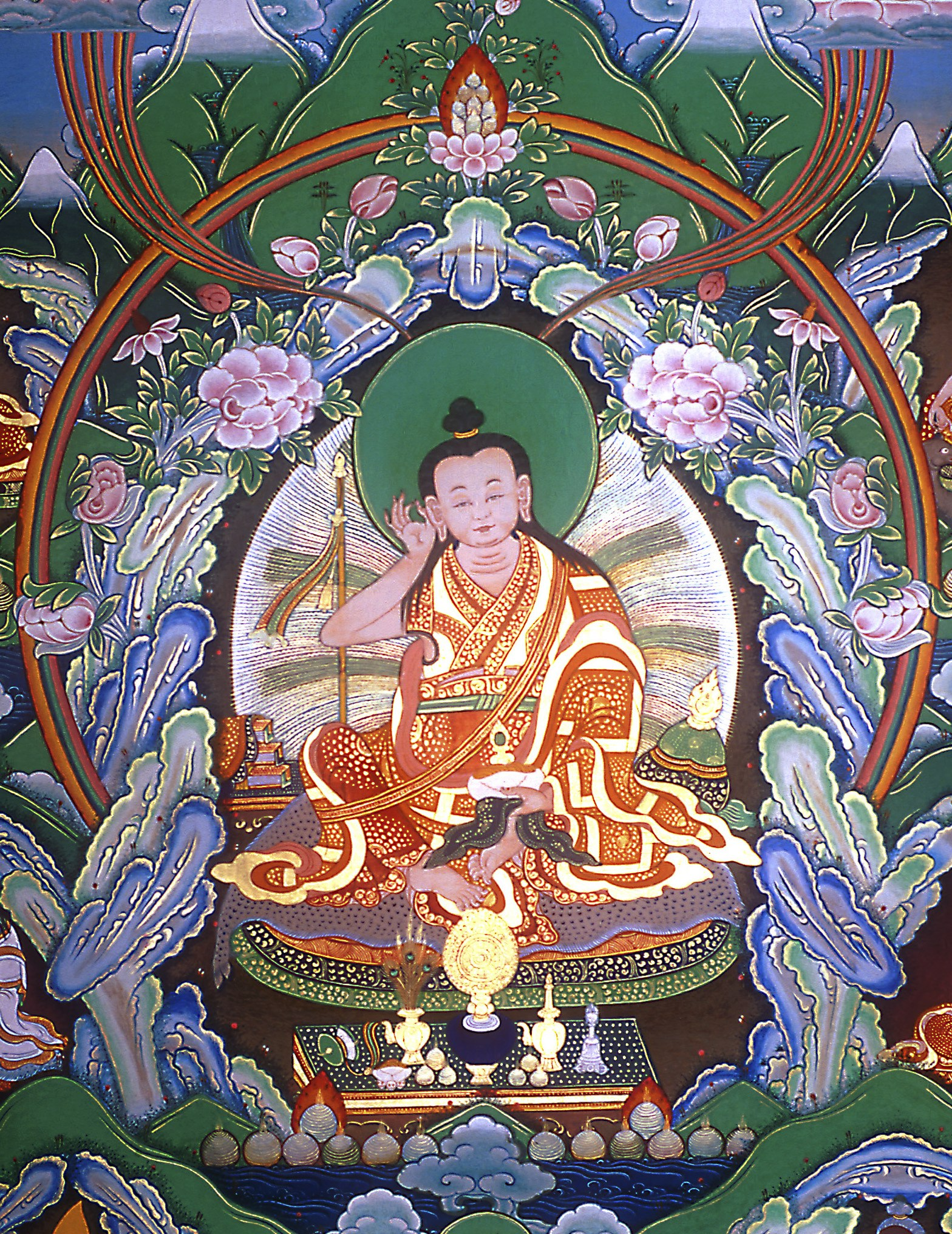
Shabkar

Shabkar Tsokdruk Rangdrol (Tib. ཞབས་དཀར་ཚོགས་དྲུག་རང་གྲོལ་, Wylie. zhabs dkar tshogs drug rang grol) (1781–1851) was a Tibetan Buddhist yogi and poet from Amdo. Shabkar's yogic and poetic skill is considered second only to Milarepa.

Shabkar began his spiritual practice early, completing a one-year retreat at the age of 16, later becoming a Gelug monk at 20. Shabkar studied with masters of all major Tibetan Buddhist schools including Gelug and Nyingma, and received Dzogchen teachings from his main root guru Chögyal Ngakgi Wangpo. He spent years in solitary retreats in various caves, woods and mountains of Tibet.

From 1818 to 1819, he went on a pilgrimage that brought him to Nepal where he made offerings of whitewash and saffron to both the Swayambunath Stupa and the Boudhanath Stupa. He also sponsored two ganachakra feasts, and ransomed the lives a buffalo at each feast instead of killing and eating them.

Shabkar's works express non-sectarian ideals similar to those of the 19th century Rimé movement, even though he predates the movement by about three decades and never met with any of the Rime masters from Kham. Shabkar also held that even non-Buddhist religions are manifestations of the Buddhas:

Thus, one should know all the tenets of the religions of Buddhism and non-Buddhism—for example, other religions, Bönpos, the Chan Buddhists, the Nyingma, the Kagyus, the Sakya, the Gelugs, and so forth—to be the emanations of the buddhas and bodhisattvas.

Shabkar was a prolific writer with his collected works running into several volumes. One of his key works is a series of poems on trekchö and tögal, Khading Shoklap—Flight of the Garuda which has become an important text in the Nyingma Nyingthig tradition.

He also wrote a spiritual autobiography in mixed prose and verse, which is considered one of the lengthiest and most masterful of the Tibetan namtar literature.

Shabkar also wrote works promoting vegetarianism and compassion for animals.

== Writings ==
- Song of the View of the Thorough Cut of Luminosity Great Completion Called "Flight of the Garuda Capable of Quickly Traversing All the Levels and Paths".
- The King of Wish-granting Jewels That Fulfills the Hopes of all Fortunate Disciples who Seek liberation, the detailed narration of the life and liberation of the great vajra-holder Shabkar, refuge and protector for all sentient beings of this Dark Age.
- The Torch That Illuminates the Graded Path
- The Beneficial Sun, A Dharma Discourse
- The Beneficial Moon, The Beneficial Jewel and The Offering Cloud of Samantabhadra
- The Emanated Scriptures of the Kadampas
- The Emanated Scriptures of Manjushri
- The Emanated Scriptures of the Bodhisattva
- The Marvelous Emanated Scriptures
- The Amazing Emanated Scriptures
- The Wondrous Emanated Scriptures
- The Emanated Scriptures of Pure Vision
- The Emanated Scriptures of Orgyen
- The Mountains of Gold
- The Stream of Ambrosia, An Excellent Discourse
- The Self-Arising Sun
- The Emanated Scriptures of Compassion

== See also ==
- Keith Dowman
