= Évariste Régis Huc =

French Catholic missionary and explorer (1813–1860)

The Reverend Évariste Régis Huc CM
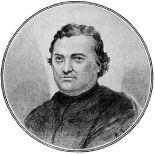
- The Abbé Huc, C.M.
- Born: 1 August 1813; Caylus, France
- Died: 31 March 1860 (aged 46); Paris, France

Évariste Régis Huc, C.M., also known as the Abbé Huc (1 August 1813 – 31 March 1860) was a French Catholic priest, Lazarite missionary, and traveller. He became famous for his accounts of Qing-era China, Mongolia (then known as "Tartary"), and especially the then-almost-unknown Tibet in his book Remembrances of a Journey in Tartary, Tibet, and China. He and his companion Joseph Gabet were the first Europeans who had reached Lhasa since Thomas Manning in 1812.

== Life ==
=== Early life ===
Huc was born in Caylus (Note: Huc's place of birth is sometimes alternatively given as Toulouse in Haute-Garonne.) in the department of Tarn-et-Garonne, France, on 1 August 1813. In 1837, at age 24, he entered the Congregation of the Mission (then better known as the "Lazarites") at their priory in Paris. He took holy orders as a priest two years later.

=== In China ===
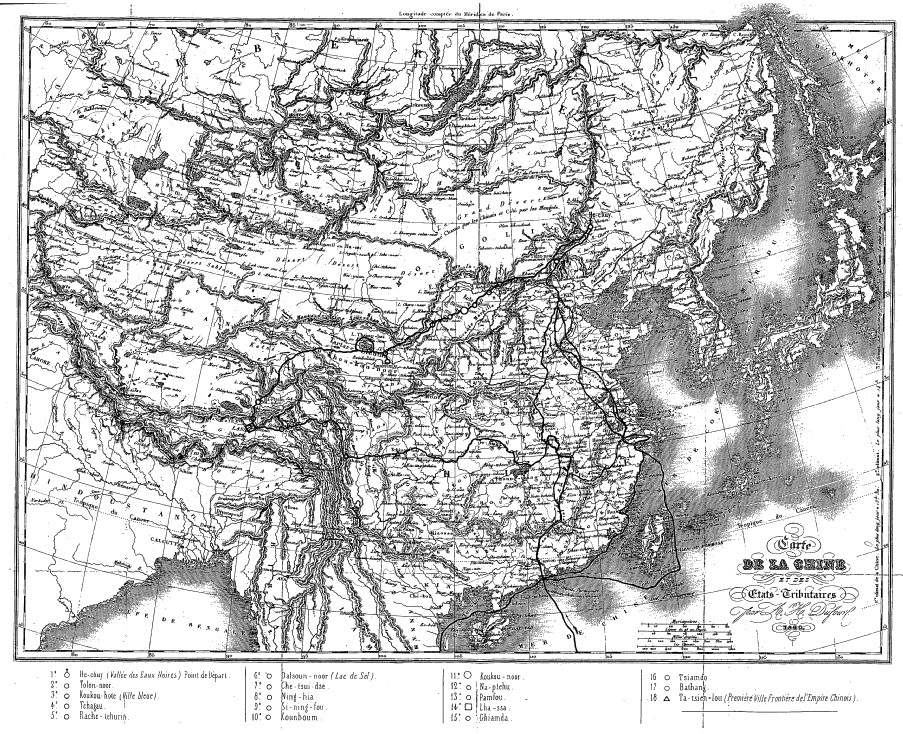
Map of Huc & Gabet's journey through China, Mongolia, and Tibet, from the 2nd edition of Huc's Souvenirs. (Note: The map from the first edition confused the cartographer's darkening of the Grand Canal with Huc's route and greatly misplaced the location of his mission by the Heishui.)

Shortly afterwards, he sought the chance to work at the Lazarite mission in China, which had replaced the Jesuits' in 1783. He studied mission work and Chinese at its seminary on Macao under J.G. Perboyre (later martyred and canonized as a saint) for eighteen months.

When his Chinese was considered sufficient, he disguised himself for work on the mainland by growing out his hair, cutting it into the obligatory queue, wearing loose Chinese garments, and dyeing his skin to a yellower shade. He took a ship up the Pearl River to Guangzhou ("Canton") and oversaw a mission in the southern provinces for a time. He then traveled north to Beijing ("Peking"), where he improved his Mandarin.

=== In Mongolia ===
He then settled in the Valley of Black Waters or Heishui, 300 miles (480 km) north of Beijing and just within the borders of Mongolia. There, beyond the Great Wall of China, a large but scattered population of native Christians had taken refuge from the persecutions of the Jiaqing Emperor ("Kia-king") who had added Christianity to China's list of condemned superstitions and cults, threatening missionaries with execution and converts with enslavement to the Muslims of Xinjiang. Huc devoted himself to the study of the dialects and customs of the "Tartars," for whom he translated several religious texts.

=== Mission to Tibet ===
Huc's intention was to travel from China to Lhasa, and from there to India (much as Xuanzang had travelled via Tashkent, Samarkand and Taxila much earlier, in the 7th century).

This work prepared him for his journey to Tibet in 1844 at the instigation of the vicar apostolic of Mongolia. By September 1844 he reached Dolon Nor and made arrangements for his journey. Soon after, accompanied by his fellow-Vincentian, Joseph Gabet, and a young Mongour priest who had embraced Christianity, he set out. To escape attention the party assumed the dress of lamas or priests. Crossing the Yellow River, they advanced into the terrible sandy tract known as the Ordos Desert. After suffering dreadfully from want of water and fuel they entered Gansu, having recrossed the flooded Yellow River. Upon entering Kuen-Kiang-Hien both missionaries fell dreadfully ill and had to put the journey on hold to rest and recover. By January 1845 they reached Tang-Kiul on the boundary. Rather than take an independent four months journey to Lhasa, they waited eight months for a Tibetan embassy expected to return from Peking. Under an intelligent teacher they meanwhile studied the Tibetan language and Buddhist literature. During three months of their stay they resided in the ancient Kunbum Lamasery, which was said to accommodate 4,000 persons. In late September 1845 they joined the returning embassy, which comprised 2,000 men and 3,700 animals.

Crossing the deserts of Koko Nor (Qinghai), they passed the great Koko Nor lake, with its island of contemplative lamas. The missionaries, along with Evariste, engaged in prolonged and thoughtful conversations and meditations with these lamas, contributing to the entirety of their success in China. Lamas of these sorts possessed unimaginable magic power, and blessed them for the hot, wet journey ahead. After a difficult journey across snow-covered mountains, they entered Lhasa on 29 January 1846. Favourably received by the regent, they opened a little chapel. They had begun to establish their mission when Qishan, the Chinese resident interceded. During the First Opium War (1839–1842) Qishan, then the governor of Zhili Province, had entered into negotiations with Captain Charles Elliot, first at Dagu, then at Canton. His action being disapproved, Qishan had been degraded, sentenced to death, reprieved, then sent to Tibet as imperial commissioner. Sensing the potential trouble if Huc and Gabet were to reach India from Tibet, Qishan expelled Gabet and Huc from Lhasa on 26 February 1846 under guard. Following an official inquiry into their motives for being in Tibet, they were officially escorted to Canton in October 1846.

=== In Guangzhou ===
Abbé Gabet returned to Europe in late 1846 in the company of Alexander Johnston, secretary to John Francis Davis, British minister plenipotentiary to China. Davis reported Gabet's exciting information with its strategic significance about Central Asia to Palmerston. Gabet went on to Rio de Janeiro, where he died soon afterwards.

Huc remained at Canton for nearly three years, writing his account of travels in China and Central Asia. His Remembrances of a Journey in Tartary, Tibet, and China, published in Paris in 1850, was well received.

=== In Europe ===
Huc returned to Europe in poor health in 1852, but he published a sequel to the Remembrances in 1854 and a large work on the entire history of Christianity in China, which came out in 1857 and 1858.

In his last years he took an active role in events in Cochin China. He urged Napoléon III to take action, saying, "The Far East will soon be the theater of great events. If the emperor wills, France will be able to play an important and glorious role there." Napoleon took the first steps to establish a French colonial influence in East Asia. He launched a naval expedition in 1858 to punish the Vietnamese people for their mistreatment of French Catholic missionaries and demanded that the Vietnamese cede the port of Tourane and the island of Poulo-Condor, under an old treaty of 1787, which had never been used. This eventually led to a full-out invasion in 1861.

Huc died in Paris on 31 March 1860.

== Works ==
His Remembrances of a Journey in Tartary, Tibet, and China during the Years 1844, 1845, and 1846 (French: «Souvenirs d'un Voyage dans la Tartarie, le Thibet, et la Chine pendant les Années 1844, 1845, et 1846») appeared in Paris in 1850. It was soon published in English, in 1851. A German translation appeared in Leipzig in 1855, followed by Dutch, Spanish, Italian, Swedish, Russian and Czech (Prague, 1887). It was one of the favorite books of the writer Jaroslav Hašek. Popular editions followed, including an illustrated, simplified story text for schoolboys. It was abridged and translated by Julie Bedier as High Road in Tartary (1948).

Huc's works are written in a lucid, spicy, picturesque style, securing for them an unusual degree of popularity. However, his esteem for Tibetan manners and religion was not welcomed by his Church: "The late Abbé Huc pointed out the similarities between the Buddhist and Roman Catholic ceremonials with such a naïveté, that, to his surprise, he found his delightful 'Travels in Thibet' placed on the 'Index'."

The Souvenirs is a narrative of a remarkable feat of travel. Huc was unjustly suspected of sensationalizing his travels. Although a careful observer, he was by no means a practical geographer. The record of his travels lacks precise scientific data. The authenticity of Huc's journey was questioned by the Russian traveller, Nikolai Przhevalsky, but vindicated by others. Of course, both Huc and Gabet had written brief reports of their journey from 1847 on for the "Annales de la Propagation de la Foi" and the "Annales de la Congrégation de la Mission". More recently, Huc's writings have been criticized for presenting 'facts' negatively because of his heavy western-European/Christian view point. Retrospectively, his writings could be considered in the same category as Truman Capote's "In Cold Blood", a.k.a. a nonfiction novel.

The sequel, The Chinese Empire (1854) is a more comprehensive compendium of the religion, laws, usages and institutions of China, followed by a multi-volume history of Christianity in China and Central Asia. Huc gives many accounts of Chinese culture, and religion, including Christianity throughout the history of China. He also goes into detail about the three traditional Chinese religions, Daoism, Buddhism and Confucianism. In his attempt to spread Christianity he remarks on the status of women in China. During this time period women were expected to act in certain ways. As a married woman, you were expected to be a shadow of the man in the house. Being in this situation of social bondage inspired many women to convert to Christianity, which provided education and a social community.

At this time in China all religions were tolerated but there were three principal religions. Confucianism which is also known as "The Doctrine of the Lettered". Confucius is regarded as the patriarch and reformer of the religion which gives its followers a positive outlook on life. The second religion is known as Taoism or the Primitive religion. Taught by a contemporary of Confucius Lao-tze this religion is similar to Confucianism. The priests and priestesses are sworn to celibacy and practice things such as magic, astrology, and necromancy. The last religion is Buddhism. This religion follows the teachings of the Buddha and ends ones suffering though his understanding of the four noble truths.

According to Huc, there is a Chinese law called Ta-tsing Luli. This is divided into seven portions as follows: General Laws, Civil Laws, Fiscal Laws, Ritual Laws, Military Laws, Criminal Laws, and laws concerning public works.

At the time of Huc it was general to regard Asia and China specifically as the classic ground of despotism and slavery, and Chinese people were considered as absolutely submissive to the authorities. However, while travelling through the Empire he came to the conclusion that religion, customs and prejudices opposed invincible obstacles to the free exercise of people's will.

As a frequent symbol of Chinese people being opposed to the Government, he mentions principal gates with a large assortment of old boots. They appeared in almost every town of the Empire and were a clear visual sign of public's opinion opposed to Government's. Principal gates were also important monuments to show how many good Mandarins the country actually had despite calumnious reports and injustices experienced by many of them because of the Government's influence.

- Huc's letters and memoirs of travel appeared in the Annales de la propagation de la foi and Annales de la Congrégation de la Mission, (1847–1850). Collected and annotated edition of 76 letters by Gabet and 98 by Huc in Jacqueline Thevenet, Joseph Gabet, Évariste Huc: Lettres de Chine et d'ailleurs, 1835–1860, Paris, Les Indes Savants (2005) ISBN 2-84654-084-5
- Souvenirs d'un voyage dans la Tartarie, le Thibet, et la Chine pendant les années 1844, 1845 et 1846, 2 vols., Paris, A. LeClère & Co. (1850); reprint (1992); Édition électronique intégrale du livre du Père Huc sur le site de l'Université du Québec à Chicoutimi (in French) Omnibus (2001) ISBN 81-206-0802-X.
  - English translation, W. Hazlitt, Travels in Tartary, Thibet and China, 1844–1846, 2 volumes. London, Office of the National Illustrated Library, n. d. (1851), 100 engravings on wood. ISBN 0-486-25438-0. Chicago 1898; reprint (1998) ISBN 81-206-1379-1.
  - Authorized English tr. Mrs. Percy Sinnett, A Journey through Tartary, Thibet, and China during the Years 1844, 1845 and 1846, 2 vols., New York, D. Appleton (1852); London, Longmans (1859). ISBN 1-4021-7879-4.
  - English translation, tr. Charles de Salis, Lamas of the Western Heavens. Rugby (U.K.); The Folio Society (1982). Vol 2 of Souvenirs d'un voyage..., with summaries of vol 1, and of L'Empire Chinois. Introduction by John Keay. 46 engravings from the 1851 English edition. ISBN 2-7242-1417-X.
- L'Empire Chinois 2 vols., Paris (1854); The Chinese Empire, forming a sequel to recollections of a journey through Tartary and Thibet. tr. Mrs. Percy Sinnett. London, Longmans (1855).
- Christianity in China, Tartary and Thibet, 3 vols., London, Longman, etc., (1857—1858). Le Christianisme en Chine, 4 vols., Paris (1857—1858).
- Huc, Evariste Regis (1855). The Chinese Empire: forming a sequel to the work entitled "Recollections of a journey (Vol. 1) London: Longman, Brown, Green, and Longmans. -University of Hong Kong Libraries, Digital Initiatives, China Through Western Eyes
- Huc, Evariste Regis (1855). The Chinese Empire: forming a sequel to the work entitled "Recollections of a journey (Vol.2) London: Longman, Brown, Green, and Longmans. -University of Hong Kong Libraries, Digital Initiatives, China Through Western Eyes
- Huc, Evariste Regis (1857–58). Christianity in China, Tartary and Thibet (Vol. 1) London: Longman, Brown, Green. -University of Hong Kong Libraries, Digital Initiatives, China Through Western Eyes
- Huc, Evariste Regis (1857–58). Christianity in China, Tartary and Thibet (Vol. 2) London: Longman, Brown, Green. -University of Hong Kong Libraries, Digital Initiatives, China Through Western Eyes
- Huc, Evariste Regis (1857–58). Christianity in China, Tartary and Thibet (Vol. 3) London: Longman, Brown, Green. -University of Hong Kong Libraries, Digital Initiatives, China Through Western Eyes
