= 8th Arjia Rinpoche =

Current incarnation of the Arjia Hotogtu

Lobsang Tubten Jigme Gyatso
- བློ་བཟང་ཐུབ་བསྟན་འཇིགས་མེད་རྒྱ་མཚོ།
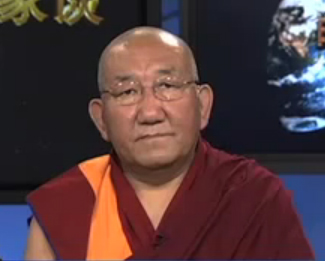
- 8th Arjia Rinpoche in 2011 on Voice of America

Agya Hotogtu
- Incumbent
- Assumed office 1950
- Preceded by: Lobsang Lundak Jigme Tanbe Gyaltsen

Member of the 7th, 8th Chinese People's Political Consultative Conference
- In office April 1988 – March 1998 fled abroad in February 1998
- Chairman: Li Xiannian→Li Ruihuan

Member of the Standing Committee of the 9th Chinese People's Political Consultative Conference
- In office fled abroad before taking office in March 1998
- Chairman: Li Ruihuan

Personal details
- Born: 1950 (age 75–76) Haiyan County, Qinghai, China

Lobsang Tubten Jigme Gyatso (བློ་བཟང་ཐུབ་བསྟན་འཇིགས་མེད་རྒྱ་མཚོ།), officially the 8th Arjia Hotogtu (ཨ་ཀྱཱ་ཧོ་ཐོག་ཐུ།), born 1950 in Haiyan County, Qinghai) is one of the most prominent Buddhist teachers and lamas to have left Tibet. At age two, Arjia Rinpoche was recognized by Choekyi Gyaltsen, 10th Panchen Lama as the 20th Arjia Danpei Gyaltsen, the reincarnation of Je Tsongkhapa's father, Lumbum Ghe, the throne holder and abbot of Kumbum Monastery. He has trained with lineage teachers, such as the 14th Dalai Lama, the 10th Panchen Lama, and Gyayak Rinpoche—from whom he received many sacred teachings and ritual instructions.

During the Cultural Revolution in Chinese controlled Tibet, Arjia Rinpoche was forced to leave his monastery and attend a Chinese school, yet secretly continued to practice and study with his tutors. In addition, he was required to work in a forced Labor Camp for 16 years. Following the Cultural Revolution, Rinpoche continued serving as Abbot of Kumbum—overseeing the renovations in the monastery and reestablishing monastic studies. In 1998, due to the strained political climate in Tibet, Arjia Rinpoche went into exile claiming he would not compromise his spiritual beliefs and practices. He escaped to the United States where he now lives and started a Buddhist Center for Compassion and Wisdom (TCCW) in Mill Valley, California, a center committed to the preservation of Buddhist teachings, art and culture within and outside of Tibet and Mongolia. In 2005, he was appointed Director of the Tibetan Cultural Center (TCC) in Bloomington, Indiana by the 14th Dalai Lama. TCC was recently renamed the Tibetan Mongolian Buddhist Cultural Center. Presently, he directs both TCCW and TMBCC.

Arjia Rinpoche excels in the knowledge and understanding of Tibetan art, architecture and the Tibetan Language. He has given classes in Buddhist Art and Sutra throughout the United States, Canada, Taiwan, India and Guatemala. In 1999, Rinpoche built a three-dimensional Kalachakra mandala and presented it to the Dalai Lama. Later, the Dalai Lama donated this mandala to the Smithsonian Institution in Washington, DC.

Kumbum Monastery, one of the six largest monasteries of the Gelug school of Tibetan Buddhism, is the birthplace of Je Tsongkhapa (founder of the school which is now headed by the Dalai Lama). Kumbum Monastery was once the home of 3,600 monks and well revered by the four well known Buddhist Colleges for higher learning: The Institute of Sutra, Institute of Tantra, Institute of Tibetan Medicine, and the Institute of the Kalachakra (Astrology). In the 1980s, after Buddhism began to revive in Tibet and in China, Arjia Rinpoche reestablished monastic life and traditional studies at Kumbum.

Throughout his life, Arjia Rinpoche was tutored by specialized teachers in the area of Buddhist philosophy, sutra and tantra teachings, as well as in Buddhist art and architectural design. He was in charge of the renovations of Kumbum monastery in 1991 and launched several projects including the following: Red Cross Organization in Kumbum, Disaster Relief Project for local villages, a clinic for villagers run by monks of the Tibetan Medical Institute and a school for local village children.

Arjia Rinpoche became vegetarian in 1999.
