= Dushun =

Buddhist patriarch

Dushun (Chinese: 杜順; pinyin: Dùshùn; Wade–Giles: Tu-shun) (557–640) was the First Patriarch of the Huayan School of Chinese Buddhism, which has the Indian Avatamsaka Sutra as its central scripture.

== Biography ==
Dushun was born in present-day Shaanxi province. He ordained at the age of seventeen and became a student of a monk named Weichen, from whom he learned meditation at Yinsheng temple. Dushun later retired to Zhixiang temple, a monastery in the Zhongnan mountains in the south of Shaanxi. There, Dushun began an in-depth study of the Avataṃsaka Sūtra. The second patriarch, Zhiyan (602-668 CE), studied under Dushun at Zhixiang temple and became recognized as his formal successor.

Dushun was also a devotee of Amitabha and Manjusri, and promoted their worship among the laity.

== Works ==
Around fourteen works have been ascribed to Dushun throughout history; however, only two works can be definitively attributed to him. The first is The Ten Mysterious Gates of the Unitary Vehicle of the Huayan (zh: Huayan yisheng shixuan men). This text was composed by Zhiyan (602-668 CE), the second patriarch, but is supposedly a record of the oral teachings of Dushun.

The second is Discernments of the Dharmadhātu of the Huayan (zh: Huayan fajie guanmen), which does not survive as a stand-alone text but can be found in its entirety in several later commentaries. This text has been translated by Thomas Cleary embedded with the commentary by Chengguan in his Entry Into the Inconceivable.

One highly influential text attributed to Dushun is Cessation and Contemplation in the Five Teachings of the Huayan (zh: Huayan wujiao zhiguan); however, the authorship of this text is disputed. This has been translated by Cleary in his Entry Into the Inconceivable.

== Bibliography ==
- Buswell, Robert E., Lopez, Donald S. Jr. (2014). The Princeton Dictionary of Buddhism, Princeton University Press, p. 275 (Dushun)
- Hamar, Imre, ed. (2007), Reflecting Mirrors: Perspectives on Huayan Buddhism. Wiesbaden: Harrassowitz Verlag. ISBN 978-3-447-05509-3.
- Cleary, Thomas. Entry Into the Inconceivable: An Introduction to Hua-yen Buddhism. University of Hawaii Press, 1983. ISBN 978-0-8248-0824-2.
- Van Norden, Bryan, and Nicholaos Jones. "Huayan Buddhism." The Stanford Encyclopedia of Philosophy (Winter 2019 Edition).
