= Joseph Gabet =

French Catholic missionary (1808–1853)

Chinese name
- Traditional Chinese: 秦噶嗶
- Simplified Chinese: 秦噶哔
Transcriptions
Standard Mandarin
- Hanyu Pinyin: Qín Gábì
- Wade–Giles: Ch‘in Ka-pi

Joseph Gabet (4 December 1808 – 1853) was a French Catholic Lazarite missionary. He was active in Northern China and Mongolia before traveling to Tibet with Évariste Huc. Expelled and arrested, he died in Rio de Janeiro, Brazil.

== Biography ==
Joseph Gabet was born 4 December 1808 at Nevy-sur-Seille in France's Jura Department. He was ordained priest in 1833 and joined the Lazarite order. In 1834, in company with his fellow Lazarite missionaries Jean-Gabriel Perboyre and Joseph Perry, he travelled to China. After arriving in Macao in 1835 he learned Chinese before being sent to Tartary in the north of the Chinese Empire, later known as Manchuria.

In 1844, together with Évariste Huc, another Lazarite missionary, and a young Mongol lama, he set out on a journey westward to explore "Mongol Tartary". They stayed for six months in the monastery of Kounboum near Koukou-Noor (Lake Qinghai), learning the Tibetan language and studying the Buddhist religion, before setting out for Tibet in September 1845.

They attached themselves to the caravan of the Dalai Lama's emissary returning from Peking (Beijing). Crossing the high plateaux in midwinter Gabet came close to dying of cold. The caravan reached Lhasa in January 1846. Évariste Huc described the journey in his book "Souvenirs d’un voyage dans la Tartarie, le Thibet et la Chine pendant les années 1844, 1845 et 1846" ("Memories of a journey through Tartary, Tibet and China in 1844, 1845 and 1846").

Although well received by the Minister-Regent who governed Tibet in the name of the Dalai Lama, the missionaries aroused the suspicion of Qishan, the Chinese Emperor's resident representative in Tibet, who secured their expulsion in February 1846. Gabet and Huc were sent with an official escort via "Ta-Tsien-Lou" (Kangding) and Chengdu to Canton, arriving there in September 1846. Huc described the journey to Canton in his book "L'empire chinois" ("The Chinese Empire").

Gabet hoped to secure permission from the Chinese and Tibetan authorities for himself and Huc to return to Tibet but was ordered to return to Europe without delay in order to help resolve the dispute that had arisen between the Lazarite order and the Missions étrangères over the reallocation of responsibility for mission work in Tibet after Gabet et Huc were thought to have disappeared.

Gabet's 90-page report addressed to the Pope, "Coup d'œil sur l'état des missions de Chine présenté au Saint-Père le pape Pie IX" ("View of the state of the missions in China presented to the Holy Father Pope Pius IX"), published in France in 1848, was severely critical of the state of the Catholic mission to China and its future prospects. Christian missionaries had returned to China at the start of the 19th century after a long absence that followed the end of the Jesuit mission when the Order was dissolved by the Pope in 1773). In spite of the 1735 edict proscribing Christian worship, Christian communities were broadly tolerated provided that they remained discreet. Nevertheless, Jean-Gabriel Perboyre had been executed in public in Wuhan in 1840. The edict of official tolerance appended to the Treaty of Whampoa (Huangpu) between France and China was only promulgated in 1844.

Joseph Gabet examined the limited success that the missions had achieved, despite the number of missionaries sent out and the funds that had been devoted to mission work in China. He drew attention to the Church's success in establishing itself in the West in the early centuries, despite persecution, thanks to its reliance on hard work as well as the grace of God, and he believed the same could be accomplished in China. He observed that:

- the missionaries were not sufficiently familiar with the language and showed insufficient respect for Chinese culture;
- only a limited number of locally born Chinese were trained for the priesthood and they were not treated as equals by the missionaries; their training was at odds with their culture;
- missionaries belonging to different orders quarreled over territories and communities to the point of attracting the attention of the civil authorities and causing scandal to the faithful.

The work was not well received in Rome or by the missionaries. In 1850 his superior in China, the Vicar Apostolic of Manchuria, had him condemned by the Congregation for the Propagation of the Faith. Gabet's ideas on the subject of "inculturation" were neglected until the 20th century when they were taken up again with more success by Vincent Lebbe (1877 - 1940)).

In 1848, Gabet's superiors sent him to Brazil to become almoner to a convent of nuns. He died of yellow fever in Rio de Janeiro in March 1853, at the age of 45.

== See also ==
- Catholic Church in Tibet
