= Tenzin Wangyal Rinpoche =

Tibetan Lama

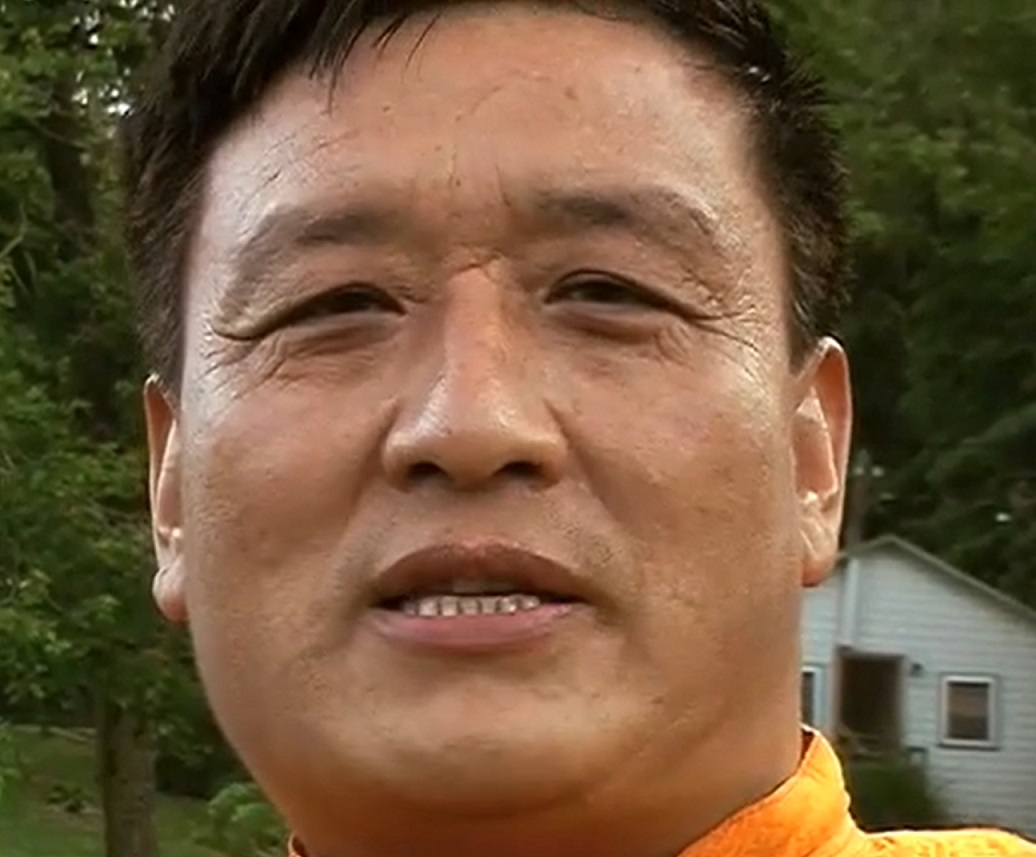
Tenzin Wangyal

Tenzin Wangyal Rinpoche (Tib. o thog bstan 'dzin dbang rgyal) is a teacher (lama) of the Bon Tibetan religious tradition. He is founder and director of the Ligmincha Institute and several centers named Chamma Ling, organizations dedicated to the study and practice of the teachings of the Bon tradition.

== Life ==
Tenzin Wangyal's parents fled the Chinese invasion of Tibet and later, in 1961, he was born in Amritsar, India. At the age of eleven, he began dzogchen training from both Buddhist and Bon teachers. He began an eleven-year traditional course of instruction at Bonpo Monastic Center and in 1986 attained the degree of Geshe, the highest academic degree of traditional Tibetan culture. That same year, Tenzin Wangyal began employment at the Library of Tibetan Works and Archives in Dharamsala, India.

In 1988 he began to teach in Italy at the invitation of Chögyal Namkhai Norbu. In 1991, he was awarded a Rockefeller Fellowship at Rice University in Houston, Texas, US. A second Rockefeller Fellowship followed in 1993.

Tenzin Wangyal has chosen to stay in the United States and teach ancient Bon traditions to Western students.

Tenzin Wangyal has an interest in the interpretation, control and application of dreams and has written fairly extensively on lucid dreaming and dream yoga as well as Dzogchen in Bon tradition.

== Bibliography ==
- Tenzin Wangyal Rinpoche (1998). The Tibetan Yogas of Dream and Sleep. Snow Lion Publications. ISBN 1-55939-101-4.
- Tenzin Wangyal Rinpoche (2000). Wonders of the Natural Mind. Snow Lion Publications. ISBN 1-55939-142-1.
- Tenzin Wangyal Rinpoche (2002). Healing with Form, Energy, and Light. Snow Lion Publications. ISBN 1-55939-176-6.
- Tenzin Wangyal Rinpoche; Anne Carolyn Klein (2006). Unbounded Wholeness, Dzogchen, Bon and the Logic of the Nonconceptual. Oxford University Press. ISBN 0-19-517850-5.
- Tenzin Wangyal Rinpoche (2006). Tibetan Sound Healing. Sounds True. ISBN 1-59179-427-7.
- Tenzin Wangyal Rinpoche (2011). Tibetan Yogas of Body, Speech, and Mind. Snow Lion. ISBN 978-1559393805.
- Tenzin Wangyal Rinpoche (2011). Awakening the Sacred Body. Hay House. ISBN 978-1-4019-2871-1.
- Tenzin Wangyal Rinpoche (2012). Awakening the Luminous Mind. Hay House. ISBN 978-1-4019-3761-4.
- Tenzin Wangyal Rinpoche (2015). The True Source of Healing: How the Ancient Tibetan Practice of Soul Retrieval Can Transform and Enrich Your Life. Hay House. ISBN 978-1-4019-4449-0.
- Tenzin Wangyal Rinpoche (2018). Spontaneous Creativity: Meditations for Manifesting Your Positive Qualities. Hay House. ISBN 1-4019-5489-8

== See also ==
- Dzogchen
- Tsa lung
- Tummo
- Dream Yoga
