= Shingqo Sheli Tutung =

Shingqo Sheli Tutung or Šéŋko Šeli Tutuŋ (Old Uyghur: 𐽿𐽶𐽺𐽲𐾄𐽳 𐽿𐽰𐾁𐽶 𐾀𐽳𐾀𐽳𐽺𐽷, 勝光闍梨都統 (ɕɨŋ kwɑŋ d͡ʑia liɪ tuo tʰuoŋ^{H})), also known by his Chinese name Master Shengguang (Chinese: 胜光法师; pinyin: Shèngguāng Fǎshī) was an Uyghur scholar, translator and poet lived in 11th-12th centuries.

== Identity ==
Born in Beshbalik, he was a Buddhist. He is mostly regarded as an Uyghur, but Takao Moriyasu argued that he could be Chinese as well. Klaus Röhrborn believed that he was not only a translator, but a Chinese head of a group of Uyghur translators who worked on Buddhist texts. He was also described as a poet since he translated original Chinese poems creatively, without limiting himself with literal translation. He is also described as well-versed in kāvya style.

== Works ==
He is mostly known for his translation of Golden Light Sutra from Chinese to Old Uyghur, which he dubbed Altun Yaruq (Golden Light). A copy of this was found by Russian turkologist Sergey Malov in a Buddhist stupa used by Yugurs in Wenshugou (文殊沟) village in Sunan, which was made in 1687 by Bilge Taluy Shashi. Yet another copy of it was found by Friedrich Müller during his Turfan expedition. He was proficient in Sankskrit and Tocharian. He is also known as a translator of the biography of Xuanzang. In 2000, Kahar Barat published an annotated English edition of parts of this translation. He could be a follower of Vijñānavāda, a Buddhist philosophy embraced by Xuanzang himself. He is also credited with translation of "Eight Heaven Sutra" from Chinese to Uyghur which he named Säkiz Yükmäk Yaruq. An extensive work dedicated to this translation has been authored by Juten Oda.

== Notes ==
1.Full title in Old Uyghur: Altun örjlüg yaruk yaltriklig kopda kötrülmis nom eligi atlig nom bitig (Shining with golden luster, exalted king-book above all)
2.Full title: Chinese: 佛說天地八陽神咒經; pinyin: Fú shuō tiāndì bāyáng shénzhòu jīng; lit. 'The Scripture of the Divine Spell of the Eight Yang of Heaven and Earth Spoken by the Buddha'; Old Uyghur: Täŋri Burhan yarlıkamıš täŋrili yerli säkiz yükmäk yaruk bügülüg arvıš nom bitig bir tägzinč
