= Golden Light Sutra =

Sutra in Mahāyāna Buddhism

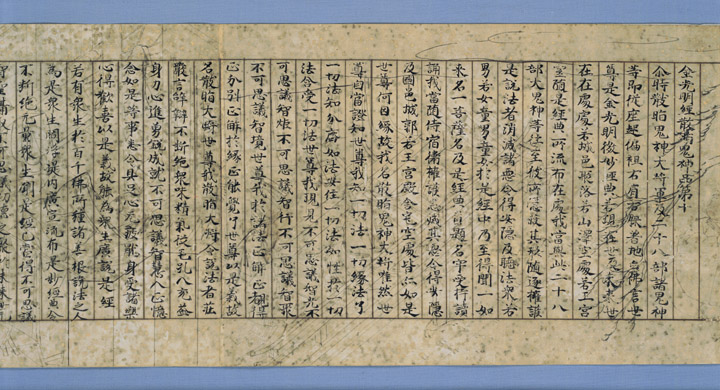
A Japanese handscroll of the Golden Light Sutra (J: Konkōmyōkyō).

The Golden Light Sutra (Sanskrit: Suvarṇaprabhāsottamasūtra, lit. Sublime Golden Light Sutra; Chinese: 金光明經, Jin guangming jing) is a Mahayana Buddhist scripture, which has been important as an apotropaic and purificatory text. A significant portion of the sutra is directed at monarchs or involves supernatural protection and it has thus been an important source for Buddhist states and rulers who wish to protect themselves and their nations.

The title of the sutra comes from the central fourth chapter, in which a lay bodhisattva named Ruciraketu sees a shining golden drum in a dream. The drum emanates light and a hundred-verse prayer to the Buddha when beaten. Much of the subsequent sutra teaches the recitation of this prayer along with devotion to the Golden Light Sutra itself. Self-referential discussion of the powers of the Golden Light Sutra is another key theme of the text, which also calls itself the "king of kings of sūtras". The Golden Light also contains a key chapter on repentance, which is a central practice in East Asian Buddhism.

Divine protection is yet another key teaching of the text, which explains how numerous divine beings, including the Four Heavenly Kings, the goddess of the earth, Sarasvatī, and Śrī, will protect those who recite the prayer and the sutra. The sutra also emphasizes that kings who support and honor the recitation of the Golden Light Sutra will have a prosperous and peaceful kingdom, free of invasions, disasters and famine. Due to these purported benefits, the Golden Light became an influential ritual text in Mahayana Buddhism, especially in East Asia where it had a key ceremonial role in state protection ceremonies. It is still recited in East Asian Buddhism and in Tibetan Buddhism for its protective and pacifying effects.

== Overview ==
The sutra was originally written in India in Sanskrit and was translated several times into Chinese by Dharmakṣema, Yijing, and others, and was later translated into Tibetan and other languages. Johannes Nobel published Sanskrit and Tibetan editions of the text. The sutra remains influential in East Asian Buddhism.

The sutra opens with the Buddha at Vulture Peak praising the powers of the Golden Light Sutra itself to protect from calamities, disease and misfortune, which represents the very Dharmadhātu itself, the "profound range of buddhas" (gaṃbhīra buddhagocara). The following overview is based on the long thirty one chapter versions.

In the second chapter, the "Lifespan of the Tathāgata" chapter (Tathāgatāyuḥpramāṇaparivarta), we are introduced to the bodhisattva Ruciraketu, who is confused as to why the Buddha only lived 80 years. Then the buddhas of the four directions appear and reveal the truth to him: the Buddha's life is actually immeasurable and inconceivable. When a bramin asks the Buddha for a relic, the sutra presents a verse which explains that there are no real relics (dhātu) of the Buddha, since the real relic is the Dharmadhātu and the eternal Buddha body, the Dharmakaya. This section also contains some elements which may have influenced Esoteric Buddhism, including an early depiction of the mandala of the four buddhas of the four cardinal directions. These same four buddhas comprise later Buddhist mandalas in the same positions, and later came to be known as the main Buddhas of the Five Tathagatas schema.

Chapter three, "Distinguishing the Three Bodies", contains an important exposition of the key Mahayana doctrine of the Trikaya (Triple Body of the Buddha).

The name of the sutra derives from the fourth chapter called "The Confession of the Golden Drum" (in Sanskrit: Deśanāparivarta, Confession chapter), where the bodhisattva Ruchiraketu dreams of a great drum that radiates a sublime golden light, symbolizing the dharma or teachings of Śākyamuni Buddha. Ruchiraketu then hears a verse prayer (also called the "Golden Light"). The prayer is at once a wish for the happiness of all beings, a confession of one's bad deeds and a praise of the Buddha. This confession verse is said to have the power to destroy the bad karma of a thousand eons in a single recitation. The chapter also ends by saying that those who hear this verse have already served thousands of buddhas in the past.

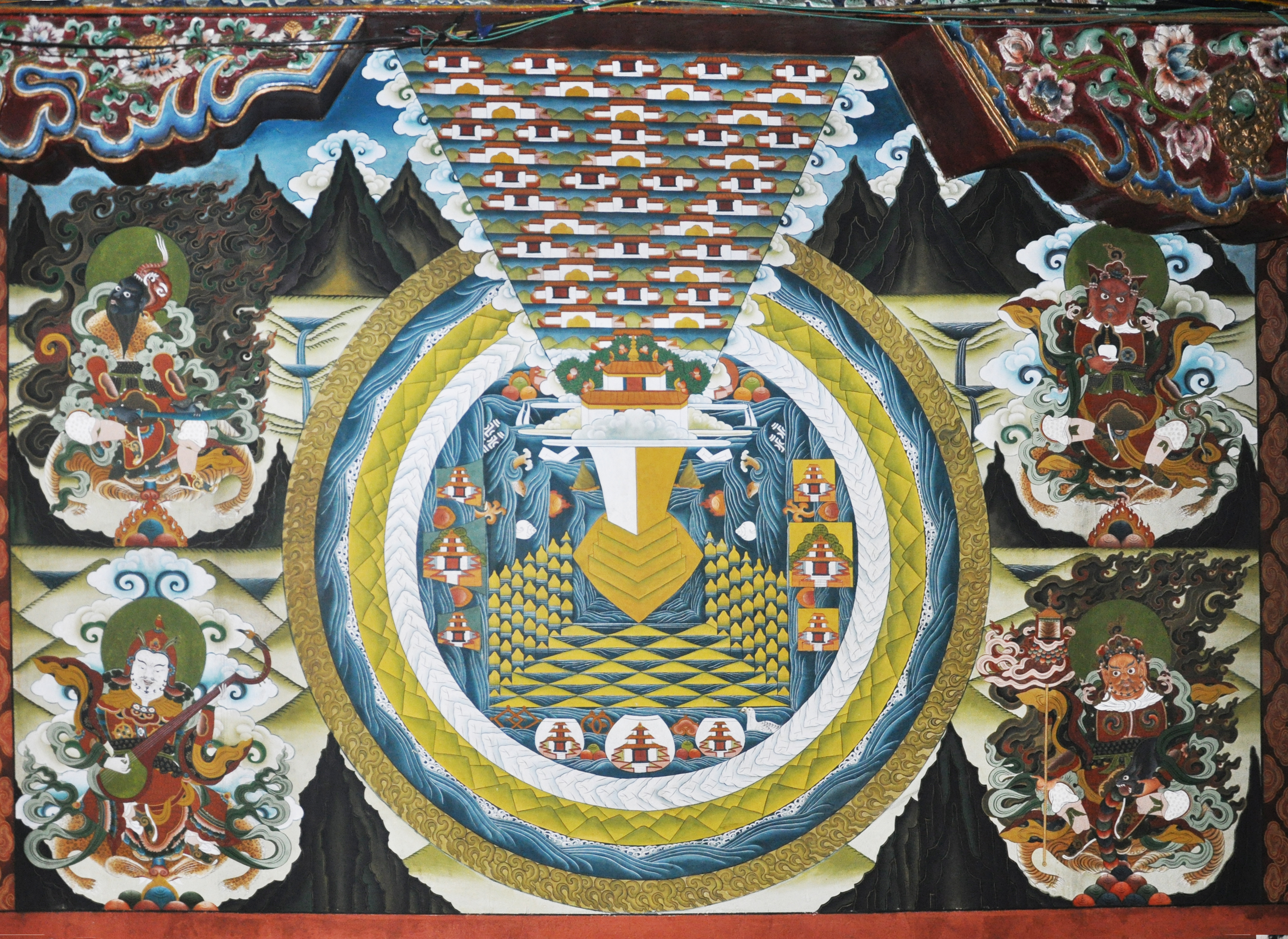
A traditional Buddhist depiction of our world system with the Four Heavenly Kings (Dhṛtarāṣṭra, Virūḍhaka, Virūpākṣa, Vaiśravaṇa).

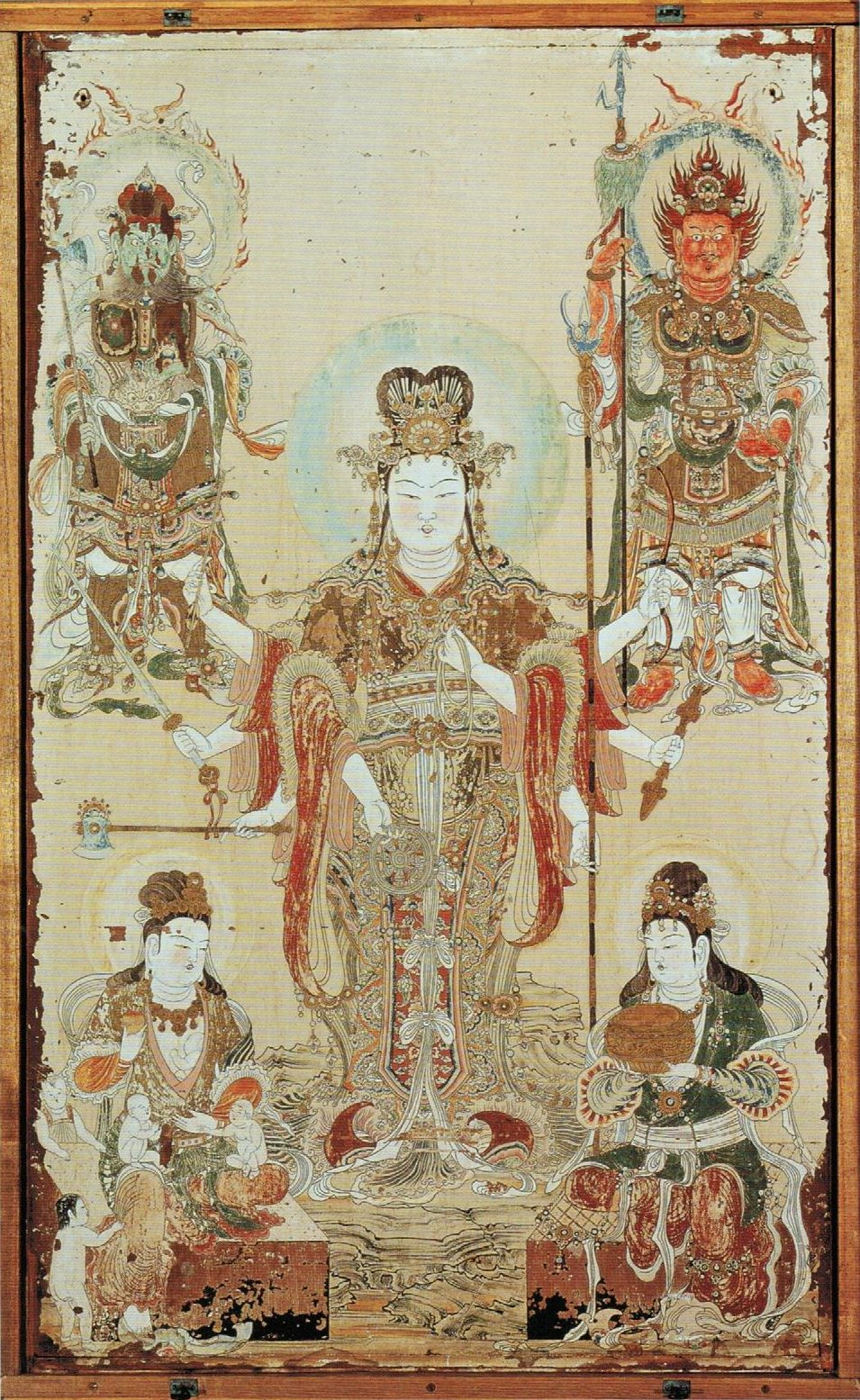
Eight-armed Sarasvatī surrounded by the goddesses Hariti and Prithvi and two divine generals (c. 1212).

A key message of the sutra is that the Four Heavenly Kings (Sanskrit: caturmahārājas, Chinese: 四大天王; pinyin: Sì Dàtiānwáng) and other devas protect the ruler who is faithful to the Golden Light Sutra, worships it and lives virtuously, governing his country in a proper manner. In particular, a ruler who honors and protects the preachers of the sutra and sponsors ritual recitations of the sutra will acquire divine protection and virtuous qualities. Preachers of the sutra themselves will also be protected by deities and become imbued with the powers of the Golden Light Sutra. This message of divine protection (especially of the preachers and supporters of the sutra) is key to several chapters (especially from chapter six to chapter eleven). These chapters are concerned with different deities who vow to uphold the sutra and grant protection along with numerous boons to those who preach and listen to this sutra. They include the goddesses Sarasvatī (Chinese: 大辨才天; pinyin: Dà Biàncáitiān, J: Benzaiten), Śrīmahādevī (Chinese: 大功德天; pinyin: Dà Gōngdétiān) and Prithvi who vow to protect any bhikṣu who will uphold and teach the sutra.

Chapter twelve is an important chapter which contains a verse treatise on kingship (called a "Contract for Divine Kings"). The versified treatise explains that divine kings are only granted the quality of divinity by the devas, as long as he rules in accordance with the Buddha's Dharma. This idea is further supported by a story of the Buddha's past life as a Dharma protecting king in chapter thirteen. Chapter fourteen meanwhile explains how to listen to and recite the sutra, and includes some esoteric instructions on the process.

Further chapters extol the merits of the Golden Light Sutra through various stories and Jataka tales of the Buddha's past lives. The power of the sutra is said to encompass not just divine protection, but also a path to Buddhahood itself. This is because the sutra is itself said to be one with the Buddha's Dharma-body.

=== In East Asia ===
The Golden Light Sutra became one of the most important sutras in East Asian Buddhism due to its apotropaic, protective and purificatory qualities. The sutra was said to save people from being reborn in hell realms and to protect a country from disasters.

During China's Sui dynasty (581–618), the eminent patriarch of the Tiantai tradition, Zhiyi (538–597 ce), wrote influential commentaries on the Golden Light, including the Jin guangming jing xuanyi (金光明經玄義; Profound Meaning of the Sūtra of Golden Light; T. 1783) and Jin guangming jing wenju (金光明經文句; Exegesis of the Sūtra of Golden Light; T. 1785). Zhiyi also initiated a ritual ceremony known as Gongfo Zhaitian (供佛齋天, "Puja of Offering to the Buddhas and the Devas"), based on the sutra. During the ceremony, offerings are made to the Buddhas as well as the twenty-four devas as a sign of respect. This ceremony has been carried down through tradition into modern times and is customarily performed in Chinese Buddhist temples on the 9th day of the 1st month of the Chinese calendar. Another important ritual ceremony developed by Zhiyi was the "Rite for the Golden-Light Repentance" (Jin guangming chanfa 金光明懺法). Zhiyi also developed a life release rite based on the sutra. Later Tiantai revivalists like Zunshi (遵 式; 964–1032) and Siming Zhili (知禮; 960–1028) promoted new versions of these rites. Zhili also wrote sub-commentaries on Zhiyi's Golden Light commentaries.

The Golden Light soon came to be seen as an important text for protecting an entire country in East Asia, and often was read publicly to ward off threats. The Golden Light was translated not just into the major Buddhist languages of Chinese and Tibetan but also into Uighur, Mongol, Sogdian, Khotanese, and Tangut. Many manuscripts of the sutra have survived in different regions. Yijing (635-713) was influential in popularising the Golden Light Sutra. His translation became the basis for later translations into Tibetan, Uighur, Sogdian and Tangut editions.

The Golden Light Sutra ritual tradition also influenced Tendai Buddhist ritual culture in Japan. The first reading of the Golden Light in Japan was at a court ceremony during around 660 CE, when the Tang dynasty of China and Silla of Korea defeated the state of Baekje of Korea and were threatening Japan. In 741 Emperor Shōmu of Japan founded provincial monasteries for monks (国分寺) and nuns (国分尼寺) in each province. The official name of the monasteries was the Temple for Protection of the State by the Four Heavenly Kings Golden Light Sutra (traditional Chinese: 金光明經四天王護国之寺). The 20 monks who lived there recited the Sovereign Kings Golden Light Sutra on a fixed schedule to protect the country.

== Textual history ==
A Sanskrit edition of the sutra exists, it was first edited by S. C. Das and S. C. Shastri in 1898 (Calcutta). This was followed by a new edition by B. Nanjio and H. Idzumi (Japan, 1931). It was further studied and edited by Johannes Nobel (1937) on the basis of a Nepalese manuscript. Various other Sanskrit fragments (up to 80) have also been found. The Sanskrit text was translated into English by Emmerick (1970).

The Golden Light is mentioned in numerous Indic works (three tantras and ten commentaries) as an important text for ritual recitation. Various other Buddhist texts mention it as an important text to be recited, including Śāntideva’s Śikṣāsamuccaya. The Golden Light also remains a key ritual text in Newar Buddhism, where it is one of the "nine Dharmas", the central Mahayana sutras in the tradition.

The Golden Light Sutra has been translated into Chinese, Saka ("Khotanese"), Old Uyghur by Shingqo Sheli Tutung, Tangut, Classical Tibetan, Mongolian, Manchu, Korean and Japanese.

=== Chinese ===
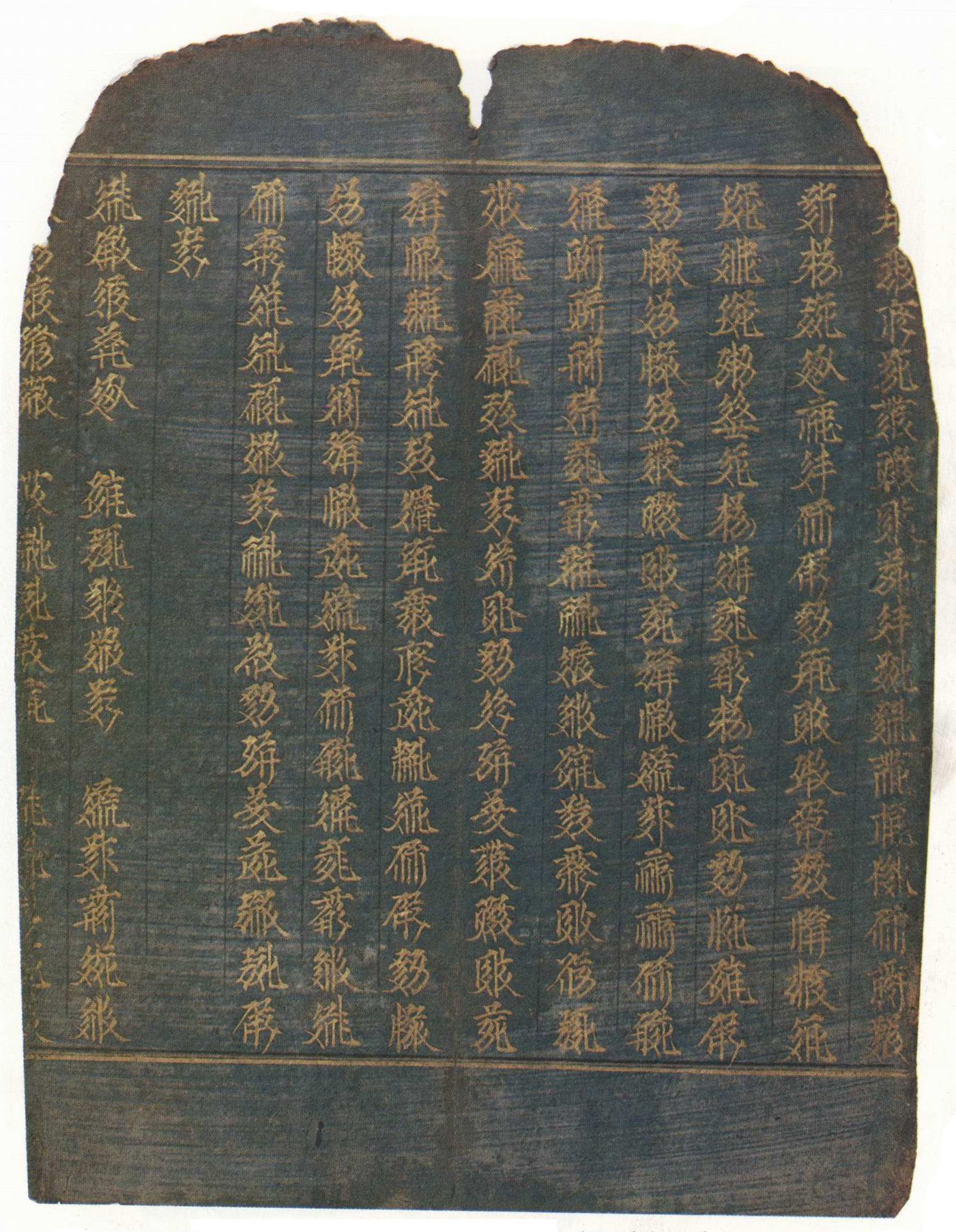
11th~13th century, chrysographic Tangut version

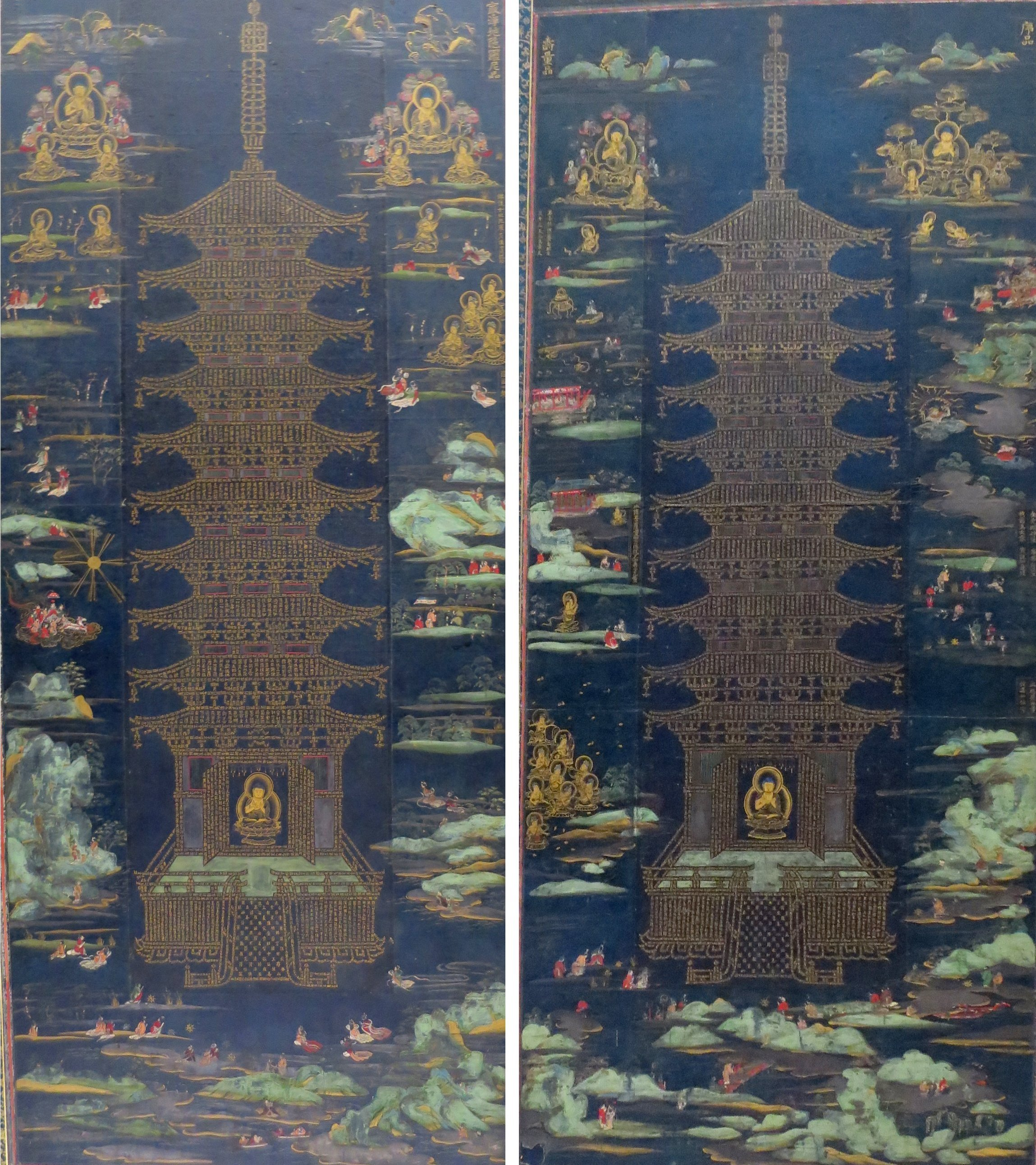
Jeweled pagoda mandala from a copy of the Golden Light Sutra. Japan, Heian period, 12th century.

Three canonical Chinese translations have survived:

- Jin guangming jin (金光明經, Golden Light Sutra T663) translated by Dharmakṣema (385–433)
- Hebu jin guangming (合部金光明經, Collated Sūtra of Golden Light T664), a synoptic edition by Baogui (寶貴) c. 597 which supplements T663 with two other translations attributed to Paramārtha and Jñānagupta.
- Jin guangming zuisheng wang jin (金光明最勝王經, Most Victorious King of Golden Light Sūtra; T665), translated by Yijing (635–713). This thirty one chapter version became the most popular edition in East Asian Buddhism.

An extracanonical version, ascribed to Paramārtha, (499–569) is extant in a Japanese manuscript.

=== Japanese ===
One of the earliest Japanese annotations was an 8th-century kunten translation of the Yijing Chinese translation housed in Saidaiji Temple.

In 1933, Izumi published the first complete Japanese translation directly from Sanskrit, followed by another translation by Ama a year later.

=== Tibetan ===
There are at least three main canonical Tibetan translations which reflect the growth of the sutra over time:

1. The twenty-one-chapter version (Tib. I): 'Phags pa gser 'od dam pa mdo sde'i dbang po'i rgyal po zhes bya ba theg pa chen po'i mdo D557/Q176. Attributed to the reign of King Khri lde btsug brtan (705–755), this is the oldest Tibetan rendering. It is relatively concise and aligns closely with the extant Sanskrit text.
2. The twenty-nine-chapter version (Tib. II): 'Phags pa gser 'od dam pa mdo sde'i dbang po'i rgyal po zhes bya ba theg pa chen po'i mdo D556/Q175, translated from Sanskrit by Jinamitra, Śīlêndrabodhi, and Ye shes sde. Translated during the reign of King Ral pa can (804–816) by the scholars Jinamitra, Silendrabodhi, and Ye shes sde. This version effectively doubled the length of the sutra by incorporating expansive chapters on Mahayana philosophy, including the Trikaya (three bodies of Buddha) and the ten stages of the bodhisattva.
3. The thirty-one chapter version (Tib. III): 'Phags pa gser 'od dam pa mchog tu rnam par rgyal ba'i mdo sde'i rgyal po theg pa chen po'i mdo D555/Q174. A translation of the Chinese version by the monk Yijing (d. 713) by Chos grub.

The historical timeline of the sutra is supported by significant manuscript discoveries in the 20th century. Archeological expeditions in Dunhuang uncovered numerous fragments of the sutra. These caches contain abundant fragments of the archaic Tib. I but none of the expanded Tib. II. As Tib. II offered a more refined translation and a broader philosophical scope, it gradually rendered Tib. I obsolete in the eyes of monastic editors. As such, many later editions of the Tibetan Canon, such as the black Narthang block print, omitted the short earlier version entirely, viewing it as a redundant subset of the expanded text.

=== Old Turkic ===
An almost complete translation of the Golden Light Sutra into Old Uyghur in the 11th century was carried out by the scribe Shingqo Sheli Tutung. This particular translation would be revised two times by Uyghur and Yugur monks, in 1361 and 1687 respectively.

=== Western languages ===
In 1958, Nobel published a German translation, based on Yijing's Chinese text.

In 1970, R. E. Emmerick produced an English translation of the short, condensed Sanskrit version of the Sutra of Golden Light into English.

In 2007, the Foundation for the Preservation of the Mahayana Tradition, Lama Zopa Rinpoche's Buddhist organization, produced a translation of the 21 chapter version of the Tibetan translation, the most abbreviated and condensed version. In 2023, 84000.co published a translation of the 21 chapter version, followed in 2024 by the first English translations of the 29 and 31 chapter versions.

=== Commentaries ===
Various commentaries on the sutra were composed in China, including:

- Profound Meaning of the Golden Light Sūtra (金光明經玄義; Jīnguāngmíng Jīng Xuányì, T 1783) by Zhiyi (transcribed by Guanding)
- Textual Commentary on the Golden Light Sūtra (金光明經文句; Jīnguāngmíng Jīng Wénjù, T 1785) by Zhiyi (transcribed by Guanding)
- Commentary on the Sovereign Scripture of the Sublimely Victorious Golden Light (金光明最勝王經疏 T 1788) by Huizhao 慧沼
- Commentary on the Golden Light Sūtra (金光明經疏 T 1787) by Jizang 吉藏
- A commentary by Paramartha (499–569) which only survives in fragments

== See also ==
- Humane King Sutra
- Lotus Sutra

== Bibliography ==
- Bagchi, S. ed. (1967). Suvarṇaprabhāsasūtram (Sanskrit source text), Darbhanga: The Mithila Institute. Digital Sanskrit Buddhist Canon. (NB: in Unicode)
- Emmerick, R. E. (1970). The Sūtra of Golden Light: Being a Translation of the Suvarṇabhāsottamasūtra. London, Luzac and Company Ltd. ISBN 978-0-7189-0479-1; 9780718904791
- Gummer, Natalie D. (2012). Listening to the Dharmabhāṇaka: The Buddhist Preacher in and of the Sūtra of Utmost Golden Radiance, Journal of the American Academy of Religion 80 (1), 137-160. (registration required)
- Lee, Sumi (2017). Kingship as "Dharma-Protector": A Comparative Study of Wŏnhyo and Huizhao's Views on the "Golden Light Sutra", Journal of Korean Religions 8 (1), 93-129 (registration required)
- Nobel, Johannes, ed. (1937). Suvarṇaprabhāsottamasūtra: Das Goldglanz-Sūtra; ein Sanskrittext des Mahāyāna-Buddhismus; nach den Handschriften und mit Hilfe der tibetischen und chinesischen Übertragungen. Leipzig: Otto Harrassowitz
- Skjaervo, Prods O. (2004 ). This Most Excellent Shine of Gold, King of Kings of Sutras: The Khotanese Suvarnabhãsottamasutra. 2 vols. Cambridge, MA: Department of Near Eastern Languages and Civilizations, Harvard University
- Suzuki, T. (2003). Stupa Worship and Dharma Evaluation in the Suvarnaprabhasa, Journal of Indian and Buddhist Studies 51 (2), 996-1001
- Tyomkin E. (1995). Unique Sanskrit Fragments of the "Sutra of Golden Light" in the manuscript collection of St Petersburg Branch of the Institute of Oriental Studies, Russian Academy of Sciences, Manuscripta Orientalia. Vol. 1, (1), 29-38.
