= Kahar Barat =

American historian

- Born: 1950 (age 75–76); Yili, Xinjiang, People's Republic of China

Academic work
- Main interests: Buddhism and Islam in Xinjiang

Kahar Barat (Chinese: 卡哈尔·巴拉提; born 1950) is a Uyghur American historian known for his work on Buddhism and Islam in Xinjiang.

Kahar Barat was born in Yili in 1950. He earned his M.A. degree in Turkology from the Central University for Ethnic Minorities (Minzu University of China) in Beijing; he received his Ph.D. from Harvard University in 1993. He later taught at Yale University and other institutions.

In 2000, Kahar Barat published an annotated English edition of parts of "The Uygur Turkic biography of the seventh-century Chinese Buddhist Pilgrim Xuanzang" originally written by Shingqo Sheli Tutung.

Barat's recent book, named Maymaq Uyghurlar ("Warped Uyghurs", in Uyghur) discusses the plight of Xinjiang's artists, who find themselves in the position of packaging the Uyghur culture for consumption by outside audiences.
