= Johannes Nobel =

German indologist and Buddhist scholar

- Born: 25 June 1887; Forst (Lausitz)
- Died: 22 October 1960 (aged 73)
- Citizenship: German
- Occupations: Indologist and Buddhist scholar

Johannes Nobel (25 June 1887 – 22 October 1960) was a German indologist and Buddhist scholar.

== Early life and education ==
Johannes Nobel was born on 25 June 1887 in Forst (Lausitz). He studied Indo-European languages, Arabic, Turkish and Sanskrit at the University of Greifswald from 1907, then from 1908 at the Friedrich Wilhelms University Berlin. In 1911 he completed his PhD thesis on the history of the Alamkãraśāstra, and decided to work as a librarian. In 1915 he passed the library examinations and found employment at the Old Royal Library in Berlin. In the First World War, Nobel joined the Landsturm and was temporarily employed by the Supreme Army Command as chief interpreter for Turkish.

== Academic career ==
In March 1920, Nobel joined the Preußische Staatsbibliothek as a librarian and in the same year, he successfully defended his habilitation thesis, a work on Indian poetics. He received his teaching qualification in Indian philology at the University of Berlin in 1921. At the same time, he learned Chinese, Tibetan and Japanese and devoted himself to the research in Buddhist Studies.

In 1927, Nobel was appointed extraordinary professor in Berlin. On 1 April 1928 he accepted a professorship for indology at the University of Marburg, which he held until his retirement in 1955. He did not try to ingratiate himself with national socialism, although he had, in November 1933, been one of the signers of the confession of professors at German universities and colleges to Adolf Hitler and the national socialist state. His successor on the Marburg chair was Wilhelm Rau; Claus Vogel is one of Nobel's Marburg pupils.

Nobel's extensive studies and critical editions of Suvaraprabhāsasūtra (Golden Light Sutra), one of the most important Mahāyāna sūtras, appeared between 1937 and 1958. In 1925, Nobel published the translation of the Amaruśataka by Friedrich Rückert.

Nobel's study book, his personal files and some unpublished manuscripts, including a corrected German version of his habilitation thesis, were discovered in his former institute in 2008.

== Selected publications ==
- Suvarabhāsottamasūtra. Das Goldglanz-Sūtra: ein Sanskrittext des Mahāyāna-Buddhismus. Nach den Handschriften und mit Hilfe der tibetischen und chinesischen Übertragungen hrsg. Leipzig: Harrassowitz, 1937
- Suvarnaprabhāsottamasūtra. Das Goldglanz-Sūtra: ein Sanskrittext des Mahāyāna-Buddhismus. Die tibetische Übersetzung mit einem Wörterbuch. Band 1: Tibetische Übersetzung, Stuttgart: Kohlhammer Verlag, 1944. Band 2: Wörterbuch Tibetisch-Deutsch-Sanskrit, Stuttgart: Kohlhammer Verlag, 1950
- Suvarnaprabhāsottamasūtra. Das Goldglanz-Sūtra: ein Sanskrittext des Mahāyāna-Buddhismus. I-Tsing's chinesische Version und ihre tibetische Übersetzung. Volume 1: I-Tsing's chinesische Version. Volume 2: Die tibetische Übersetzung. Leiden: Brill, 1958
- The Foundations of Indian Poetry and Their Historical Development. Calcutta 1925 (Calcutta Oriental Series, vol. 16)
- Udrāyana, König von Roruka, eine buddhistische Erzählung; Wiesbaden, O. Harrassowitz, 1955.

== Sources ==
- Bekenntnis der Professoren an den deutschen Universitäten und Hochschulen zu Adolf Hitler und dem nationalsozialistischen Staat. Überreicht vom National-sozialistischen Lehrerbund Deutschland/Gau Sachsen. 1933. p. 136.
- Dimitrov, Dragomir (7 September 2009). "Nachlaß Nobel". Universität Marburg, Indologie und Tibetologie. Archived from the original on 4 March 2016.
- Hanneder, Jürgen (2010). Indologie im Umbruch: zur Geschichte des Faches in Marburg 1845-1945. Indologica Marpurgensia. Vol. 1. München: Kirchheim. ISBN 978-3-87410-140-0.
- Nobel, Johannes (1911). Beiträge zur älteren Geschichte des Alaṃkāraśāstra (in German). Berlin: Schade.
- Nobel, Johannes (1925). The Foundations of Indian Poetry and Their Historical Development. Calcutta Oriental Series. Vol. 16. Calcutta: R N Seal.
- Rau, Wilhelm; Vogel, Claus (1959). "Johannes Nobel", in: Claus Vogel (ed.): Jñānamuktāvalī. Commemoration volume in honour of Johannes Nobel. On the occasion of his 70th birthday offered by pupils and colleagues. International Academy of Indian Culture, New Delhi (Sarasvati-Vihara, vol. 38), pp. 1–16
- Nobel, Johannes, ed. (1925). Die hundert Strophen des Amaru (in German). Translated by Rückert, Friedrich. Hannover: Lafaire.
