= Shingon Buddhism =

Tradition of Japanese Buddhism

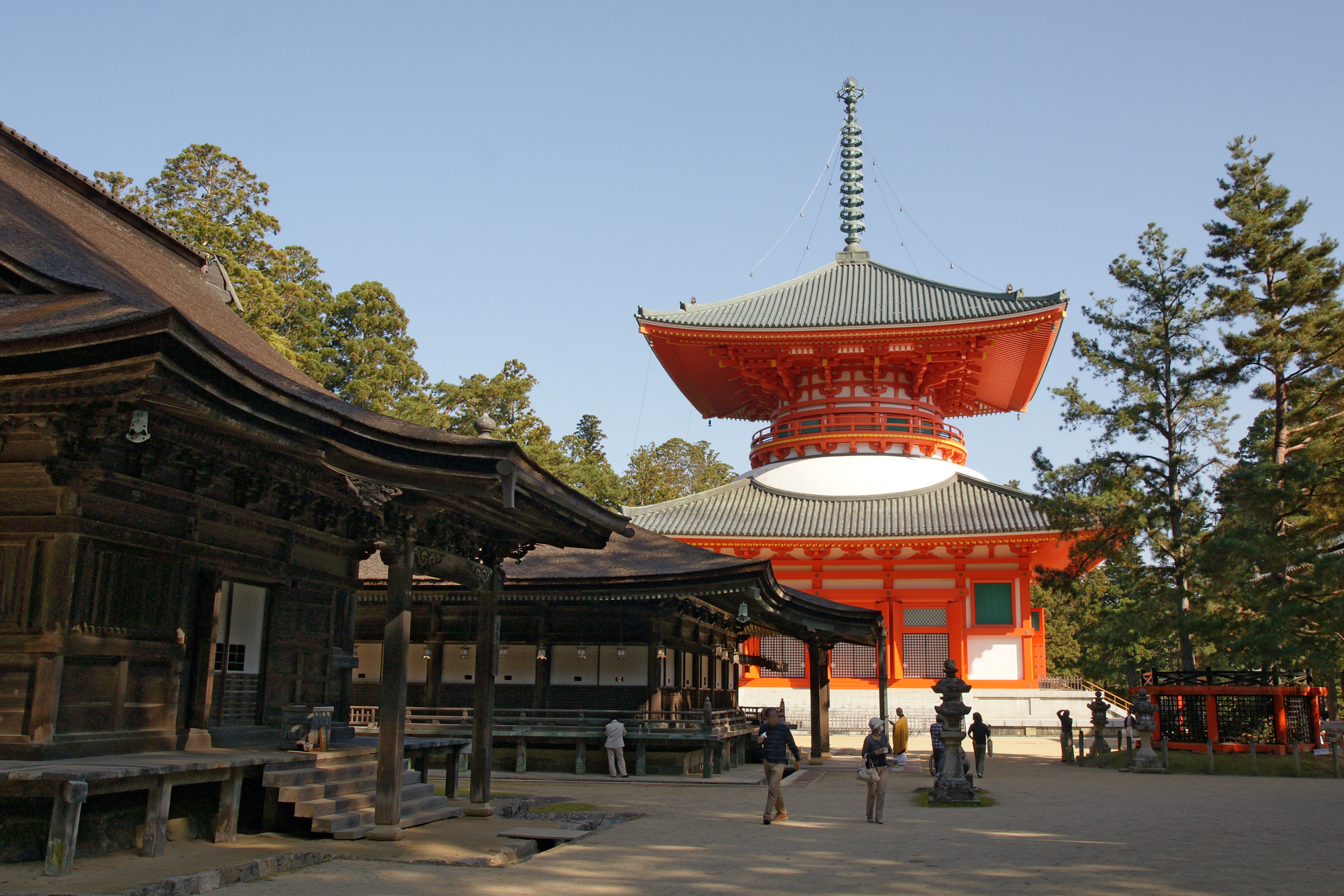
Danjō garan of Kongōbu-ji, the head temple of the Kōyasan sect based in Mount Kōya

Shingon (真言宗, Shingon-shū; "True Word/Mantra School") is one of the major schools of Buddhism in Japan and one of the few surviving Vajrayana lineages in East Asian Buddhism. It is a form of Japanese Esoteric Buddhism and is sometimes called "Tōmitsu" (東密 lit. "Esoteric [Buddhism] of Tō-ji"). The word shingon is the Japanese reading of the Chinese word 真言 (zhēnyán), which is the translation of the Sanskrit word mantra.

The Zhenyan lineage was founded in China (c. 7th–8th centuries) by Indian vajrācāryas (esoteric masters) like Śubhakarasiṃha, Vajrabodhi and Amoghavajra. These esoteric teachings would later flourish in Japan under the auspices of a Buddhist monk named Kūkai (空海, 774–835), who traveled to Tang China and received these esoteric transmissions from a Chinese master named Huiguo (746–805). Kūkai established his tradition at Mount Kōya (in Wakayama Prefecture), which remains the central pilgrimage center of Shingon Buddhism.

The practice of the Shingon school stresses that one is able to attain "buddhahood in this very body" (即身成佛, sokushin jōbutsu) through its practices, especially those which make use of the "three mysteries" (三密, sanmitsu) of mudra, mantra and mandala. Another influential doctrine introduced by Shingon was the idea that all beings are originally enlightened (本覺, hongaku).

The Shingon school's teachings and rituals had an influence on other Japanese traditions, especially those of the Tendai school, as well as Shugendo and Shinto. Its teachings also influenced the ritual repertoire of Japanese Zen, including Soto Zen (through the monk Keizan). Shingon Buddhism also influenced broader Japanese culture, including medieval Japanese aesthetics, art, and craftsmanship.

== History ==
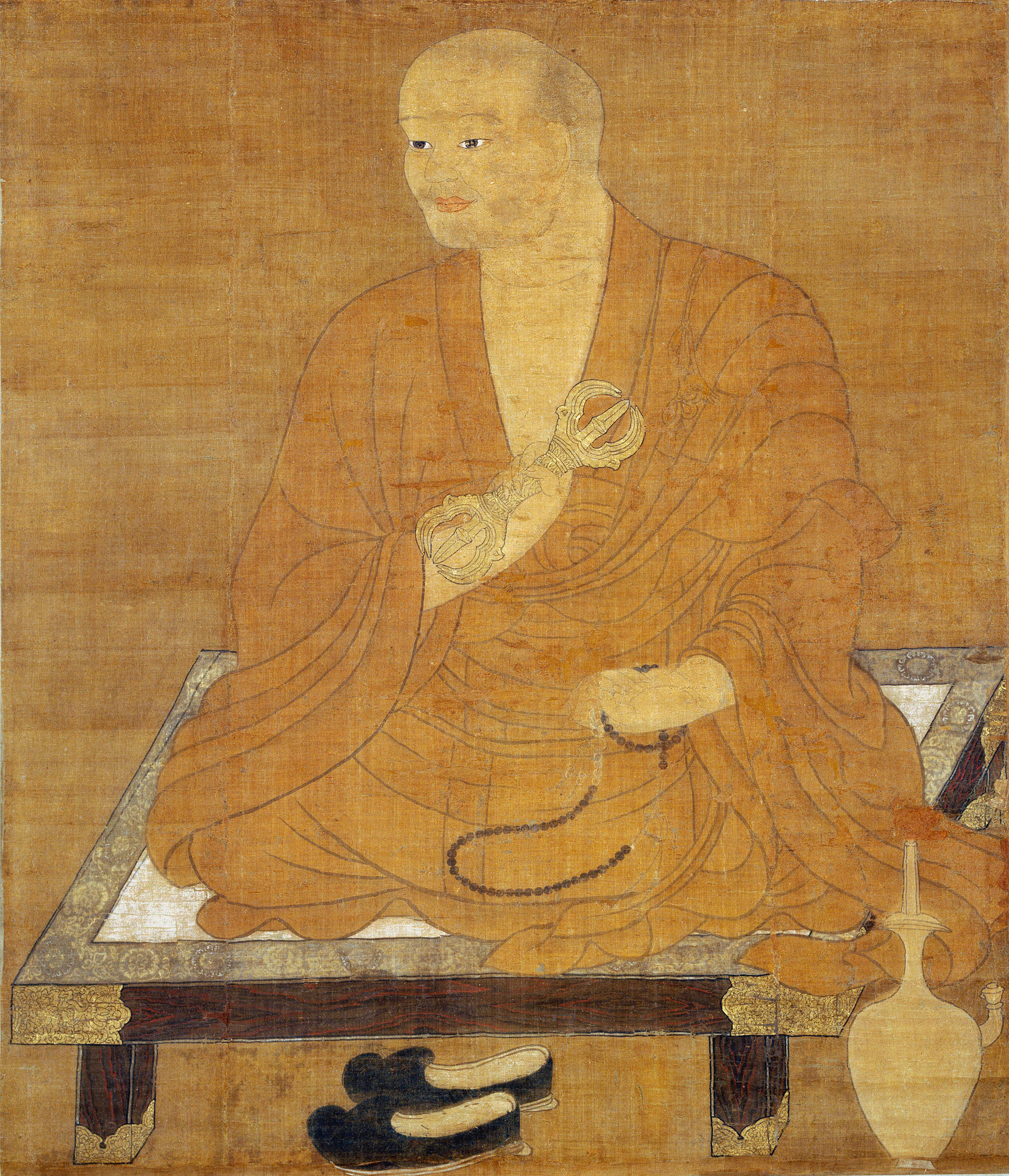
Painting of Kūkai from a set of scrolls depicting the first eight patriarchs of the Shingon school. Japan, Kamakura period (13th–14th centuries).

Shingon Buddhism was founded in the Heian period (794–1185) by a Japanese Buddhist monk named Kūkai (774–835 CE) who traveled to China in 804 to study Esoteric Buddhist practices in the city of Xi'an (西安), then called Chang-an, at Qinglong Temple (青龍寺) under Huiguo, a student of the Indian esoteric master Amoghavajra. Kūkai returned to Japan with the teachings and scriptures of Chinese Esoteric Buddhism which became immediately influential with the island's elites and eventually coalesced into an institutionalized tradition in Japanese Buddhism. Shingon followers usually refer to Kūkai as Kōbō-Daishi (弘法大師, Great Master of the Propagation of Dharma) or Odaishi-sama (お大師様, The Great Master), the posthumous name given to him years after his death by Emperor Daigo.

=== Kūkai's early days and visit to China ===
Kūkai was born to a family of the aristocratic Saeki clan in Shikoku and received a classical Confucian education at Kyoto's college. He converted to Buddhism in his 20s and was inspired to practice asceticism in the mountains and wander the countryside as an ascetic hermit (though he also visited cities to study texts). During this time his main meditation was the mantra of bodhisattva Ākāśagarbha found in the Ākāśagarbha Memory-Retention Practice (虛空藏求聞持法, Kokūzō-gumonji-hō; Taishō no.1145). While he was practicing in the mountains, he had a vision of the bodhisattva flying at him.

During this early period of intense study, prayer and practice, Kūkai sought the highest truth to be found in Buddhism. One day he dreamt of a man telling him to seek out the Mahāvairocana Sūtra. He was able to obtain a copy in Chinese (and Sanskrit) but large portions of the text were undecipherable to him and thus he decided to go to China to find someone who could explain it to him.

In 804, Kūkai set sail on a fleet of four ships to China. The future Tendai founder Saichō was on the same fleet. When Kūkai first met Huiguo (a student of Amoghavajra) on the fifth month of 805, Huiguo was sixty and on the verge of death. Huiguo exclaimed to Kūkai that he had been waiting for him and immediately initiated him into the esoteric mandalas. In the short space of three months, Huiguo initiated and taught Kūkai everything he knew on the doctrines and practices of esoteric Buddhism. During this time Kūkai also learned Sanskrit from some Indian masters living in China.

=== Kūkai's return ===
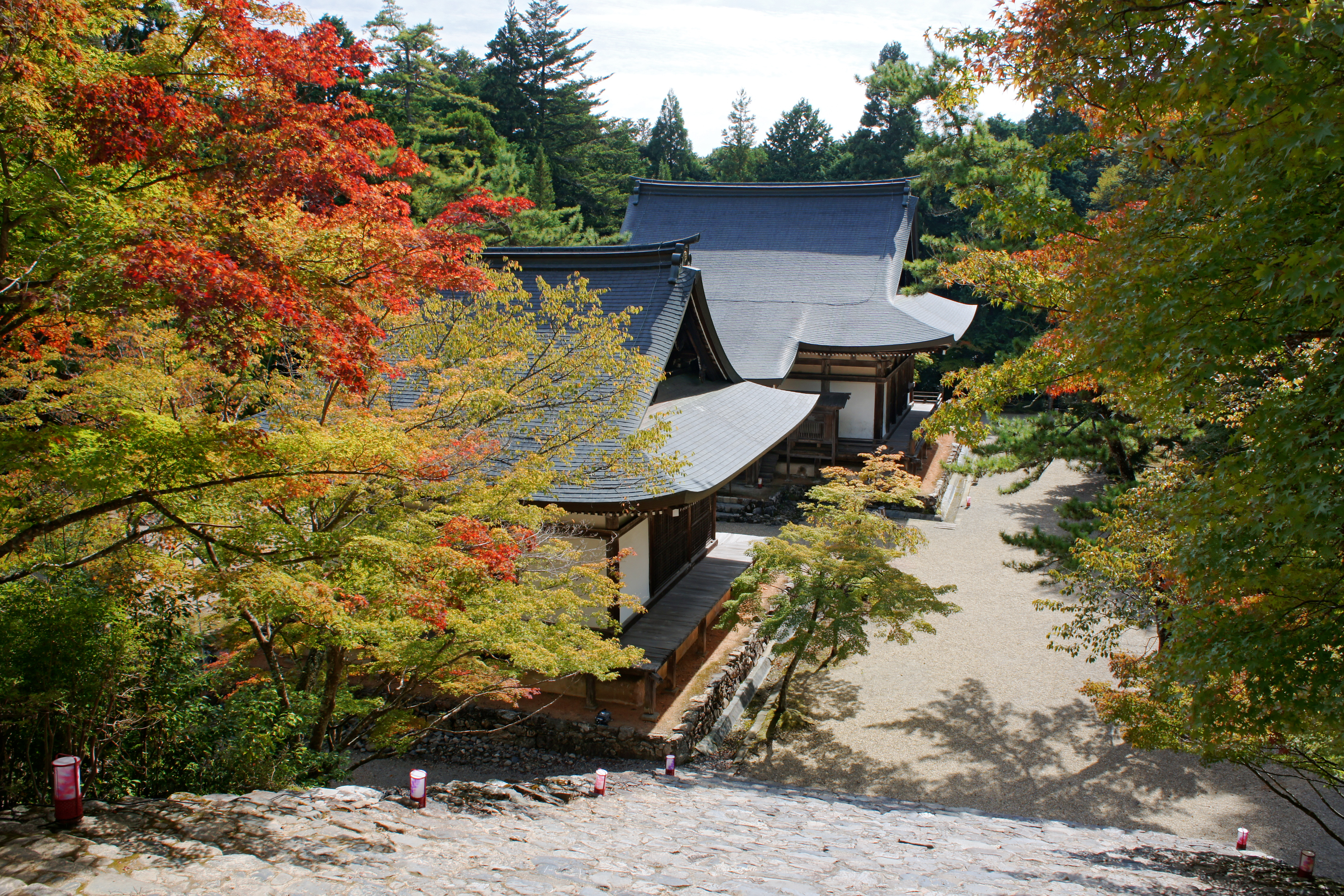
Jingo-ji, on Mount Takao, the first major temple in which Kūkai worked on his return to Japan

Kūkai returned to Japan after Huiguo's death in 806. He brought back numerous Buddhist texts, mandalas, ritual items and other books. After returning, Kūkai asked the imperial court for permission to establish a new Buddhist school and waited three years for a response in Kyushu. In 809 Kūkai was allowed to reside at a temple near Kyoto known as Takaosanji (now Jingo-ji). This temple would become his major center of operations near the capital. Kūkai's fortunes rose steadily when Emperor Saga became his patron and Kūkai was appointed as the head of Todai-ji in 810. Kūkai began to give esoteric initiations (abhiśeka) at this time, including to elite laymen and to Saicho and his students. He also began to organize a new school of esoteric Buddhism centered around Jingo-ji and wrote some key works which outlined the main teachings of Shingon.

In 818, Kūkai asked emperor Saga to grant him Mount Kōya (高野山, Kōyasan), in present-day Wakayama province, so that he could establish a true monastic center away from the disturbances of the capital and this was soon granted. Kūkai and his disciples soon began to build the new monastic complex, which they imagined and modeled on the two mandalas, the womb and vajra. This mountain center soon became the key center for Shingon study and practice. In his later life, Kūkai continued to actively promote the efficacy of Shingon ritual among the elite even while also working to build Kōyasan into a major center. Kūkai eventually achieved control of Tō-ji for the Shingon school, which was a major temple within the capital. His final request before his death in 832 was to construct a Shingon hall in Imperial palace grounds in order to accommodate the practice of the seven day ritual of chanting the Sutra of Golden Light. His request was eventually granted, a year after his death.

=== After Kūkai ===
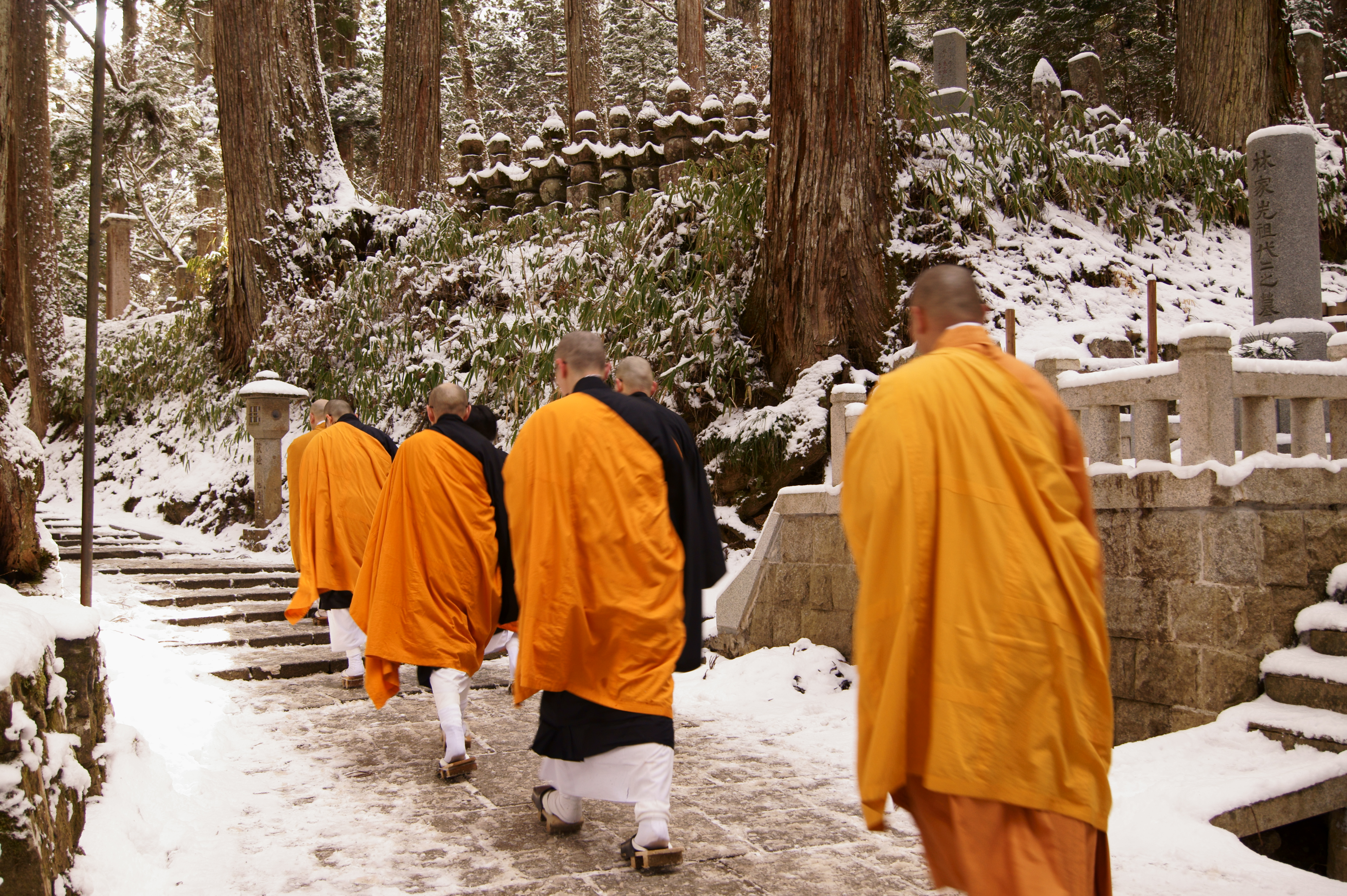
Shingon monks at Mount Koya

After Kūkai, the main Shingon temples were taken over by key disciples like Jitsue, Shinzen, Shinzai, Eon and Shōhō. The main leadership after his death was Shinnen (804–891) and already at this time there was some conflict between Tō-ji and Kōyasan. Some Shingon monks also followed in Kūkai's footsteps and visited China to receive more teachings and texts. Likewise, several Tendai monks also visited China and brought back esoteric teachings, making Tendai esotericism a major competitor to Shingon.

Under Kangen (853–925), Tō-ji temple rose to become the head temple of Shingon. Mount Kōya experienced a period of decline afterwards, until it recovered in the 11th century through the support of Fujiwara clan nobles like Fujiwara no Michinaga.

Shingon Buddhism enjoyed immense popularity during the Heian period (平安時代), particularly among the nobility, and contributed greatly to the art and literature of the time, influencing other communities such as the Tendai school.

During the late Heian, Pure Land Buddhism was becoming very popular and Shingon was also influenced by this popular devotional trend. Mount Kōya soon became the center for groups of wandering holy men called Kōya Hijiri, who merged Pure Land practices focused on Amida Buddha with devotion to Kūkai and were also involved in raising funds for the rebuilding of many temples. Kōya-san soon became a major center for pilgrimage for all Japanese.

The Shingon monk Kakuban (1095–1143) was one Shingon scholar who responded to the rise in Pure Land devotionalism. He studied Shingon along with Tendai and also incorporated Pure Land practice into his Shingon system, as well as promoting an esoteric interpretation of nembutsu and Pure Land. Unlike other Pure Land schools, Kakuban held that the Pure Land exists in this very world and he also taught that Vairocana is Amida.

Kakuban, and his faction of priests centered at the Denbō-in (伝法院) soon came into conflict with the leadership at Kongōbu-ji, the head temple at Mount Kōya. Through his connections with high-ranking nobles in Kyoto, Kakuban was appointed abbot of Mount Kōya. The leadership at Kongōbu-ji opposed him and after several conflicts (some of which involved the burning down of temples of Kakuban's faction), Kakuban's group left the mountain for Mount Negoro to the northwest, where they constructed a new temple complex now known as Negoro-ji (根来寺).

After the death of Kakuban in 1143, attempts to make peace were unsuccessful and after further conflicts, the Negoro faction (led by Raiyu) founded the new Shingi Shingon School based on Kakuban's teachings. As such, Shingon became divided into two major sub-schools, Kogi Shingon (古義真言宗, Ancient Shingon school), and Shingi Shingon (新義真言宗, Reformed Shingon school). Over time, the two Shingon sub-schools also diverged doctrinally on such issues as the attainment of buddhahood through a single mantra and the theory of how the Dharmakāya teaches the Dharma.

Following in Kakuban's footsteps, the Koyasan monk Dōhan 道範 (1179–1252) has been seen as a key figure in the promotion of what has been called an “esoteric Pure Land culture”, a Shingon variety of Pure Land Buddhism that became very popular during this period and influenced other figures and schools like Eison of Saidaiji's Shingon Risshu. This esoteric pure land culture included esoteric uses and interpretations of the nembutsu along with the popularization and use of the Mantra of Light.

During the Heian period, the adoption of Shinto deities into Buddhism became popular, something that became known as Shinbutsu-shūgō (神仏習合, "syncretism of kami and buddhas"). This movement saw local Japanese deities as manifestations of the Buddhas. For example Amaterasu was seen as an emanation of Vairocana in Shingon. This emanation theory was called honji suijaku by Buddhists. Major Shingon centers participated in this development, with key deities like Hachiman being worshipped at temples like Tō-ji for example.

Also during the Heian period, the syncretic religion of Shugendō started to develop and the influence of Shingon was one major element in its development. Shingon was especially influential on the Tōzan branch of Shugendō. which was centered on Mount Kinbu.

=== Kamakura to Sengoku period ===
The Kamakura period (1185 to 1333) saw the rise of another new Shingon tradition, the Shingon-risshū school. This new tradition stressed the importance of keeping the monastic Vinaya, along with esoteric practice. It was promoted by figures like Shunjō (1166–1227) and Eison (叡尊 1201–1290) and centered around Saidai-ji. Ninshō carried on the work of this tradition, which was known for its many public works projects, including building hospitals, hostels for the poor and animal sanctuaries.

Also during this period, many followers of the Ji sect founded by Ippen (1234–1289) made Kōya-san their home, joining with the Kōya hiriji groups, and many halls for Amida centered Pure Land practice were built on the mountain.

During the Muromachi period (1336 to 1573), the Shingon schools continued to develop, some under the support of elite families or even emperors, like Go-Uda (1267–1324), who entered the priesthood at Tō-ji and helped revitalize the temple as well as Daikaku-ji. Meanwhile, on Kōyasan, Yūkai (1345–1416) was responsible for revitalizing Shingon doctrinal study and also for driving away all of the nembutsu hiriji (now mostly following the Ji sect) who had been living on the mountain. He also purged the tradition of all traces of the heterodox Tachikawa school (even burning their texts). The Tachikawa school was known for teaching a mixed form of esotericism which made use of Daoist and sexual practices.

During the war torn Sengoku period (1467 to 1615), all the Shingon temples in or near the capital were destroyed or stripped of all lands, while the Shingon centers in the mountains like Kōya and Negoro were forced to raise militaries for self defense, though sometimes they used these forces to attempt to expand the lands holdings of their temples. Mount Negoro, the center of Shingi Shingon, was sacked by the daimyō Toyotomi Hideyoshi (豊臣秀吉) in 1585. After this show of force, Kōyasan, the last major Shingon temple left standing at this time, submitted to Hideyoshi, and was spared destruction.

=== Edo period ===
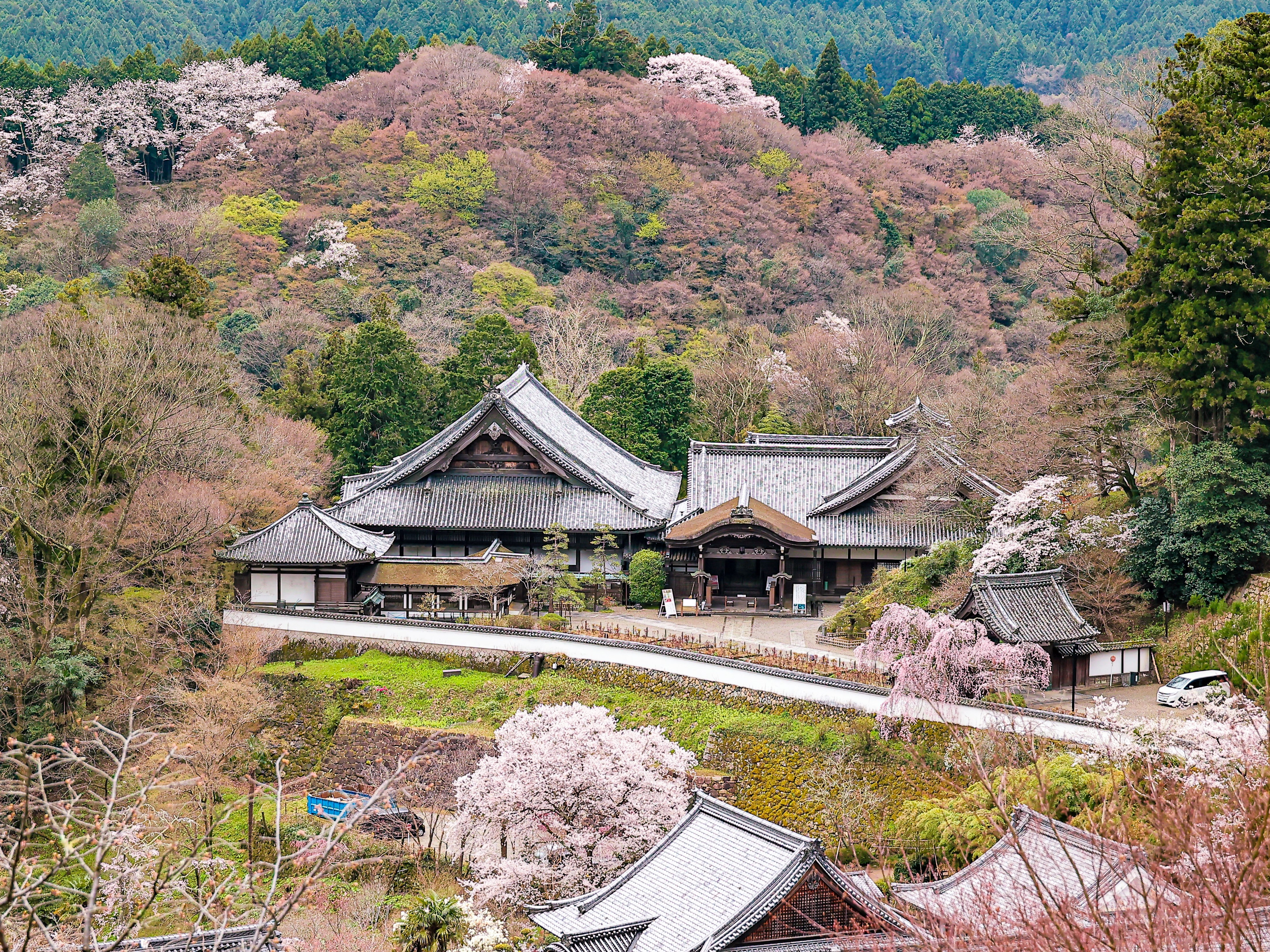
Office of Hase-dera in spring

During the Edo period (1603–1868), the Shingi Shingon monks from Mount Negoro had escaped and took their lineages elsewhere, eventually founding new schools at Hase-dera (the Buzan school) and at Chishaku (the Chisan-ha school). In the Edo period, the Tokugawa Shogunate implemented new religious control measures for the Buddhist community. Tokugawa Ieyasu issued regulations for the Shingon school in 1615, incorporating it into its administrative temple system. Under this new peace, Shingon study was revived in the various temples. Hase-dera became a major center for the broad study of all of Buddhism and also of secular topics. Meanwhile in Kōyasan, the Ji sect hiriji were allowed to return and were incorporated into the Shingon school, though this would lead to conflict later on.

During this period, monks like Jōgen and Onkō (1718–1804) focused on studying and promoting Buddhist precepts and monastic discipline. This renewed interest in precepts study was likely a response to Confucian critiques of Buddhism at the time. Onkō was also a well known scholar of Sanskrit.

=== Meiji period ===
After the Meiji Restoration (1868), the state forced a separation of Shinto and Buddhism (shinbutsu bunri) and abolished the Chokusai Hōe (Imperial Rituals). The Shingon school was significantly affected by these changes (since it was closely connected with many Shinto shrines), as well as by the Meiji era anti-buddhist persecutions known as haibutsu kishaku (abolish Buddhism and destroy Shākyamuni). Some Shingon temples that were affiliated with Shintō shrines were converted into shrines. Some Shinto monks left the Buddhist priesthood to become Shintō priests, or they returned to secular life. The government enforced the confiscation of temple land and this led to the closure of many Shingon temples. Those who survived had to turn to the regular population for support.

During the Meiji period, the government also adopted the "one sect, one leader" rule which forced all Shingon schools to merge under a single leader which was called a "Chōja" (Superintendent). This led to some internal political conflict among the various sub-schools of Shingon, some of which attempted to form their own separate official sects. Some of these eventually succeeded in attaining independence and eventually the unified Shingon sect split into various sub-sects again.

=== 20th century and post-war period ===
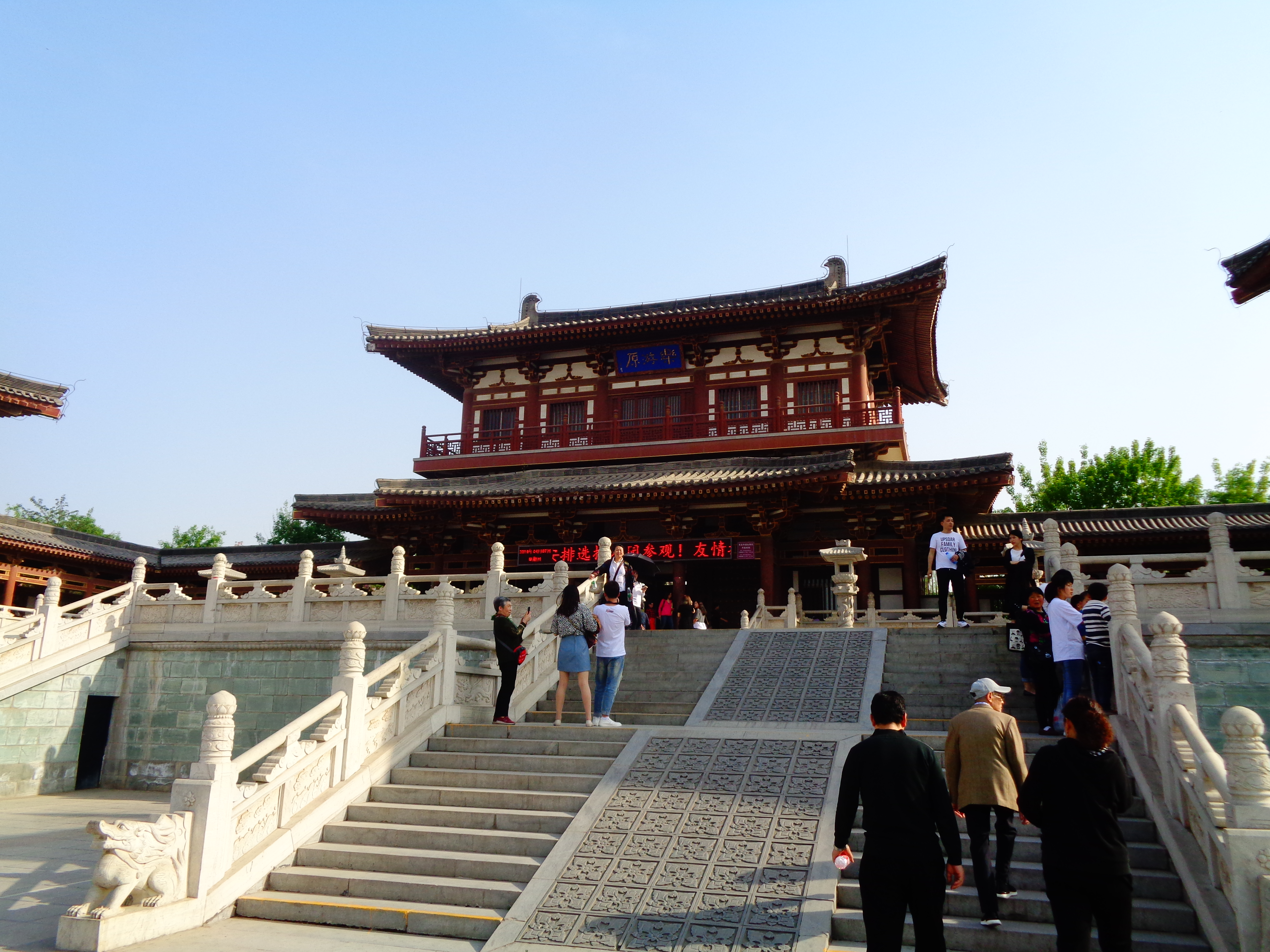
Qinglong Temple (青龍寺; Qīnglóng Sì; lit. 'Green Dragon Temple') in Xi'an. It is the temple where Huigo transmitted Shingon to Kukai. It has recently seen a revival of Chinese esotericism, based partly on Japanese Shingon.

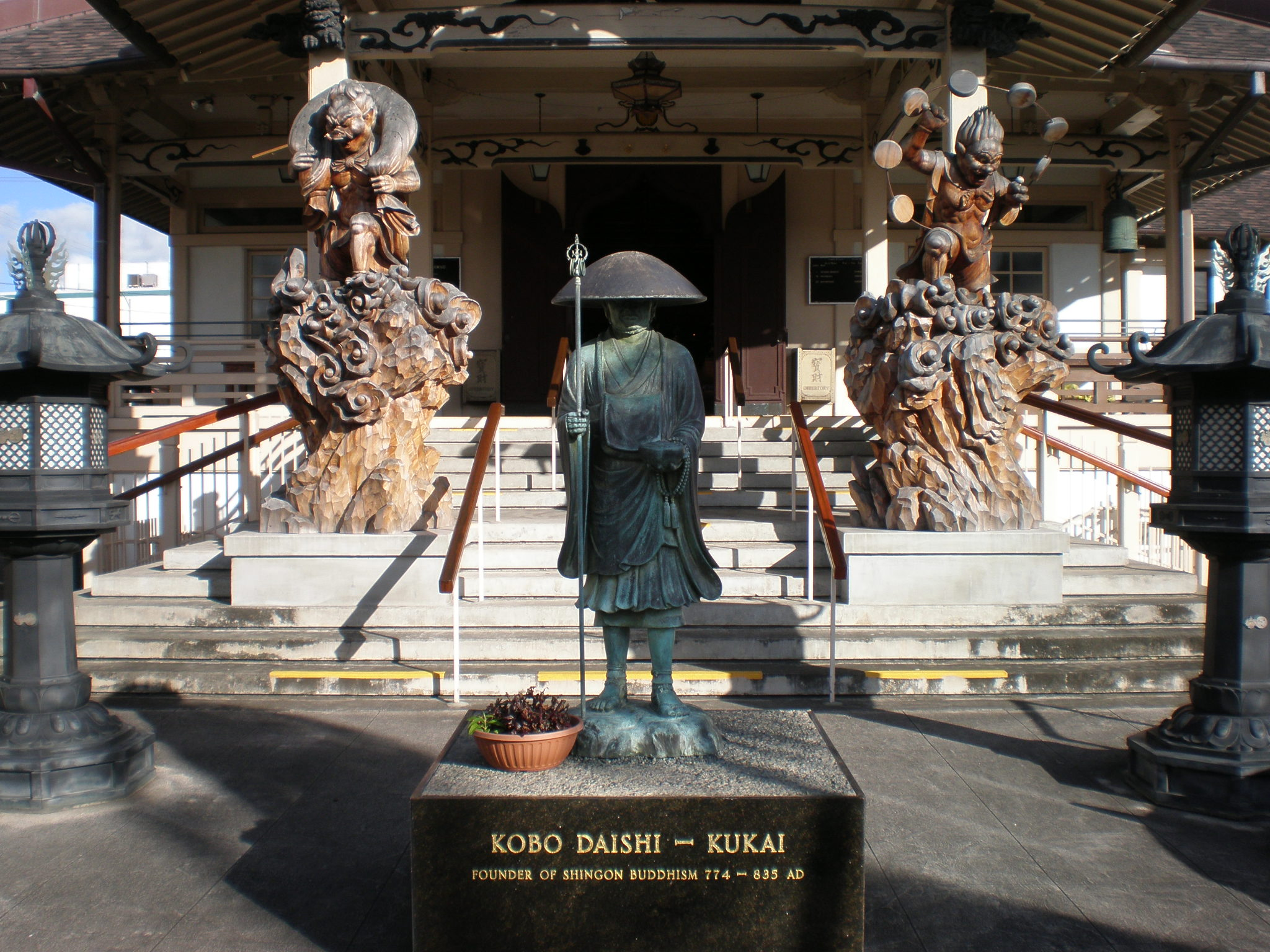
Entrance to the Shingon Mission in Honolulu

In March 1941, under the government's religious policy, Shingon schools were forcibly merged to form the 'Dai-Shingon' sect. During the second world war, prayers for the surrender of enemy nations were frequently held at various temples. After the war, both Ko-Gyō and Shin-Gyō schools continued to separate, and some established their own unique doctrines and traditions. There are now around eighteen major Shingon schools with their own headquarter temples (honzan) in Japan. Yamasaki estimated the number of Shingon followers at ten million and the number of priests at sixteen thousand in around eleven thousand temples (in his 1988 book). In Japan, there are also several new Shingon influenced groups classified as 'New Religions'. Some of these new movements include Shinnyo-en, Agon-shu and Gedatsu-kai.

Another recent modern development is the phenomenon of Chinese students reviving Chinese Esoteric Buddhism through studying Japanese Shingon. This “tantric revival movement” (mijiao fuxing yundong 密教復興運動) was mainly propagated by Chinese Buddhists who traveled to Japan to be trained, initiated, and receive dharma transmission as acharyas in the Shingon tradition and who then return home to establish the tradition. Some important figures of this revival include Wang Hongyuan 王弘願 (1876–1937), and Chisong 持松 both trained in Shingon and went on to spread Shingon teachings in the Chinese speaking world.

Some of these Chinese acharyas have chosen to officially remain under the oversight of Kōyasan Shingon-shū or Shingon-shu Buzan-ha and minister as Chinese branches of Japanese Shingon, but others have chosen to create independent and distinct schools. Today, these revivalist lineages exist in Hong Kong, Taiwan and Malaysia. Though they draw mainly from Shingon teachings, they have also adopted some Tibetan Buddhist elements.

A similar phenomenon has occurred in South Korea, where two recent esoteric schools have been founded, the Chinŏn (眞言) and the Jingak Order (眞 覺), both of which are largely based on Shingon teachings.

During the 20th century, Shingon Buddhism also spread to the West, especially to the United States (a move led by the Japanese Diaspora). There are now various temples on the West Coast and Hawaii like Hawaii Shingon Mission (built 1915–1918) and Koyasan Beikoku Betsuin (Los Angeles, founded 1912), Henjyoji Shingon Temple in Portland, Oregon (est. 1949), and the Seattle Koyasan Temple in Seattle, Washington.

== Doctrines ==
=== Sources ===
The teachings of Shingon are based on Mahayana texts, and early Buddhist tantras. The key esoteric sources are the Mahāvairocana Sūtra (大日経, Dainichi-kyō), the Vajraśekhara Sūtra (金剛頂経, Kongōchō-kyō), and the Susiddhikara Sūtra (蘇悉地経, Soshitsuji-kyō). Important Mahayana sutras in Shingon include the Lotus Sutra, the Brahmajāla Sūtra and Heart Sutra. Kūkai wrote commentaries on all three.

Shingon derives from the early period of Indian Vajrayana (then known as Mantrayana, the Vehicle of Mantras). Unlike Tibetan Buddhism, which focuses on the Anuttarayoga Tantras, which are tantras that arose at a later date of Indian Buddhism, Shingon bases itself on earlier works like the Mahavairocana which generally lack the antinomian uses of sexual yoga, taboo substances and charnel ground imagery found in the later tantras. Nevertheless, the concept of "great bliss" (tairaku) and the transformation of desire (and other defilements) into wisdom is found in Shingon.

Another important sutra in Shingon is the Prajñāpāramitānaya-sūtra (Jp. Hannyarishukyō, Taishō vol. 8, no. 243). This is a late "tantric" Prajñaparamita sutra in 150 lines which was translated by Amoghavajra and which contains various verses and seed syllables which encapsulate the Prajñaparamita teaching. The Hannyarishukyō is used extensively in Shingon as part of daily recitation and ritual practice. The full Sanskrit title is Mahāsukhavajra-amoghasamaya-sūtra (Ch. Dale jingang bukong zhenshi sanmohe jing, Sutra of the Vow of Fulfilling the Great Perpetual Enjoyment and Benefiting All Sentient Beings Without Exception).

Another important source for the Shingon school is the Awakening of Faith and a commentary on it called the On the Interpretation of Mahāyāna (Shi Moheyan lun 釈摩訶衍論, Japanese: Shakumakaen-ron, Taisho no. 1668), which was traditionally attributed to Nagarjuna (though it is likely an East Asian composition).

Finally, the works of Kūkai are key sources in Shingon Buddhism, including his various commentaries on the key esoteric texts of Shingon as well as original works like his magnum opus, the ten volume Jūjū shinron (Treatise on Ten Levels of Mind) and the shorter summary Hizō hōyaku (Precious Key to the Secret Treasury).

=== The Dharmakaya Mahāvairocana ===
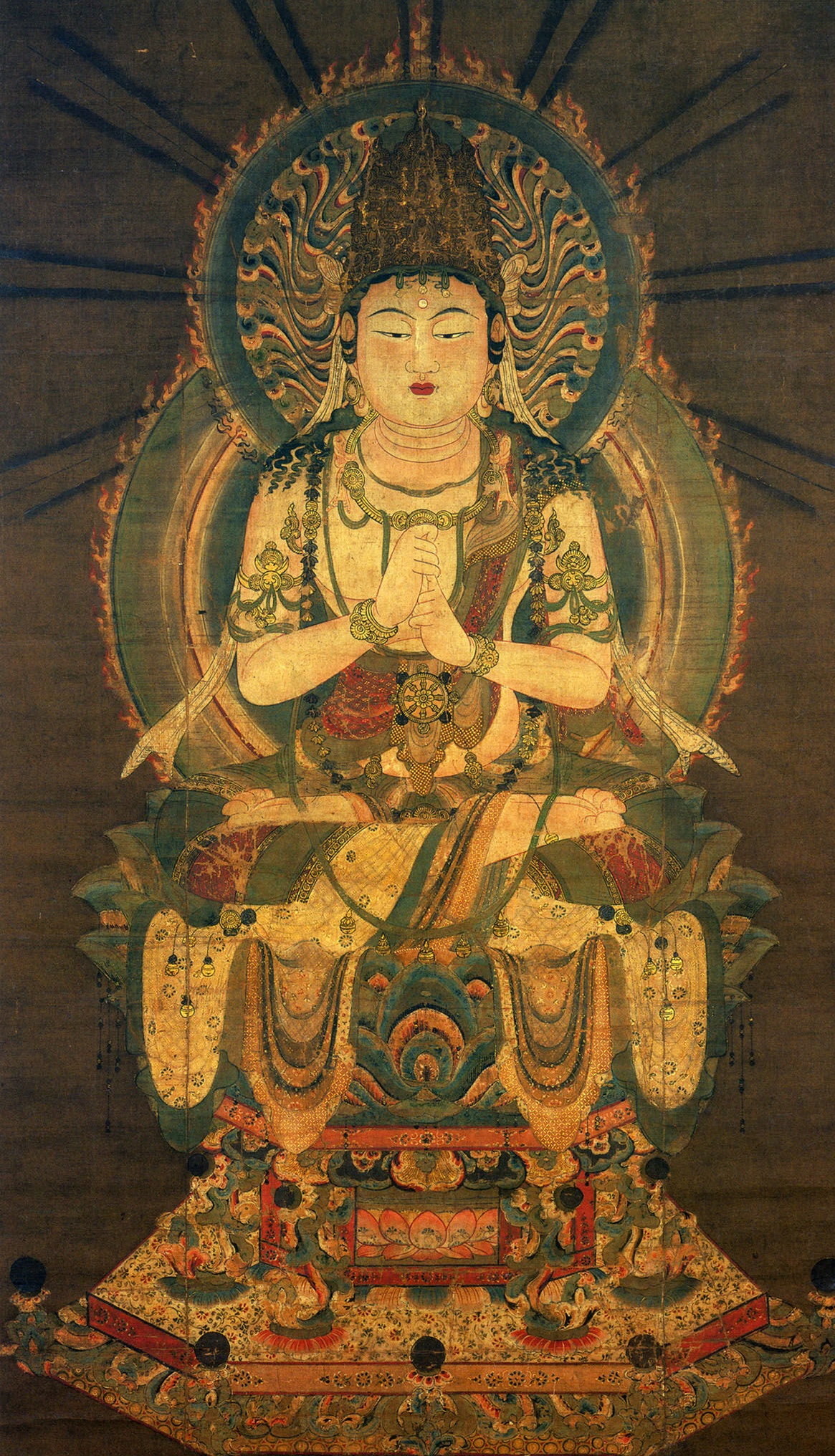
12th century painting of Mahāvairocana, Heian period, Nezu Museum

In Shingon, the Buddha Mahāvairocana (Sanskrit for "Great Illuminator"), also known as Dainichi Nyorai (大日如来, "Great Sun Tathagata") is the universal primordial (honji-shin) Buddha that is the basis of all phenomena. Śubhakarasiṃha's Darijing shu (大日經疏, J. Dainichikyōsho) states that Mahāvairocana is “the original ground dharmakāya.” (薄伽梵即毘盧遮那本地法身, at Taisho no. 1796:39.580). According to Hakeda, Kūkai identified the Dharmakaya with "the eternal Dharma, the uncreated, imperishable, beginningless, and endless Truth".

This ultimate reality does not exist independently of all things, but is immanent in them. Dainichi is worshipped as the supreme Buddha and also appears as the central figure of the Five Wisdom Buddhas. Hakeda also writes that in Shingon, Dainichi is "at the center of a multitude of Buddhas, bodhisattvas, and powers; He is the source of enlightenment and the unity underlying all variety. To attain enlightenment means to realize Mahāvairocana, the implication being that Mahāvairocana is originally within man."

According to Kūkai, the Buddha's light illuminates and pervades all, like the light of the sun (hence his name). The immanent presence also means that every being already has "original enlightenment" (hongaku) within. This is also known as the "enlightened mind" (bodhicitta) and the Buddha nature. As Kūkai writes: "Where is the Dharmakaya? It is not far away; it is in our body. The source of wisdom? In our mind; indeed, it is close to us!"

Because of this, there is the possibility of "becoming Buddha in this very embodied existence" (sokushin jōbutsu), even for the most depraved persons. All beings thus have the potential to become Buddhas through their own effort and through the power / grace (adhisthana) of the Buddha. Kūkai thus rejected the idea we lived in an age of Dharma decline and that therefore one had to be reborn in a pure land to attain enlightenment. This also informs his positive view of the natural world, as well as of the arts, all of which he saw as manifestations of the Buddha.

=== Activities and forms of the Dharmakaya ===
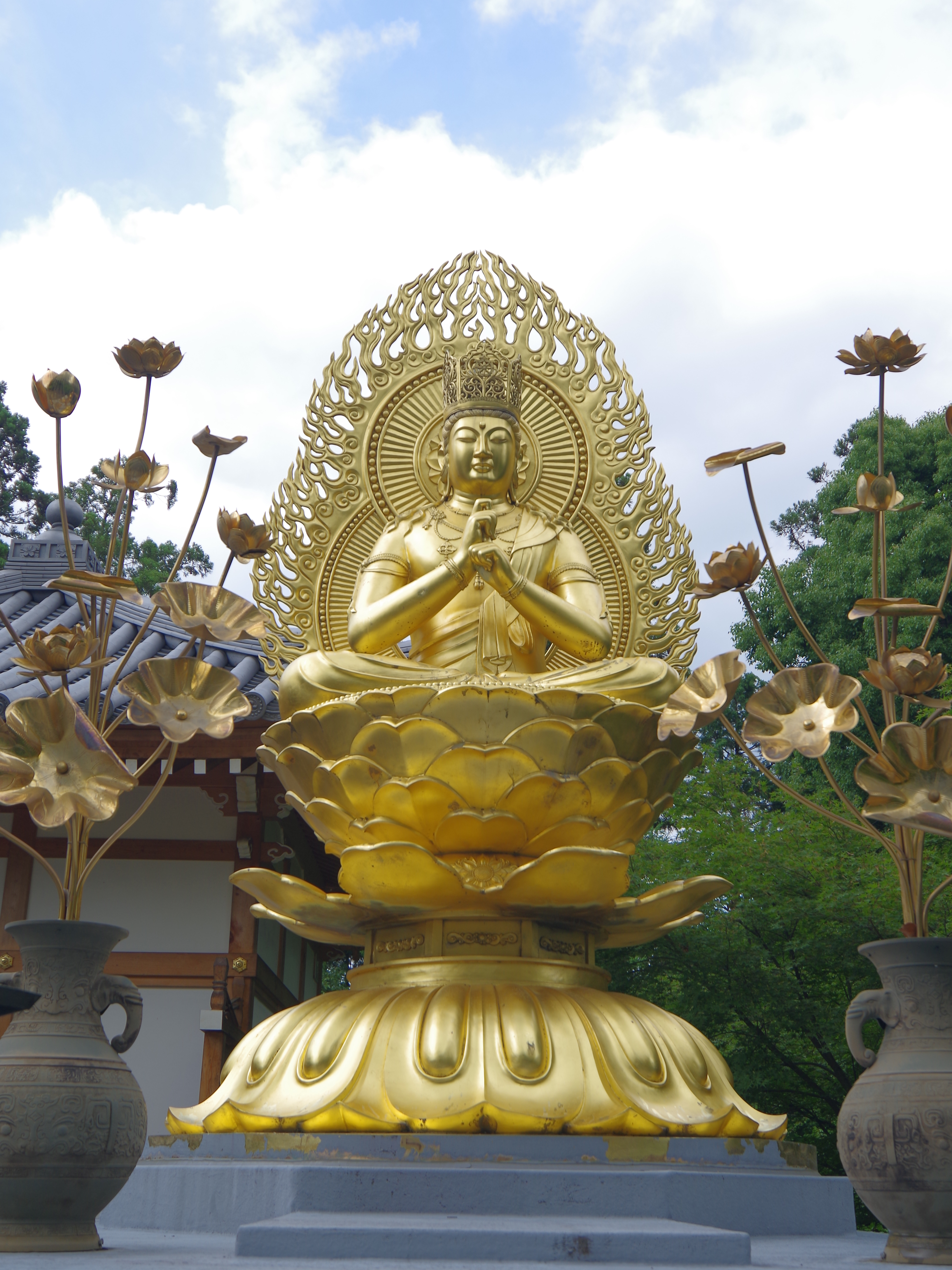
Dainichi-nyorai (Vairocana) image in Kume-dera

Dainichi is the ultimate source of all Buddhas and bodhisattvas, and of the entire cosmos. The centrality of Dainichi is seen in the fact that he appears at the centre of both the Diamond Realm and the Womb Realm mandalas. According to Kūkai, Mahāvairocana is also the Universal Principle which underlies all Buddhist teachings. Thus, other Buddhist deities can be thought of as manifestations of Dainichi, each with their own attributes. As Kūkai writes, "the great Self is one, yet can be many".

Like in the Huayan (Kegon) school, Shingon sees Dainichi's body as being equal to the entire universe. As Dharmakaya (Jpn: hosshin, Dharma body), Vairocana also constantly teaches the Dharma in inconceivable ways throughout the universe, including through the secret mysteries of Shingon esotericism. The Dharmakaya is embodied absolute reality and truth and is mostly ineffable but can be experienced through esoteric practices such as mudras and mantras. Ultimately, the whole phenomenal world itself and all the sounds and movements in it are also considered to be the teaching of Vairocana Buddha, which is identical with the cosmic body of the Buddha. Thus, for Kūkai, the entire universe, together with all actions, persons and Buddhas in it, are all part of Vairocana's cosmic sermon to its manifestations. In Shingon, this idea that all phenomena in the universe are constantly revealing the presence of the Dharmakaya Buddha, is part of the doctrine of "the dharmakaya's expounding of the Dharma" (hosshin seppō). Furthermore, according to the syncretic doctrine of honji suijaku, the Shinto sun goddess Amaterasu was considered a manifestation of Dainichi Nyorai along with other Shinto deities.

Kūkai explains the Dharmakaya as having four main bodies (shishu hosshin):

- Absolute Dharmakaya (jishō hosshin) – the ultimate wisdom body of all the Buddhas out which the entire cosmos manifests
- The Dharmakaya in Bliss / Participation (juyō hosshin) – it has two aspects: the bliss aspect, a state of absolute samadhi, and the participation aspect, which is how the Dharmakaya appears to the most advanced bodhisattvas as Buddha forms.
- Transformation Dharmakaya (henge hosshin) – how the Buddha appears to lower level bodhisattvas, sravakas and ordinary people. This includes the historical Buddha Shakyamuni.
- Emanation Dharmakaya (tōru hosshin) – bodies emanating from the Dharmakaya in many forms, including nonhuman beings and hell beings.

Although portrayed through the use of anthropomorphic metaphors, Shingon does not see the Dharmakaya Buddha as a separate or individual personal entity or a God standing apart from the universe. Instead, the Buddha is the universe properly understood.

=== The wisdom body of the Dharmakaya ===
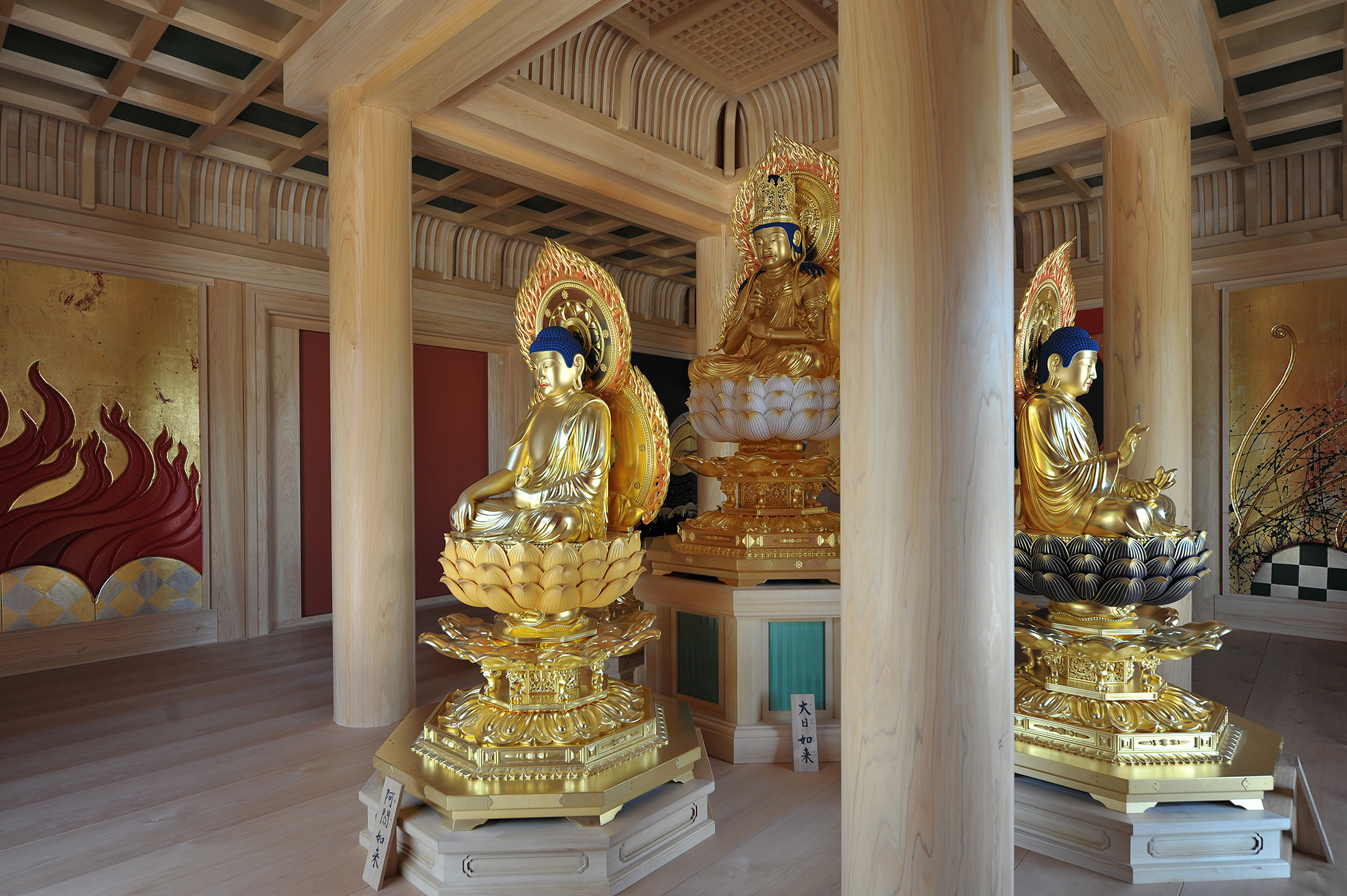
Statues of the Five Tathāgatas at Renge-in Tanjō-ji

Another important feature of the Dharmakaya in Kūkai's buddhology is his analysis of Vairocana's body of wisdom (chishin). According to this teaching, the Dharmakaya has five wisdoms, each one is associated with a Buddha and four of them are associated with a type of mundane consciousness (drawn from the Yogacara system of eight consciousnesses):

1. The Wisdom that Perceives the Essential Nature of the World of Dharma (hokkai taishō chi): the eternal Source of knowledge and light at the center of all things. It is represented by Mahāvairocana Buddha in the Vajradhatu Mandala.
2. Mirrorlike Wisdom (daienkyō): the wisdom which reflects things as they are without any distortion. It is represented by Aksobhya Buddha and is associated with the alaya-vijñana (storehouse consciousness).
3. Wisdom of Equality (byōdōshō chi): the wisdom which sees the identity and sameness of all phenomena and beings. It is represented by Ratnasambhava Buddha and is associated with the ego consciousness (manas).
4. Wisdom of Observation (myōkanzatchi): the wisdom which is free of discrimination and sees all objects of mind without discrimination / conceptualization. It is represented by Amitabha and is associated with the mental consciousness (manovijñana).
5. Wisdom of Action (jōsosa chi): the wisdom manifested as actions that help all sentient beings and guide them to Buddhahood. It is represented by Amoghasiddhi and is associated with the five sense consciousnesses.

In the Vajrasekhara, the illumination of the Buddha's body of wisdom is symbolized as a vajra, Indra's indestructible adamantine weapon, and it represents the dynamic function of penetrating insight. In the Mahavairocana Sutra, meanwhile, the Buddha's Body of Principle (Jp.: ri; Ch.: li) is symbolized by a lotus and stands for "compassion, potentiality, growth and creativity" according to Hakeda. For Kūkai, both of these bodies are non-dual. Kūkai writes:

That which realizes is Wisdom and that which is to be realized is Principle. The names differ, but they are one in their essential nature.

=== The six great elements, the four mandalas and the three mysteries ===
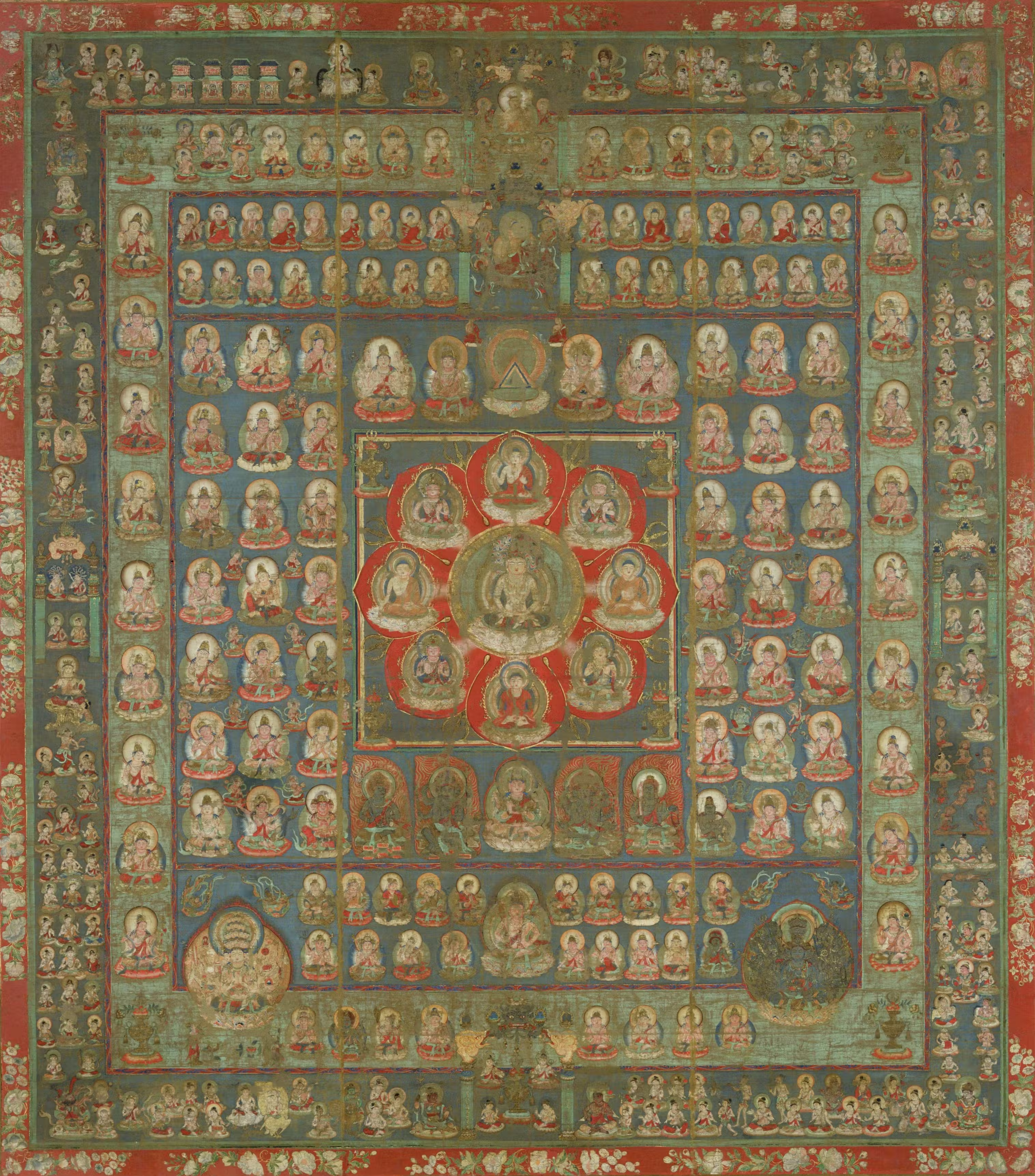
Garbhadhātu (Womb Realm) maṇḍala with Mahāvairocana located at the center of the circle

According to Kūkai, the Dharmakaya can further be explained terms of the "Body of Six Great Elements" (rokudaishin). This means that for Kūkai, the Dharmakaya consists of the six great elements which "are interfused and are in a state of eternal harmony". The great elements (mahābhūtani) are earth, water, fire, wind, space, and consciousness, and they are the universal elements out of which all beings and matter are made. These great elements are all in a state of perfect interfusion (yuanrong, 圓融, i.e. they are all harmoniously interconnected), a teaching which was first articulated in the Huayan school by patriarchs like Fazang. Like Fazang, Kūkai uses the metaphor of Indra's Net to describe the infinite interrelation of all existence, meaning that the Dharmakaya Mahāvairocana and every sentient being in the universe "are not identical but are nevertheless identical; they are not different but are nevertheless different."

For Kūkai, the consequence of this doctrine is a complete non-duality between seemingly different phenomena like mind and matter, humanity and nature, sentient and insentient, and so on. Thus, Kūkai writes: "matter is no other than mind; mind is no other than matter. Without any obstruction, they are interrelated." This interrelation is one of macrocosmic harmony, an eternal natural order (hōni no dōri) which is identical with the yoga and samadhi of the Dharmakaya. Sentient beings, as microcosmic manifestations of the Dharmakaya, can tune in to that harmony through practicing samadhi.

Another perspective with which to understand the Dharmakaya is through the four mandalas (circles, ranges, spheres) which stand for the cosmic Buddha Vairocana's extension, intention, communication and action:

- Mahāmandala – the entire physical universe as the body of the Dharmakaya Buddha
- Samayamandala – the ultimate intention of the Dharmakaya Buddha which is omnipresent throughout the universe and is universal compassion
- Dharmamandala – the universal sphere in which the Dharmakaya Buddha's preaching and revelation of the Dharma is taking place
- Karmamandala – the universal activities of the Dharmakaya Buddha, i.e. all the movements of the universe

These four mandalas are all said to be deeply interconnected or as Kūkai writes "inseparably related to one another".

The constant preaching of the Dharmakaya Buddha throughout the cosmos is described in Shingon as the "three mysteries" (三密, sanmi). Hakeda describes these three as "the suprarational activities or functions of the Body, Speech, and Mind of Mahāvairocana." The three mysteries are found throughout the entire universe as the movements of natural phenomena, natural sounds and as all experiences. Kūkai compares it to a sacred book "being painted by brushes of mountains, by ink of oceans", which have heaven and earth as the bindings.

The non-dual nature of all mandalas and the interpenetration of all phenomena embodied as Mahavairocana's body and functions is a key Shingon view which also underlies its understanding of the practice of the three secrets. As such, Kūkai explains how Shingon practice enacts the unity of all actions and things in the following important passage:

The six symbolic elements interpenetrate without obstruction and are in eternal union.

They are not apart from any of the Four Mandalas.

Through practice of three-secrets empowerment, they manifest immediately.

The universal web is what we call this body.

All things are naturally endowed with bodhisattva wisdom transcending the essential mind, the subsidiary minds [limited aspects of mind], and the objects of the senses.

Each of the Five Wisdoms is endowed with unlimited wisdom.

Since it is the power of the perfect mirror, this is true enlightened wisdom.

As such, through the Shingon "three-secrets yoga" (sanmitsu yuga), a practitioner unifies his body, speech and mind with those of the Buddha's Dharmakaya. Kūkai states that "the three secrets bring about the response of empowerment [kaji] and he quickly attains great enlightenment".

=== Buddha's power and self-power ===
The three mysteries are also interpreted as tapping into the energy, grace or sustaining power (Skt. adhiṣṭhāna, Jp. kaji) of the Buddha, which according to Kūkai "indicates great compassion on the part of the Tathagata and faith (Skt. citta-prasāda, Jp. shinjin) on the part of sentient beings." Kūkai compares this process to rays of sun (the Buddha's power) shining on water (sentient beings) and the water's ability to retain the heat of the rays. Kūkai also holds that faith comes through the power of the Buddha; it is not something acquired by one's own efforts. Indeed, for Kūkai, the three mysteries are innate in all beings, and the fact that these are united with the macrocosmic three mysteries of the Dharmakaya is what makes faith possible.

However, in Shingon, it is not solely through the Buddha's power that one accumulates merit and attains enlightenment; rather, it is through a conjunction of "the three powers" (sanriki): the power of Buddha's blessing or grace (nyorai kaji-riki, which is "other power," tariki); one's power of self-merit (ga kudoku-riki, i.e. "self-power", jiriki); and the power of the Dharma realm (hokkai riki), the interfused self-nature in which self and Buddha are non-dual. As such, in Shingon, self-power and other-power are not two separate powers but are non-dual.

Kūkai describes this as "the Buddha entering the self and the self entering the Buddha" (nyūga ga'nyū, literally "entering-self and self-entering") in his Dainichi-kyo Kaidai ("Interpretation of the Mahavairocana Sutra"). Yamasaki calls this "a subtle process of the self, the deity, and the universe" in which "in striving 'upward', the individual perceives an energy flowing 'downward' as if to aid his striving."

=== Buddhahood ===
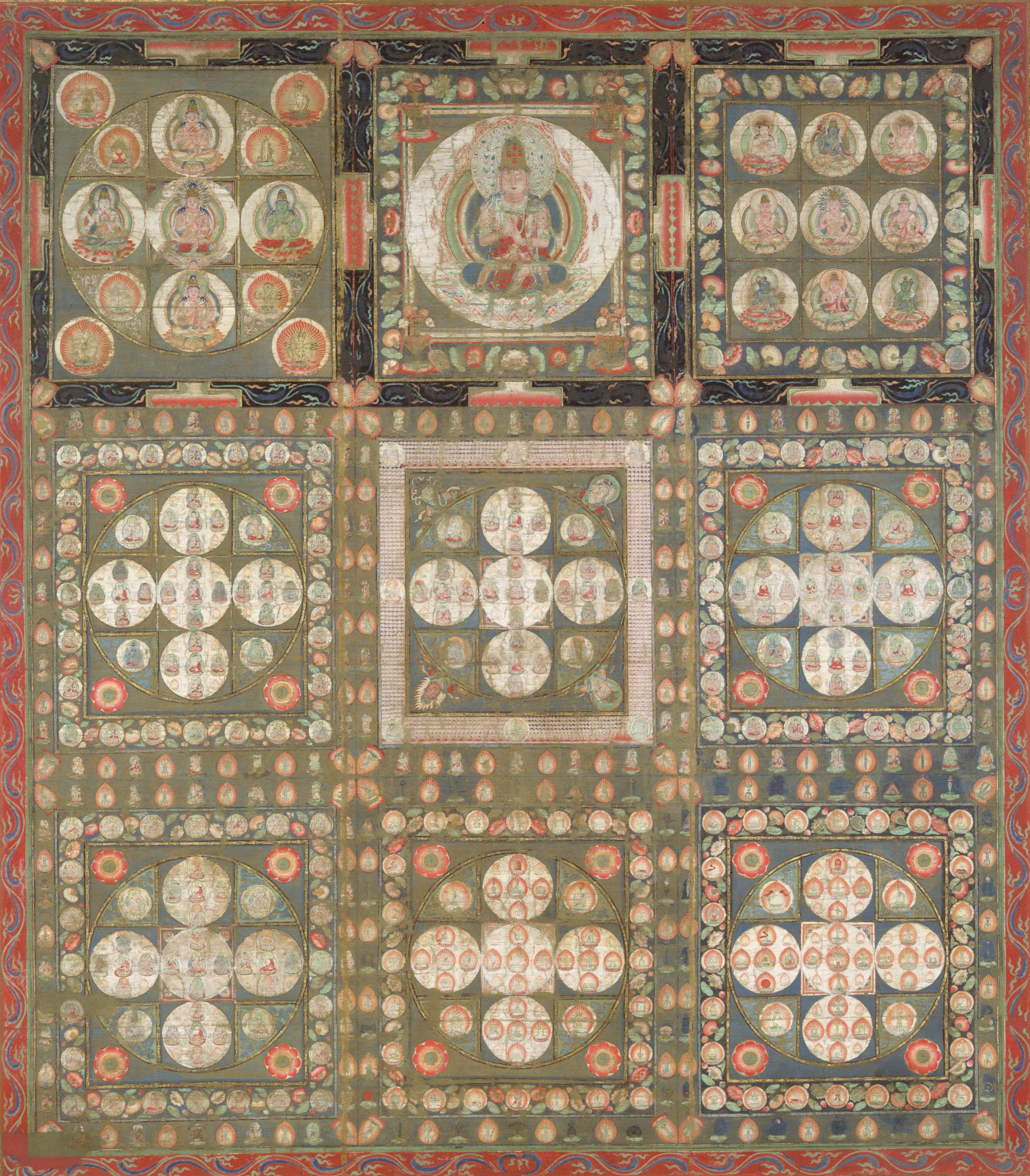
An illustration of the Diamond Realm Mandala

According to Shingon doctrine, Buddhahood is not a distant, foreign reality that can take aeons to approach but it is a real possibility within this very life. This is because the buddha-nature / original enlightenment is present within all beings. Kūkai describes this immanent reality within all beings as "the glorious mind, the most secret and sacred".

According to Kūkai, the core teaching on enlightenment in the Mahāvairocana sutra is found in the following passages:

The enlightened mind [bodhicitta] is the cause, great compassion [mahakaruna] is the root, and skillful means [upaya] is the ultimate...enlightenment is to know your own mind as it really is...Seek in your own mind enlightenment and all-embracing wisdom. Why? Because it is originally pure and bright.

This means that Buddhahood can be attained because all beings already have enlightenment and "all embracing wisdom" within which is "originally pure and bright" according to Kūkai. With the help of a genuine teacher and through proper training, one can reclaim and liberate this enlightened capacity for the benefit of oneself and others. When cultivated, the luminous enlightened mind manifests as awakened wisdom.

Kūkai systematized and categorized all Buddhist teachings into ten stages of spiritual realization, from the lowest type of worldly mind to the highest mind of exoteric Buddhism (the view of Huayan/Kegon) to the supreme mind attained through Shingon.

=== The nature of esoteric Buddhism ===
Kūkai wrote at length on the difference between exoteric, that is to say, mainstream (non-tantric) Mahayana Buddhism and esoteric Mantrayana (or Vajrayana) Buddhism. For him, the differences between exoteric and esoteric can be summarised as follows:

1. Esoteric teachings are preached by the Dharmakaya Buddha, Vairocana, and are "secret & profound, containing the final truth". Exoteric teachings are preached by nirmanakaya (emanation) Buddhas, like Shakyamuni, and are "simplified" skillful means. Exoteric Mahayana sutras also contain hidden esoteric meanings which Kūkai discusses in his works. For example, the title of the Lotus Sutra is considered a mantra by Kūkai.
2. Kūkai held that exoteric doctrines were upāyas ("skillful means"), teachings adapted to the needs of beings according to their capacities and time. The esoteric doctrines, in comparison, are the truth itself—a direct communication of the innermost secrets of the Dharmakaya, and his timeless eternally present samadhi.
3. Exoteric teachings are gradual (and may take aeons); esoteric methods are the "sudden approach"—or, at the very least, provide a much faster way to enlightenment. Even the most depraved of beings, the icchantikas, can attain awakening through the simplest esoteric method: recitation of a mantra.
4. Esoteric Buddhism contains within it all the teachings of exoteric Buddhism, and more. Exoteric Buddhist schools lack the special methods of esoteric Buddhism, which is the highest expression of Buddhism. These esoteric rituals—involving the use of mantras, mudras, and mandalas—are the direct communication of the Dharmakaya, and provide direct access to the ultimate truth.
5. Esoteric Buddhism has the highest view of the ultimate truth, which sees the mind of Mahāvairocana as united with the mind of all beings, and the body of Mahāvairocana as being the body of the universe (which contains all sentient beings).

== Practice ==
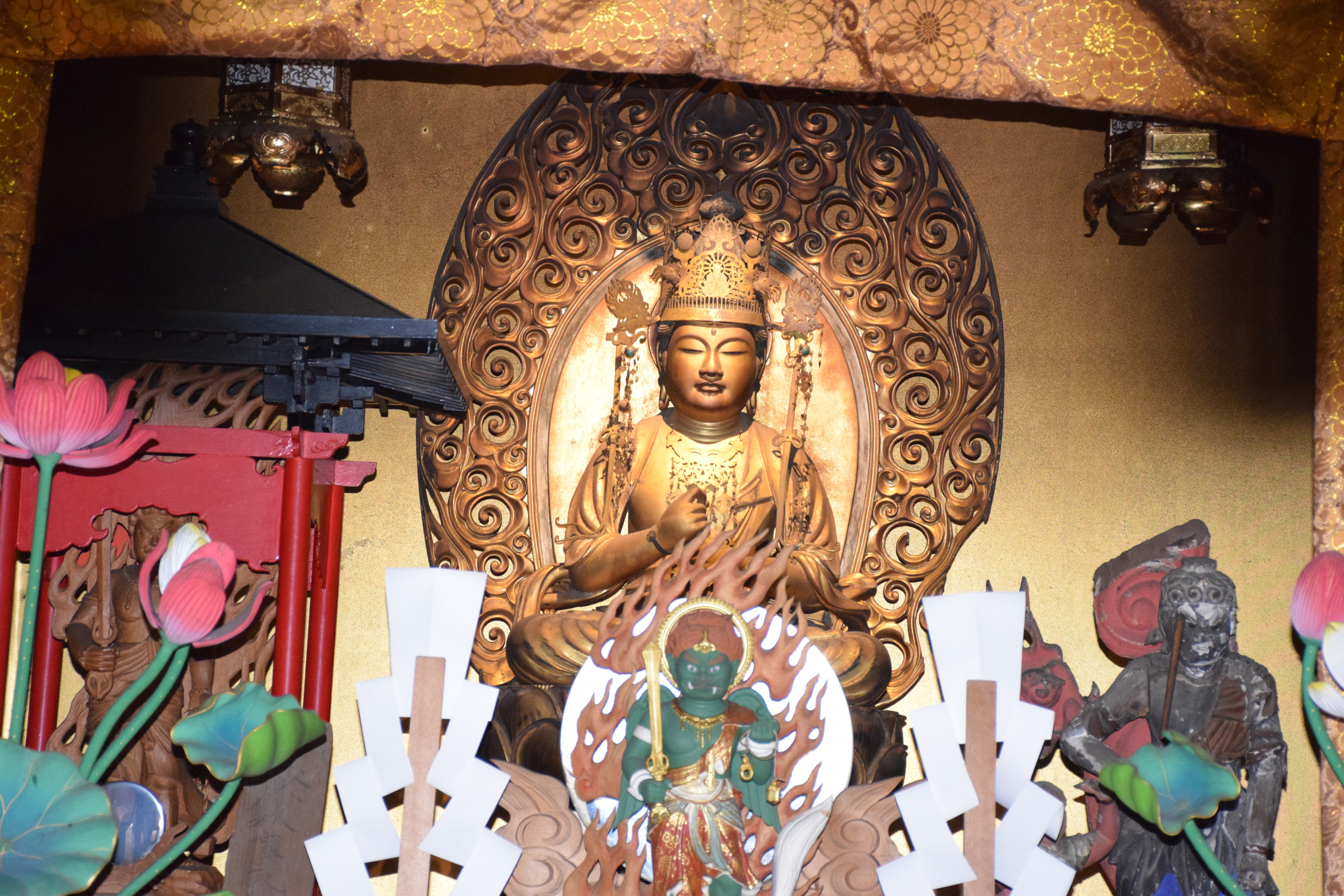
Shingon altar with Vairocana Buddha and Acala at Enmyō-in

Video showing prayer service at Kōshō-ji in Nagoya. A monk is rhythmically beating a drum while chanting sutras.

The goal of Shingon is the realization that one's true nature is identical with the universal Mahāvairocana Buddha, a goal that is achieved through esoteric initiation, and mantrayana ritual practices. Shingon practice thus depends on receiving secret doctrines, methods and instructions, from the school's ordained masters. The "Three Mysteries" of body, speech, and mind participate simultaneously in the subsequent process of revealing one's nature: the body through devotional gestures (mudra) and the use of ritual instruments, speech through sacred formulas (mantra), and mind through meditation. These methods allow a Shingon contemplative to realize that his body-mind is none other than the body-mind of Mahāvairocana.

=== The Three Mysteries and consecration ===
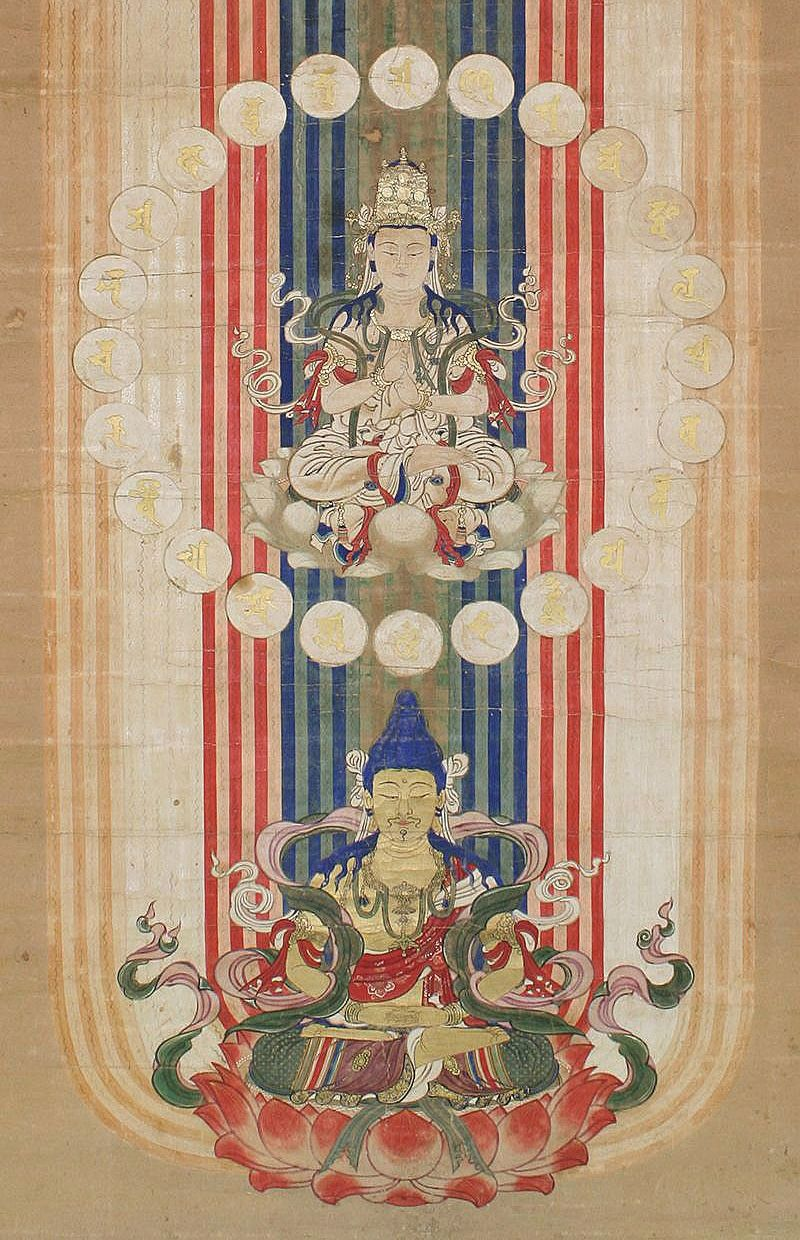
A painting of the Mantra of Light (Japanese: kōmyō shingon, 光明眞言) mandala, Edo Period, approximately 17th–18th century. This is a popular mantra in Shingon.

The essence of Shingon practice is to experience the Dharmakaya, the ultimate reality, by emulating the inner realization of the Dharmakaya through the synchronized meditative ritual use of mantras, mudras (hand gestures) and visualization of mandalas. These are known as the "three modes of action" and are the central methods of Shingon esoteric practice. These three "ritual technologies" are equivalent to the concept of the "three mysteries", the secrets of body, speech and mind (of the Buddha Vairocana) and these are introduced in the ritual of abhisheka (consecration) where tantric vows (samaya) are undertaken by initiates. As the Indian Shingon patriarch Śubhākarasiṃha states: "the three modes of action are simply the three secrets, and the three secrets are simply the three modes of action. The three [Buddha] bodies are simply the wisdom of tathāgata Mahavairocana."

The abhisheka includes entering a prepared ritual space with a mandala while blindfolded and throwing a flower into the mandala, which lands on a specific deity depicted in the mandala. After the consecration, the esoteric initiate is taught how to visualize the deities and mandalas, along with the secret mudras and mantras of his deity, and these secrets are revealed to be none other than the expression of the body-speech-mind of the Buddha. Through the consecration and use of these three mysteries, the initiate is said to ritually replicate the body, speech, and mind of the Buddha, achieving buddhahood in this very existence.

==== Mandala ====
Visualizing a mandala corresponds to the mental activity of the Buddha. The most important Shingon mandalas are known as the Mandala of the Two Realms which are: The Womb Realm (Sanskrit: Garbhadhātu; Japanese: 胎蔵界曼荼羅, romanized: Taizōkai) mandala based on the Mahavairocana Sutra and the Diamond Realm (Sanskrit: Vajradhātu; Japanese: 金剛界曼荼羅, romanized: Kongōkai) mandala based on the Vajrasekhara Sutra. These two mandalas are considered to be a compact expression of the entirety of Buddhahood as well as a representation of the totality of existence.

According to Yamasaki, the "Great Compassion Womb Repository Birth Mandala": "represents the enlightened universe from the viewpoint of compassion". It is also associated with skillful means and the lotus is its key symbol. Regarding the Vajra Realm mandala, Yamasaki writes that it "embodies the vajra-wisdom that illuminates the universe". This is the Buddha's wisdom body which is indestructible like the mythic adamantine weapon (vajra). Yamasaki also adds that while the womb realm generally represents the five material elements, the vajra realm represents the mind and consciousness elements. However, both mandalas are not a duality, but are ultimately seen as non-dual. As such, "the two mandalas together thus signify the indissoluble unity of Truth and Wisdom, the inseparability of Matter and Mind, the resolution of mystical paradox."

==== Mantra ====
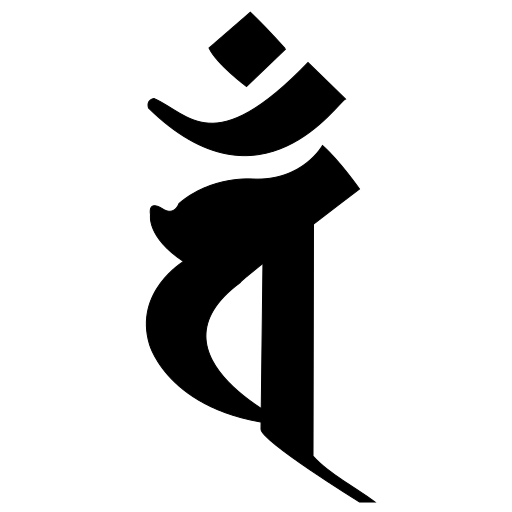
Vaṃ – the seed syllable mantra of Mahavairocana in the Vajradhātu Mandala

Mantras are another key element of Shingon praxis (corresponding to the speech of the Dharmakaya Buddha). Kūkai understood mantras as the most concentrated form of the teachings of the Dharmakaya Buddha. According to Kūkai, Shingon mantras contain the entire meaning of all the scriptures and indeed the entire universe (which is itself the preaching of the Dharmakaya). Kūkai argues that mantras are effective because: "a mantra is suprarational; it eliminates ignorance when meditated upon and recited. A single word contains a thousand truths; one can realize Suchness here and now."

Furthermore, Kūkai also states:

By reciting the voiced syllables with clear understanding, one manifests the truth. What is called "the truth of the voiced syllable" is the three secrets in which all things and the Buddha are equal. This is the original essence of all beings. For this reason, Dainichi Nyorai's teaching of the true meaning of the voiced syllable will startle into awakening those long sleeping.

As such, mantras are also not mere incantations, but manifest the power and blessings of the Buddha, being full embodiments of the Buddha. According to the Commentary to the Mahavairocana Sutra (Da Rijing shu 大日經疏, T. 1796) of Yi Xing:

The reason that only the Mantra Gate fulfills the secret is that [ritual is performed] by empowerment with the truth. If mantras are recited only in one's mouth, without contemplation of their meaning, then only their worldly effect can be accomplished—but the adamantine body-nature cannot.

Mantras (and bījas, or "seed-syllable" mantras) are generally associated with a Buddhist deity; for example, the seed syllable of Mahavairocana in the Garbhadhātu Mandala is "A", while a key mantra of Mahavairocana is "a vi ra hūṃ kha". Some deities have multiple seed mantras as well along with different mantras.

In Shingon, mantras (as well as dharanis, vidyas, etc.) are recorded in Sanskrit, using the Siddhaṃ alphabet (JP: shittan 悉曇, or bonji 梵字). However, the pronunciation of mantras is in a Sino-Japanese style, not any Indian style of Sanskrit pronunciation.

==== Mudra ====
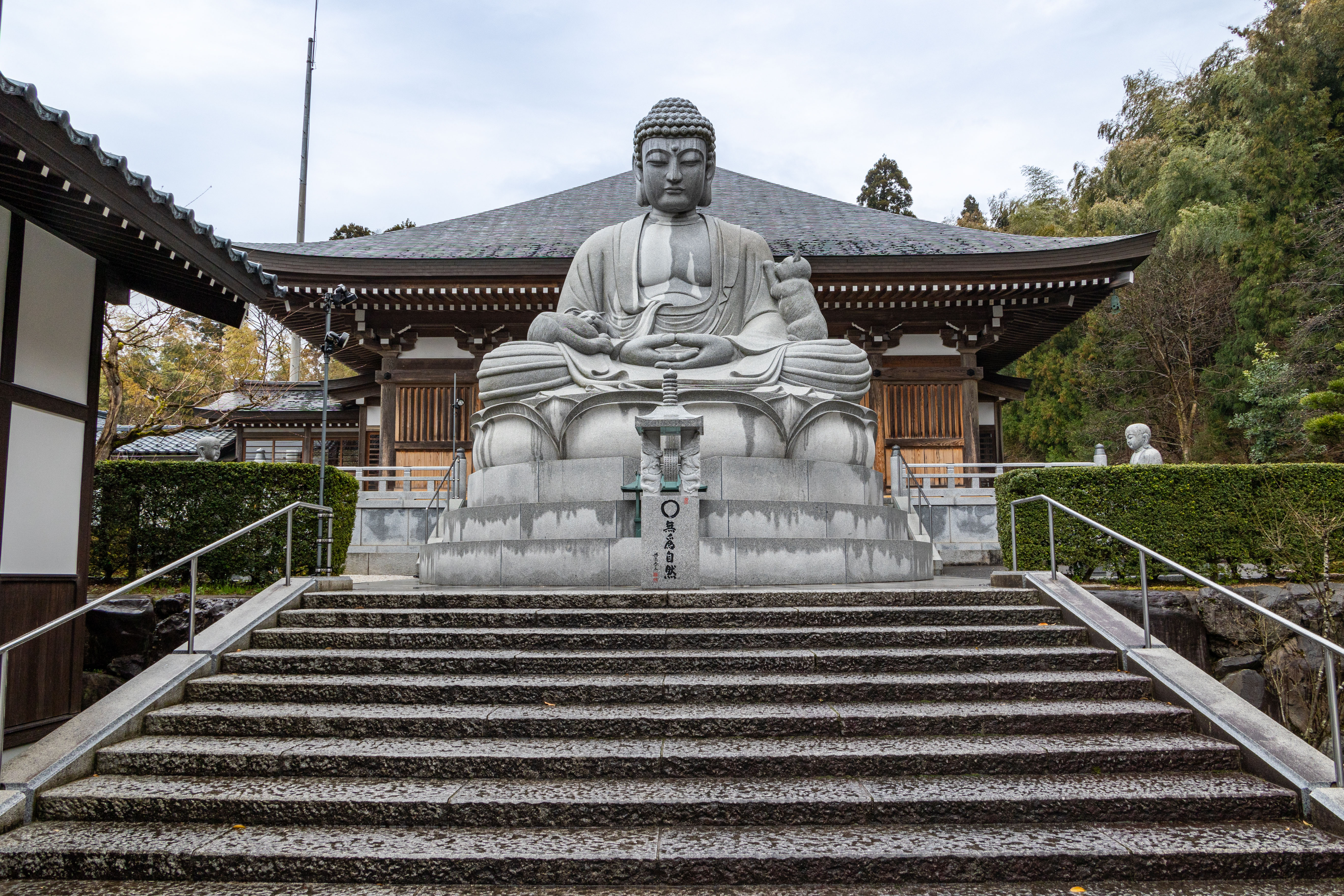
A statue of a Buddha performing the Dharma Realm Samadhi mudra, which embodies how "the space between the thumbtips encompasses the universe where Buddha and self interpenetrate without obstruction" (Yamasaki)

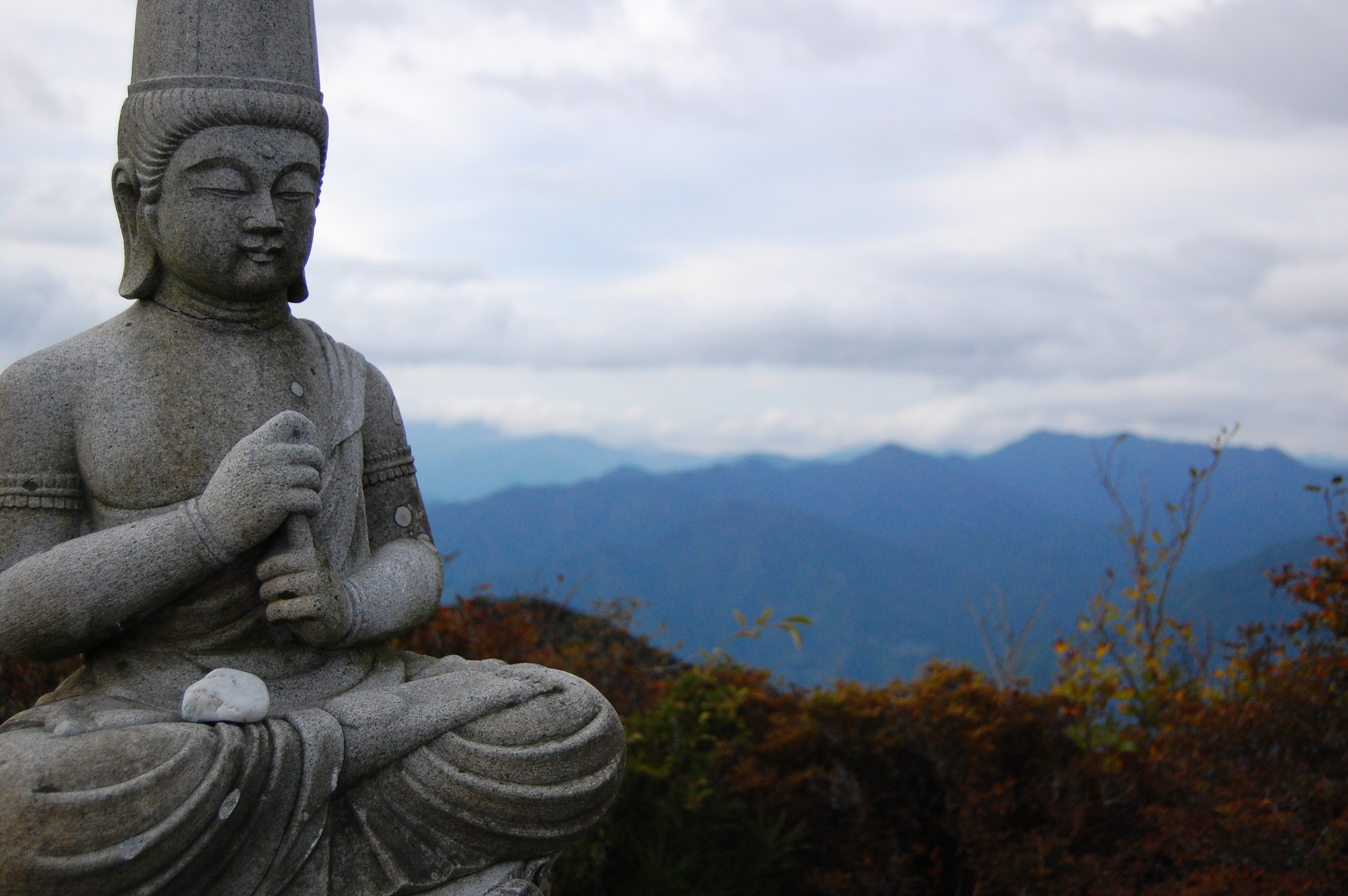
A statue of Dainichi Nyorai performing the Wisdom Fist mudra (chiken-in), which embodies the non-duality of living beings and Buddha wisdom

Mudras ("seals") are hand gestures which represent the secret of the Buddha's body and, as such, symbolize and enact Buddha activity. There are numerous mudras used in the various Shingon practices. According to Yamasaki, mudras "symbolically identify the individual with the universe. In this way, the human body functions as a living symbol of the macrocosm." The term mudra can have multiple meanings, as well; in some cases, it is a very general term, referring to the Buddha's Dharmakaya (whereupon it may be called the "great mudra", mahamudra). As such, the Commentary on the Mahavairocana sutra states: "Mudra is none other than a symbol of the Dharma Realm. Using mudra, one points to the body of the Dharma Realm."

The hand gestures themselves are either termed samaya mudra (when it refers to a deity's attribute, like a sword, lotus, etc) or karma mudra (when it symbolizes their activity). Each hand and finger has various symbolic associations in Shingon; e.g., the right hand generally represents the Buddha, while the left hand symbolizes ordinary beings, including the yogin themselves. Other associations include: right hand: Wisdom, Buddha-Realm, Sun, and Vajra Realm mandala; left hand: Truth, Phenomenal Realm, Moon, and Womb Realm mandala. The fingers may represent the five senses and the five elements.

A key mudra is the añjali mudrā (Jp: gasshō) which symbolizes the unity of the Buddha realm with the world of phenomena and sentient beings. There are actually various forms of the gasshō apart from the standard palm to palm version, including the lotus gasshō and the vajra gasshō. Another important mudra in Shingon (one also used in other traditions such as Zen) is the "Dharmadhatu Samadhi" mudra (hokkai jō-in) which symbolizes the union of self with Buddha, the phenomenal world with the Buddha Realm. The "Wisdom Fist" (chiken-in) mudra also enacts the unity of Buddha and living beings: in this mudra, the breath of life (symbolized by the index finger on the left hand, which stands for the air element) touches the all-encompassing emptiness (symbolized by the thumb tucked within the right fist, representing the space element), which also symbolizes the Buddha's wisdom (itself inseparable from emptiness, and all-pervasive).

=== Ajikan and other contemplative methods ===
The siddhaṃ letter a

Another important meditative practice of Shingon is Ajikan (阿字觀) "meditating on the letter A" (Nagari: अ, Siddham: 𑖀) written using the Siddhaṃ alphabet. The letter A is an important symbol in Mahayana and in esoteric Buddhism, which signifies the Dharmakaya, the Buddha Mahavairocana, emptiness, Prajñaparamita, and non-arising (anutpada). While the writings of Kukai do discuss the letter A and how it is important for esoteric practice, they do not provide step-by-step meditation instructions. The earliest source for the details of this practice is Jitsue's (実恵, 786–849) Record of Oral Instruction on the Ajikan (Ajikan yōjin kuketsu, 阿字觀用心口決, Taisho no. 2423). It details the contemplation of a letter "A" inside of a white moon disk, which itself sits on a lotus flower. The moon represents the awakened mind (bodhicitta) and the lotus represents the heart (hrdaya). Since then, over a hundred Ajikan manuals have been written, and Ajikan has become a central practice in the Shingon school.

There are other forms of Shingon practice. For example, in Gachirinkan (月輪觀, "Full Moon Visualization"), an image of the moon (an important symbol of the enlightened mind) is used for visualization. In Gojigonjingan (五字嚴身觀, "Visualization of the Five Elements Arrayed in the Body," from the Mahavairocana Tantra), the focus is on the five elements (mahābhūtani) as manifestations of the Buddha Vairocana.

Shingon Buddhist temples also perform liturgical rites which include the chanting of sutras and other liturgy. This may be accompanied by instruments such as the taiko drum. A popular style of Buddhist chanting in Shingon is called shōmyō (声明), a style influenced by traditional Japanese music.

Shingon practice may also include the practice of nembutsu or other methods associated with Amitabha and his Pure Land. In Shingon, this practice is understood through the lens of esoteric Buddhism—hence seeing the Buddha Amitabha (who is equated with Mahavairocana) as being immanent in the human "heart-mind", and the pure land of Sukhavati as being non-dual with this world. "Esoteric Pure Land" practice was taught by Shingon figures such as Kakuban (1095–1143) and Dōhan (1179–1252).

Various Chinese masters also taught dharanis related to Amitabha; for example, Amoghavajra translated the popular "Amitabha Pure Land Rebirth Dharani", along with numerous other texts that teach methods for rebirth in Sukhavati.

=== Ethical precepts ===
Another important element of Shingon practice is the keeping of Buddhist ethical precepts (kai). For Kūkai, keeping Buddhist precepts is essential for meditation and for living in harmony with one's true nature. Kūkai writes: "If we aspire to go far, unless we depend on our feet, we cannot advance; if we wish to walk the Way of Buddha, unless we observe the precepts, we cannot reach the goal." He even goes so far as to say that we should not break the precepts even to save our lives, and that those who do break them are not disciples of the Buddha and he [Kūkai] will not be their teacher.

Shingon ethical teachings rely on the basic Buddhist precepts, Mahayana bodhisattva precepts (from the Brahmajala Sutra) along with special mantrayana esoteric samayas (vows). According to Kūkai, "all of these precepts have their foundation in the Ten Precepts", i.e. the ten wholesome dharma paths (daśa-kuśala-karmapatha). Furthermore, the very essence of all the precepts can be reduced to the fact that "the essential nature of our mind is not distinct from that of the Buddha."

Regarding the esoteric vows (samayas), there are four main samayas in Shingon:

1. Never abandoning the True Dharma. One should master all the teachings of the Buddha without forsaking a single teaching.
2. Never giving up bodhicitta, which is understood as both the intention to become a Buddha for the sake of all beings and the originally enlightened mind itself (respectively, they are the subjective and objective aspects of bodhicitta, they are understood as being non-dual). This is the most important samaya for Kūkai.
3. Never withholding or being "tight fisted" regarding the teaching of Dharma to others. One must always share Dharma.
4. Never avoid benefiting sentient beings (and never harm them), especially through the "four embracing acts" (i.e. the "four ways of attracting", Skt. catuhsamgrahavastu; generosity, loving words, beneficial acts, adapting oneself to other's needs).

=== Esoteric transmission ===
Apart from basic meditations, prayers, and the reading and recitation of Mahayana sutras, there are mantras and ritualistic meditative techniques that are available for laypersons to practice on their own under the supervision of a Shingon priest (ajari 阿闍梨, from Sanskrit: ācārya). However, many esoteric practices require the student to undergo an abhiṣeka initiation (kanjō 灌頂) into each of these practices under the guidance of a qualified ācārya before they may begin to learn and practice them. As with all schools of Esoteric Buddhism, great emphasis is placed on initiation and oral transmission of teachings from teacher to student.

As such, all Shingon followers who desire to practice the esoteric methods must gradually develop a teacher-student relationship, formal or informal, whereby a teacher permitted to transmit the abhiseka (i.e. a mahācārya, Jp: dai-ajari) learns the disposition of the student and teaches esoteric practices accordingly. For lay practitioners, there is no initiation ceremony beyond the Kechien Kanjō (結縁灌頂), which aims to help create the bond between the follower and Mahavairocana Buddha.

=== Training for ācāryas ===
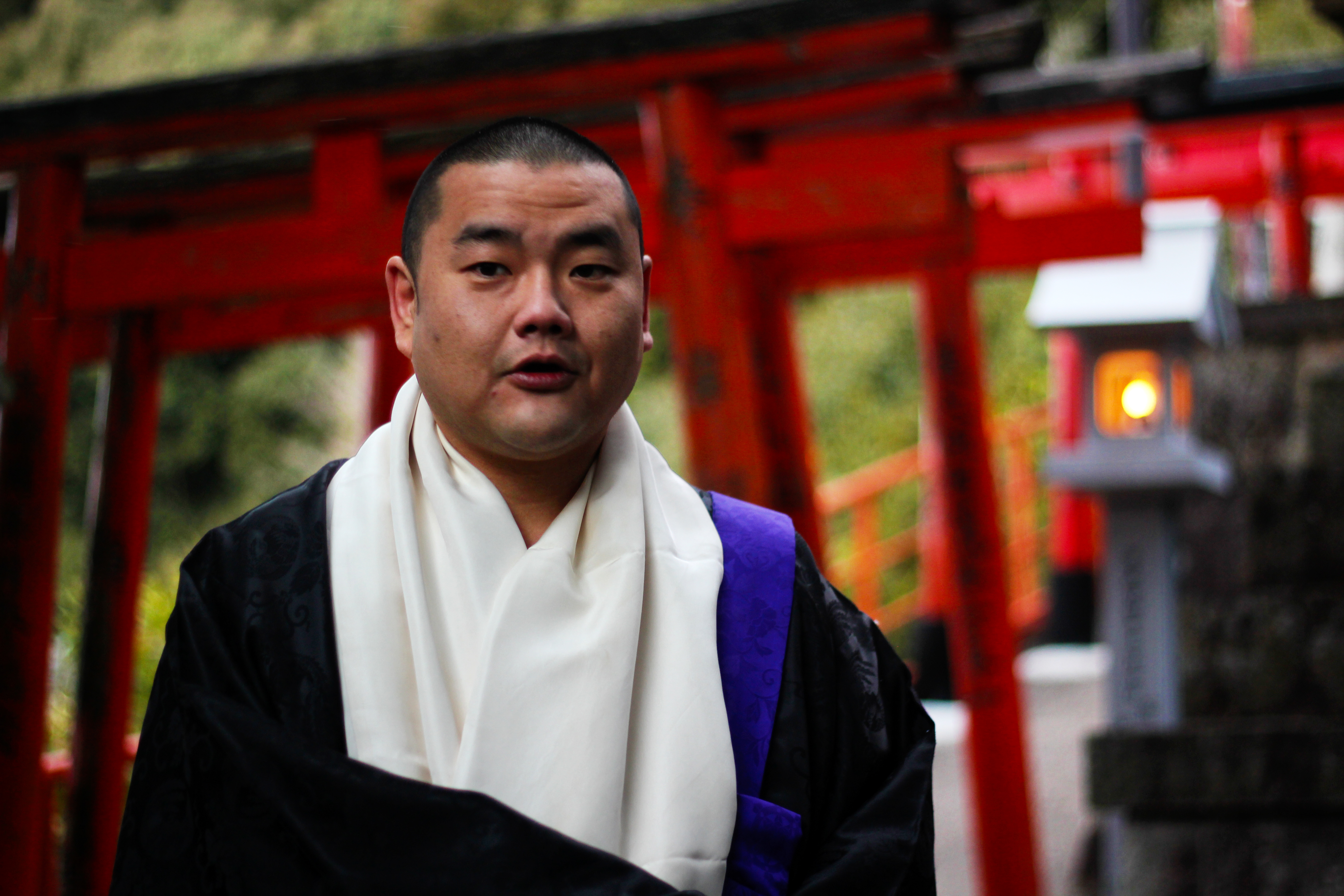
A priest from the Chuin-ryu lineage at Shigisan Chosonshi Temple (朝護孫子寺)

In the case of disciples wishing to train to become a Shingon ācārya (esoteric master), it is required to undergo a period of academic study and religious discipline—or formal training in a temple for a longer period of time—after having already received novice ordination and monastic precepts; and, as well, full completion of the rigorous four-fold preliminary training and retreat known as shido kegyō (四度加行), which must be completed under the guidance of a qualified master. The training involves esoteric rites focused on invoking specific buddhas or bodhisattvas (the honzon or “principal deity”) and also include pilgrimages to holy sites. According to Robert Sharf:

All Shingon rituals and ceremonies are organized as a sequence of smaller liturgical procedures that typically consist of an incantation (a mantra, dharani, hymn, etc.) accompanied by a hand gesture (mudra) and a guided contemplation (kanso). The four initiations that comprise the Shidokegyo—namely the Juhachido (eighteen methods), Kongokai (vajra-realm practice), Taizokai (matrix-realm practice), and Goma (fire ceremony)—consist of hundreds of such segments of varying duration and complexity.

These complex rites are taught through oral transmission (kuden) between a master and a student, a process aided by numerous ritual manuals and texts. Depending on the lines of transmission (ryu), the specific details of each rite may differ.

An ācārya in Shingon is a committed and experienced teacher who is authorized to guide and teach practitioners. In the Kōyasan tradition, one must be an ācārya for a number of years at least before one can request to be tested at Mount Kōya for the possibility to qualify as a mahācārya, or "great teacher" (dento dai-ajari 傳燈大阿闍梨)—the highest rank of Shingon practice.

However, other Shingon schools outside the Kōyasan tradition may use different terminology, and for them, the term dai-ajari may have no such special meaning. It is also possible that the creation of the specialized dai-ajari rank at Kōyasan may have been a tradition which developed after Kūkai.

=== Goma fire ritual ===
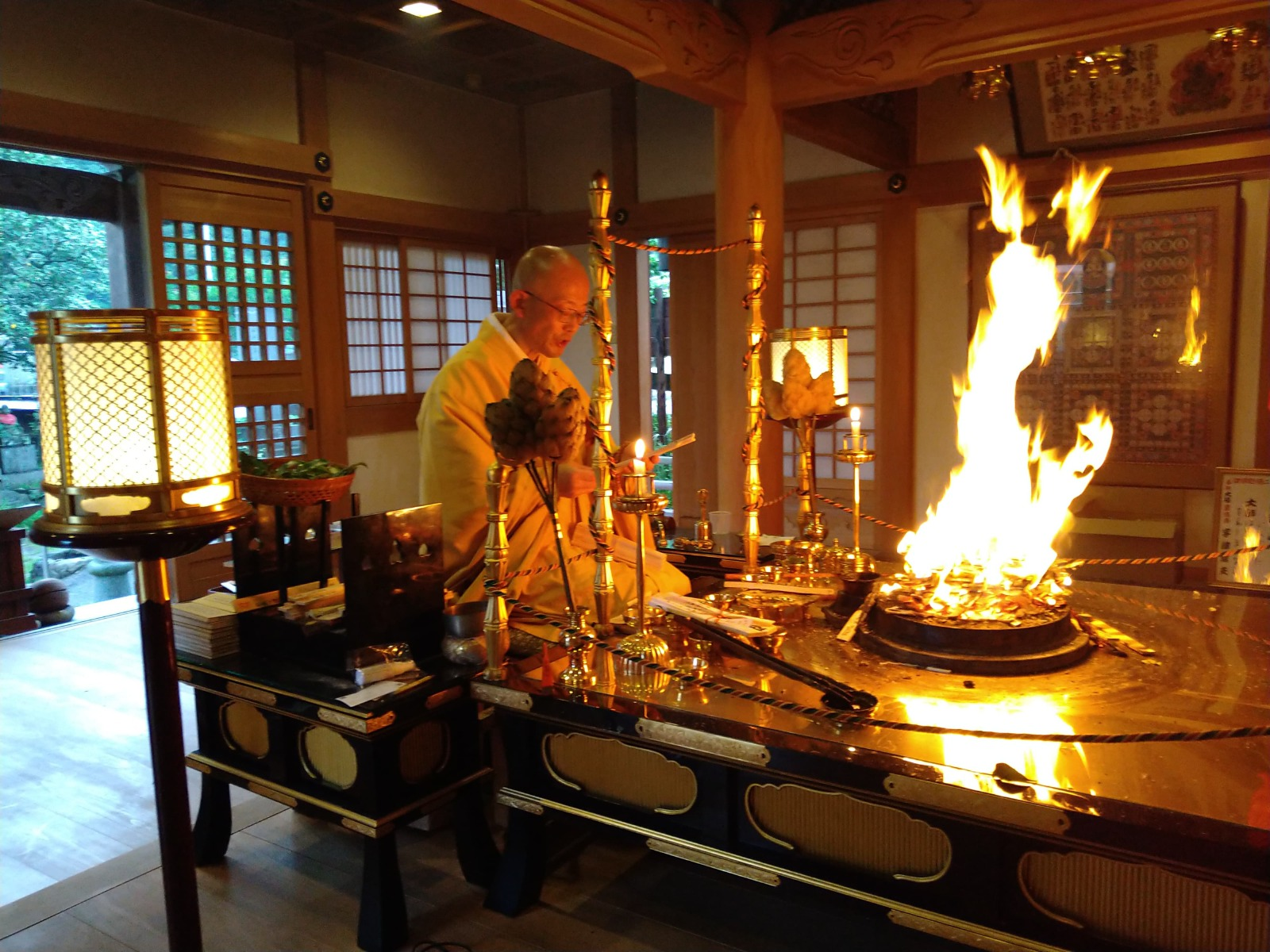
A goma ritual performed Jofuku Temple (常福寺)

The goma (護摩) fire ritual is an important and recognizable ritual in Shingon. Goma has roots in the Vedic homa ritual and this was acknowledged by traditional authors like Yi Xing (8th century). According to Yi Xing:

Buddha created this teaching out of his desire to convert non-Buddhists and allow them to distinguish the true from the false. Thus he taught them the true Goma[...] The Buddha himself taught the very foundation of the Vedas, and in that way manifested the correct principles and method of the true Goma. This is the "Buddha Veda".

Thus, while the Goma resembles Vedic rituals, if properly understood, it communicates the true inner intent of the Buddha. According to the Commentary on the Mahavairocana Sutra: "The meaning of goma is to burn the firewood of delusion with the wisdom flame, consuming it completely."

Goma is performed by qualified priests and acharyas for the benefit of individuals, the state or all sentient beings in general. The consecrated fire is believed to have a powerful cleansing effect, since esoteric Buddhist sources like Yi Xing consider the goma fire to be the purifying wisdom of the Buddha; hence, the ritual is performed for the purpose of destroying detrimental thoughts and desires, and for the making of secular requests and blessings. The central deity invoked herein is usually Acala (Fudō Myōō 不動明王). The ritual is performed in most major Shingon temples; larger scale ceremonies often include the constant beating of taiko drums and mass chanting of the mantra of Acala by priests and lay practitioners.

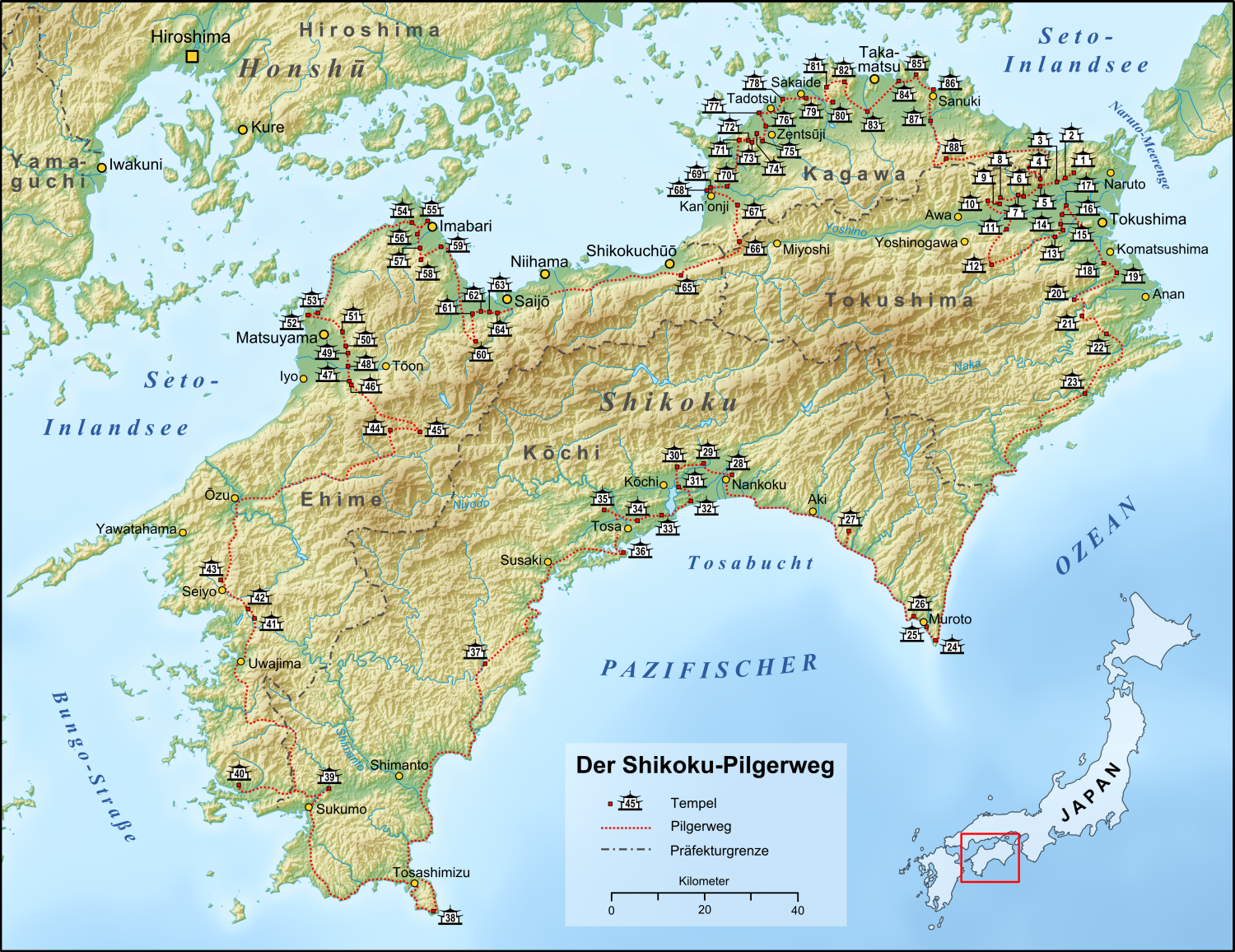
Map of the 88 temples along the Shikoku Pilgrimage

Adopting the practice from Shingon Buddhism, adherents the syncretic Japanese religion of Shugendō (修験道) also practice the goma ritual, of which two types are prominent: the saido dai goma and hashiramoto goma rituals. The goma ritual was also adopted by other schools of Japanese Buddhism, and it is still practiced in some Zen temples.

=== Pilgrimage ===
The practice of making pilgrimage to holy sites, especially to mountains which were seen as the homes of deities, developed throughout the history of Shingon and many pilgrimage routes remain a key part of Shingon practice today. One such pilgrimage route is the Shikoku pilgrimage which is associated with devotion to Kūkai and includes a total of 88 locales.

== Pantheon ==
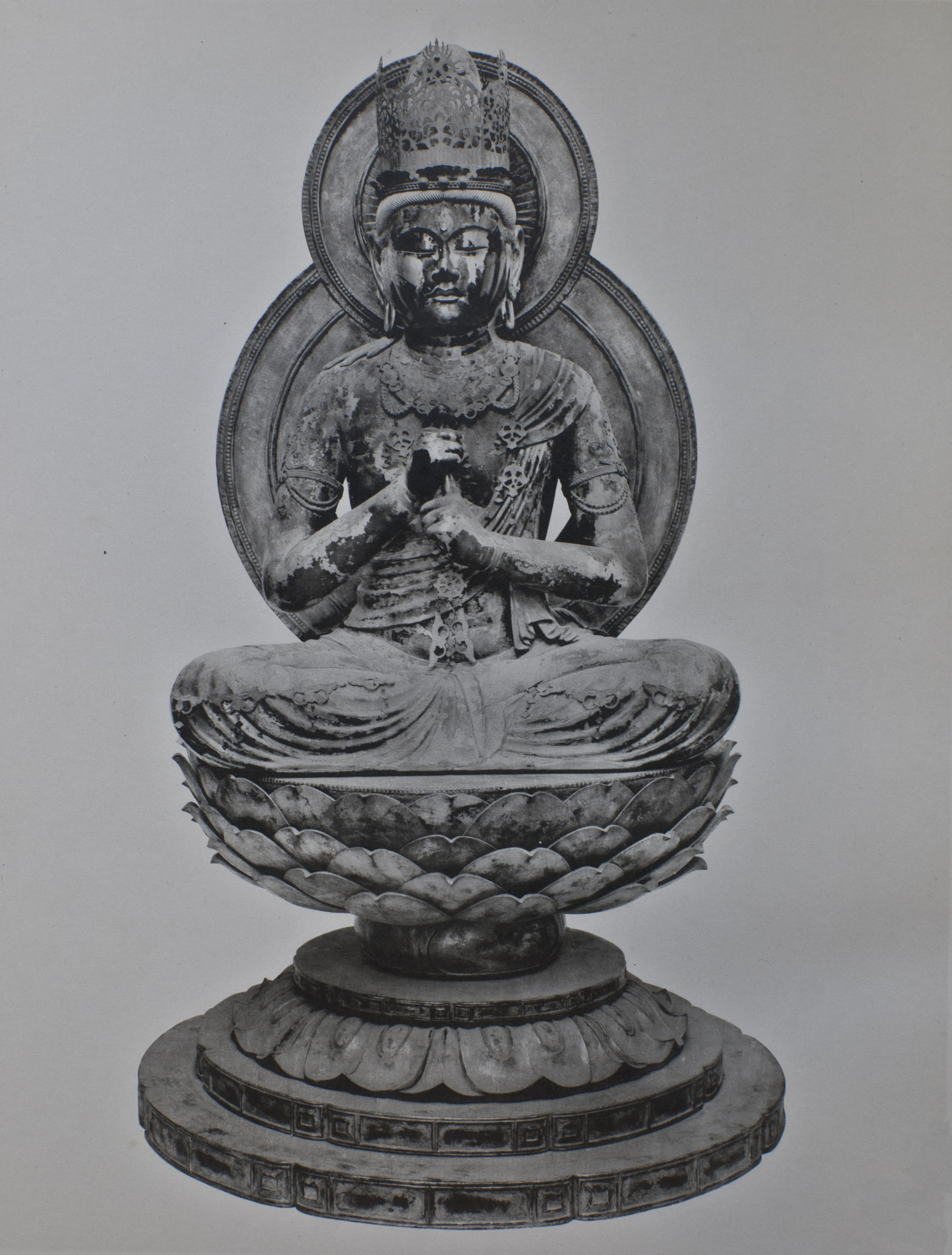
A Kamakura era statue of Dainichi Nyorai by Unkei at Enjō-ji

Fudō Myōō (Acala), the wrathful manifestation of Mahavairocana, and the principal deity invoked during the goma fire ritual.

The Shingon pantheon includes numerous Buddhist deities. Many of these deities have vital roles as they are regularly invoked by the practitioner for various rituals like the homa fire ritual and in liturgical services.

In Shingon, divine beings are grouped into six main classes: Buddhas (Butsu 仏), Bodhisattvas (Bosatsu 菩薩), Wisdom Kings (Vidyaraja, Myōō 明王), Devas (Ten 天), Buddha emanations (Sanskrit: nirmāṇakāya, Keshin 化身) and Patriarchs (Soshi 祖師).

=== The Thirteen Buddhas ===
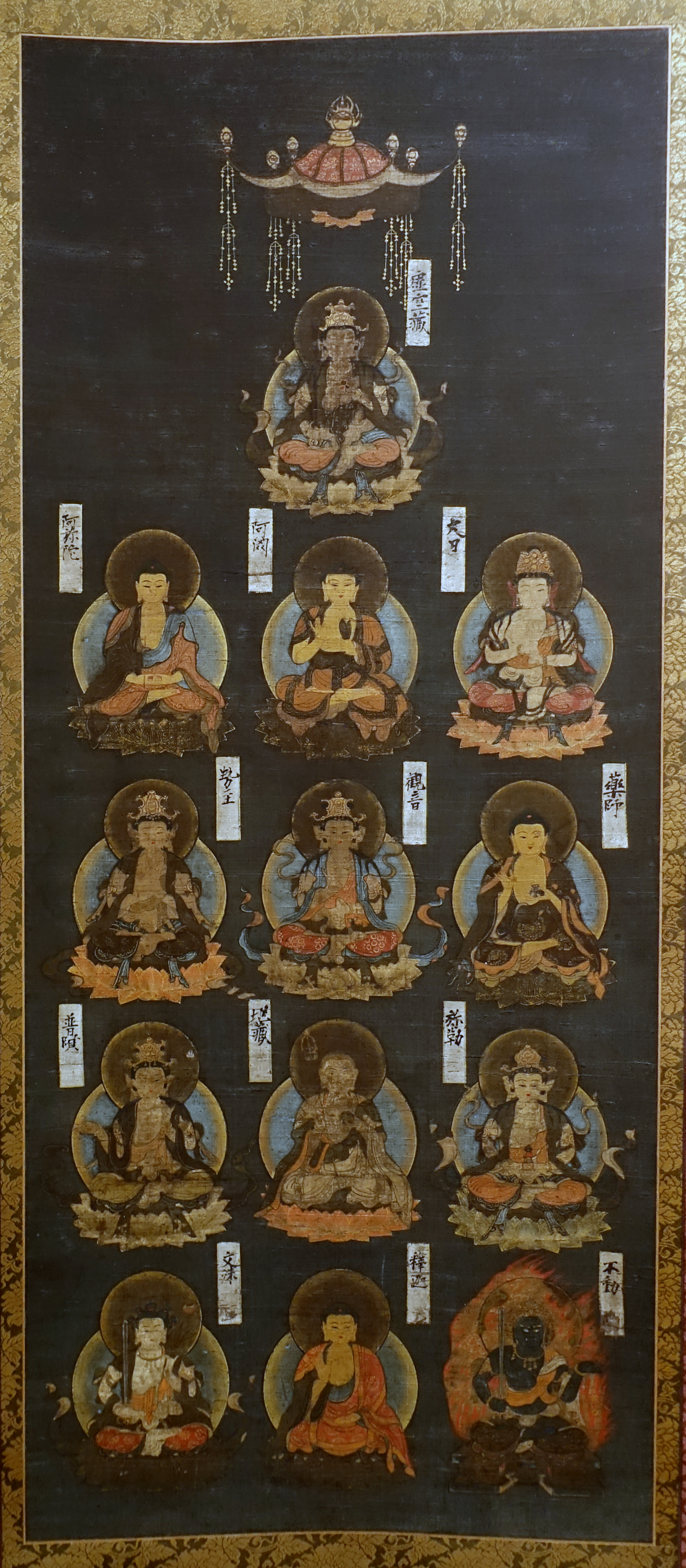
Silk painting of the Thirteen Deities, Nambokucho-Muromachi period

The most important set of deities in Shingon is called the Thirteen Buddhas (十三仏, Jūsanbutsu), which is actually a grouping of Buddhas, bodhisattvas and Wisdom Kings which are found in the womb-realm and vajra-realm mandalas.

They are widely invoked in several liturgies and rituals, including the popular Thirteen Buddha Rites (十三仏事, jūsan butsuji) that are associated with the deceased and with merit making. Each figure also has their own mantra and seed syllable in Shingon which are used in these rituals. Thirteen Buddha Rites became popular throughout Japanese Buddhism during the Edo Period and .

The thirteen buddhas (more accurately "thirteen deities") along with their mantras and seed syllables (bīja) are:

- Wisdom King Acala (Fudō Myōō 不動明王), Bīja: Hāṃ; Sanskrit mantra: namaḥ samanta vajrāṇāṃ caṇḍa mahāroṣaṇa sphoṭaya hūṃ traṭ hāṃ māṃ (Shingon transliteration: nōmaku samanda bazaratan senda makaroshada sowataya untarata kanman)
- Gautama Buddha (Shaka-Nyorai 釈迦如来), Bīja: Bhaḥ; Mantra: namaḥ samanta buddhānāṃ bhaḥ (nōmaku sanmanda bodanan baku)
- Mañjuśrī Bodhisattva (Monju-Bosatsu 文殊菩薩), Bīja: Maṃ; Mantra: oṃ a ra pa ca na (on arahashanō)
- Samantabhadra Bodhisattva (Fugen-Bosatsu 普賢菩薩), Bīja: Aṃ; Mantra: oṃ samayas tvaṃ (on sanmaya satoban)
- Kṣitigarbha Bodhisattva (Jizō-Bosatsu 地蔵菩薩), Bīja: Ha; Mantra: oṃ ha ha ha vismaye svāhā (on kakaka bisanmaei sowaka)
- Maitreya Bodhisattva (Miroku-Bosatsu 弥勒菩薩), Bīja: Yu; Mantra: oṃ maitreya svāhā (on maitareiya sowaka)
- Bhaiṣajyaguru Buddha (Yakushi-Nyorai 薬師如來), Bīja: Bhai; Mantra: oṃ huru huru caṇḍāli mātangi svāhā (on korokoro sendari matōgi sowaka)
- Avalokiteśvara Bodhisattva (Kannon-Bosatsu 観音菩薩), Bīja: Sa; Mantra: oṃ ārolik svāhā (on arorikya sowaka)
- Mahāsthāmaprāpta Bodhisattva (Seishi-Bosatsu 勢至菩薩), Bīja: Saḥ; Mantra: oṃ saṃ jaṃ jaṃ saḥ svāhā (on san zan saku sowaka)
- Amitābha Buddha (Amida-Nyorai 阿弥陀如来), Bīja: Trāḥ; Mantra: oṃ amṛta teje hara hūṃ (on amirita teisei kara un)
- Akṣobhya Buddha (Ashuku-Nyorai 阿閦如来), Bīja: Hūṃ; Mantra: oṃ akṣobhya hūṃ (on akishubiya un)
- Mahavairocana Buddha (Dainichi-Nyorai 大日如来), Bīja: A; Mantra: oṃ a vi ra hūṃ khaṃ vajradhātu vaṃ (on abiraunken basara datoban)
- Ākāśagarbha Bodhisattva (Kokūzō-Bosatsu 虚空蔵菩薩), Bīja: Trāḥ; Mantra: namo ākāśagarbhāya oṃ ārya kāmāri mauli svāhā (nōbō akyasha kyarabaya on ari kyamari bori sowaka)

=== Other deities ===
The "Five Great Wisdom Kings" (Godai Myō-ō, 五大明王) are wrathful manifestations of the Five Buddhas:

- Acala or Acalanatha (Fudō Myōō 不動明王) "The Immovable One" – Manifestation of Buddha Mahavairocana
- Amrtakundalin (Gundari Myōō 軍荼利明王) "The Dispenser of Heavenly Nectar" – Manifestation of Buddha Ratnasambhava
- Trailokyavijaya (Gōzanze Myōō 降三世明王) "The Conqueror of The Three Planes" – Manifestation of Buddha Akshobhya
- Yamāntaka (Daiitoku Myōō 大威徳明王) "The Defeater of Death" – Manifestation of Buddha Amitabha
- Vajrayaksa (Kongō Yasha Myōō 金剛夜叉明王) "The Devourer of Demons" – Manifestation of Buddha Amoghasiddhi

There are numerous Indian Buddhist deities found in the Shingon pantheon and in Shingon mandalas. They include figures like Indra (Taishakuten 帝釈天), Prthivi (Jiten 地天, Goddess of the Earth), Maheshvara (Daijizaiten 大自在天 or Ishanaten 伊舎那天), Marici (Marishi-Ten 摩里支天), Mahakala (Daikokuten 大黒天 Patron deity of Wealth) and Saraswati (Benzaiten 弁財天 Patron deity of Knowledge, Art and Music).

Apart from Indian Buddhist deities, there are also many Shinto deities which were assimilated into Shingon Buddhism, like Hachiman, Inari Ōkami and the sun goddess Amaterasu.

== Lineage ==
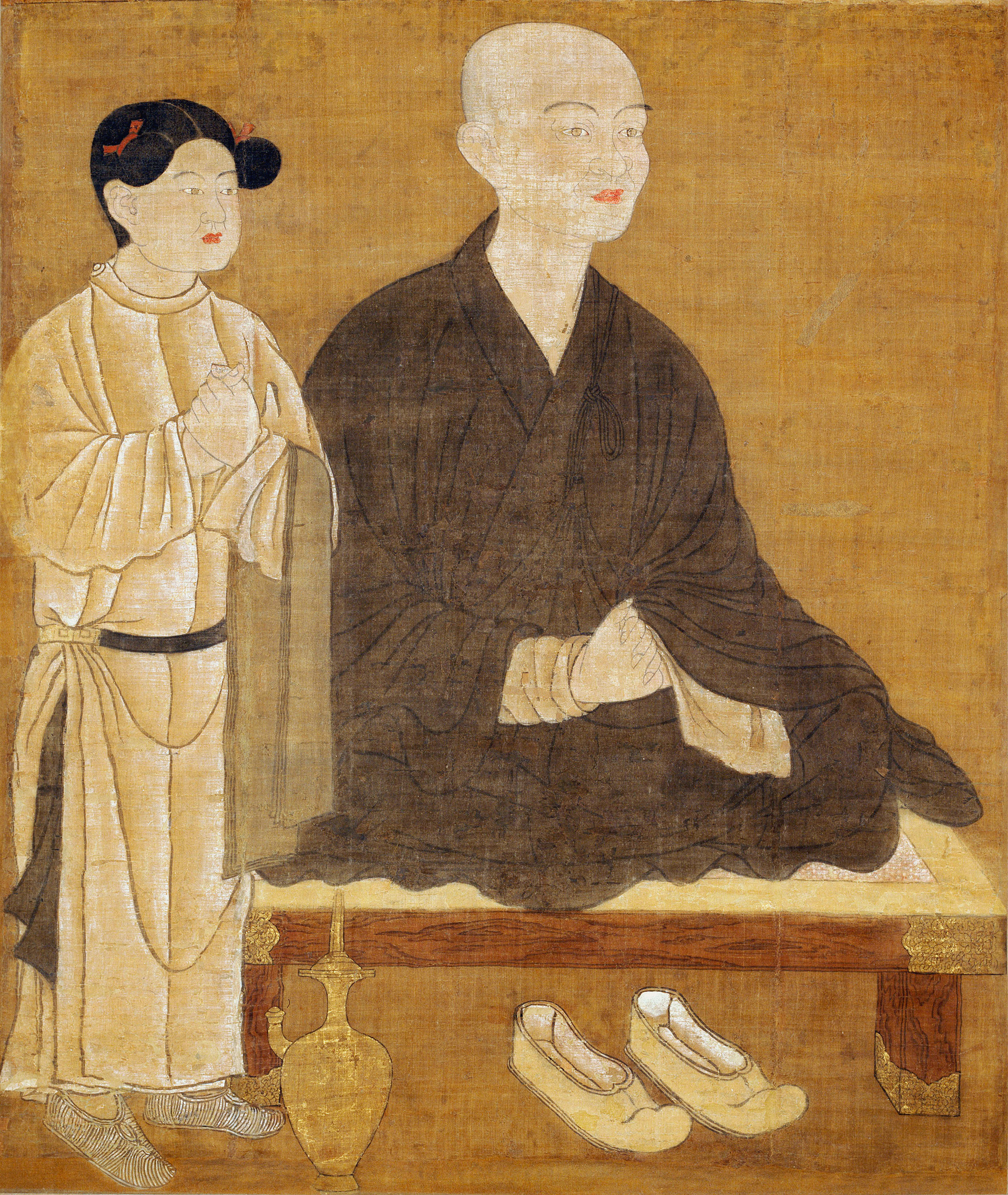
Painting of Hui Kuo, from a series of artworks entitled Shingon Hassozō (The Eight Patriarchs of Shingon). Japan, Kamakura Period, 13th–14th century.

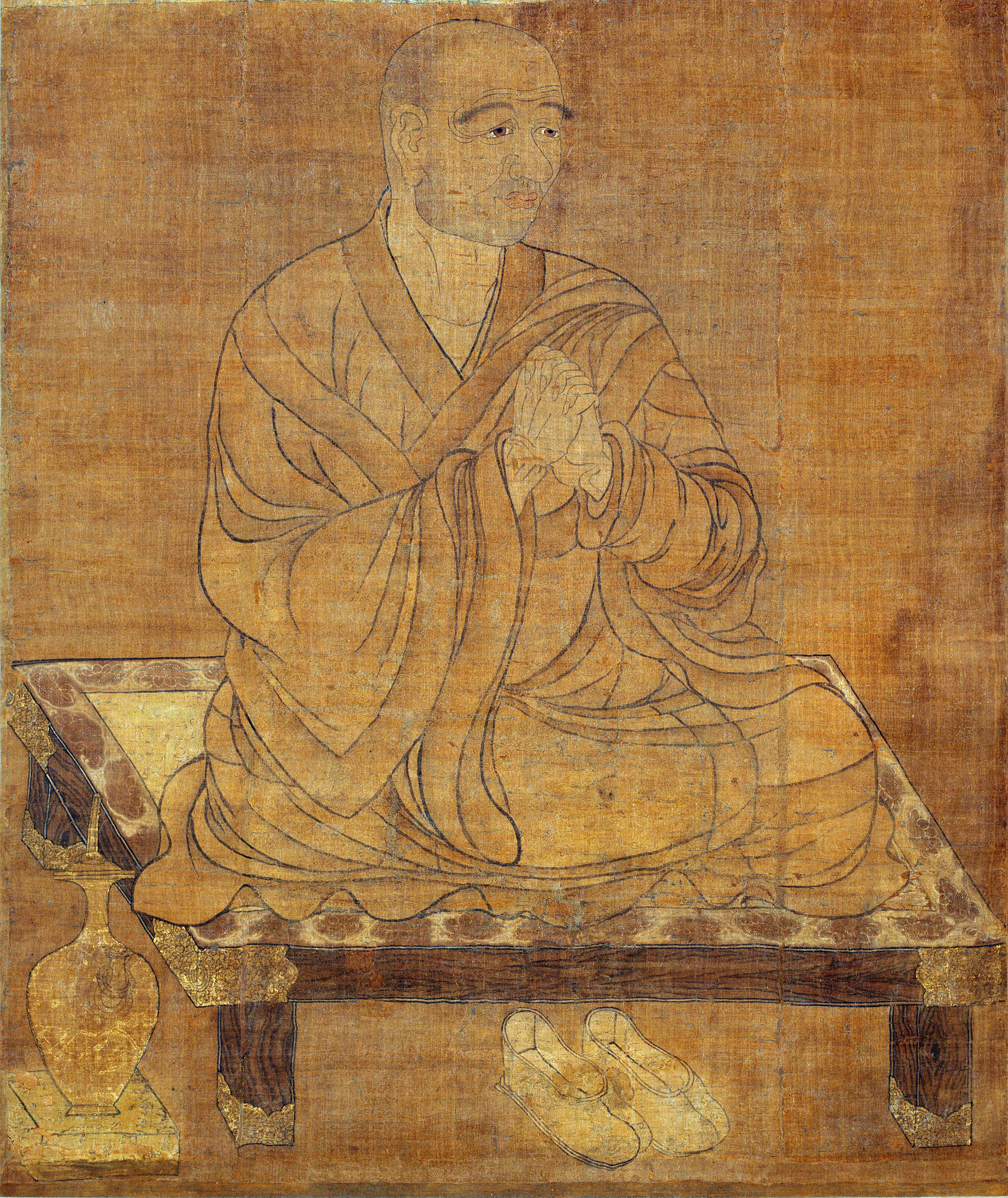
Amoghavajra, from the Shingon Hassozō

The Shingon lineage is an ancient transmission of esoteric Buddhist doctrine that began in India and then spread to China and Japan. Shingon or Orthodox Esoteric Buddhism maintains that the expounder of the doctrine was originally the Universal Buddha Vairocana, but the first human to receive the doctrine was Nagarjuna in India. Like all major East Asian Buddhist tradition, the Shingon tradition developed a list of "patriarchs" which were considered to be the key figures in the transmission of their lineage. Shingon recognizes two groups of eight great patriarchs—one group of lineage holders and one group of great expounders of the doctrine.

The Eight Great Doctrine-Expounding Patriarchs (Fuho-Hasso 付法八祖)

- Amoghavajra (Fukūkongō-Sanzō 不空金剛三蔵)
- Huiguo (Keika-Ajari 恵果阿闍梨)
- Kūkai (Kōbō-Daishi 弘法大師)
- Nagabodhi (Ryūchi-Bosatsu 龍智菩薩)
- Nagarjuna (Ryūju-Bosatsu 龍樹菩薩) – received the Mahavairocana Tantra from Vajrasattva inside an Iron Stupa in Southern India
- Vairocana (Dainichi-Nyorai 大日如来)
- Vajrabodhi (Kongōchi-Sanzō 金剛智三蔵)
- Vajrasattva (Kongō-Satta 金剛薩埵)

The Eight Great Lineage Patriarchs (Denji-Hasso 伝持八祖)

- Amoghavajra (Fukūkongō-Sanzō 不空金剛三蔵)
- Huiguo (Keika-Ajari 恵果阿闍梨)
- Kūkai (Kōbō-Daishi 弘法大師)
- Nagabodhi (Ryūchi-Bosatsu 龍智菩薩)
- Nagarjuna (Ryūju-Bosatsu 龍樹菩薩)
- Śubhakarasiṃha (Zenmui-Sanzō 善無畏三蔵)
- Vajrabodhi (Kongōchi-Sanzō 金剛智三蔵)
- Yi Xing (Ichigyō-Zenji 一行禅師)

== Practice Lineages and Sects ==
In Japan, the lineages of Shingon initiation and practices known as hōryū 法流 came to develop into two major streams: Ono-ryū 小野流 and Hirosawa-ryū 廣澤流, each with multiple respective schools and sub-lineages. The following is a list of some of the schools belonging to each stream, as well as some of their sub-lineages:

- Ono Lineages 小野流
  - Anjōji-ryū 安祥寺流
  - Kajūji‑ryū 勧修寺流
    - Kōmyōzen-ryū 光明山流
  - Zuishinin-ryū 随心院流
  - Daigo 醍醐 Lineages
    - Sanbōin‑ryū 三寶院流
      - Kōhō-gata 光寶方
      - Toko-gata 土巨方
      - Dōkyō-gata 道教方
      - Ikyō-gata 意教方
      - Kōshin-ryū 幸心流
    - Rishōin-ryū 理性院流
    - Kongōō-ryū 金剛王流
  - Chūin‑ryū 中院流
    - Chishōgon'in-gata 智莊嚴院方
    - Shin'nan'in-gata 心南院方
    - Injōin-gata 引擾院方
    - Ingata 院方
    - Chūin-ryū Inge-sōjō 中院流院家相承
  - Koshima-ryū 小嶋流
  - Matsuhashi-ryū 松橋流
- Hirosawa Lineages 廣澤流
  - Go-ryū 御流
  - Nishinoin-ryū 西院流
  - Hojuin‑ryū 保壽院流
    - Kingyoku-gata 金玉方
  - Kezōin-ryū 華蔵院流
  - Ninnikusen-ryū 忍辱山流
  - Denbōin-ryū 傳法院流
  - Jimyōin-ryū 持明院流
  - Jison'in-ryū 慈尊院流
  - Kannon'in-ryū 観音院流
  - Jōren'in 成蓮院
  - Jōkiin-ryū 常喜院流
  - Jōjuin-ryū 成就院流
  - Shinjōin-ryū 真乗院流

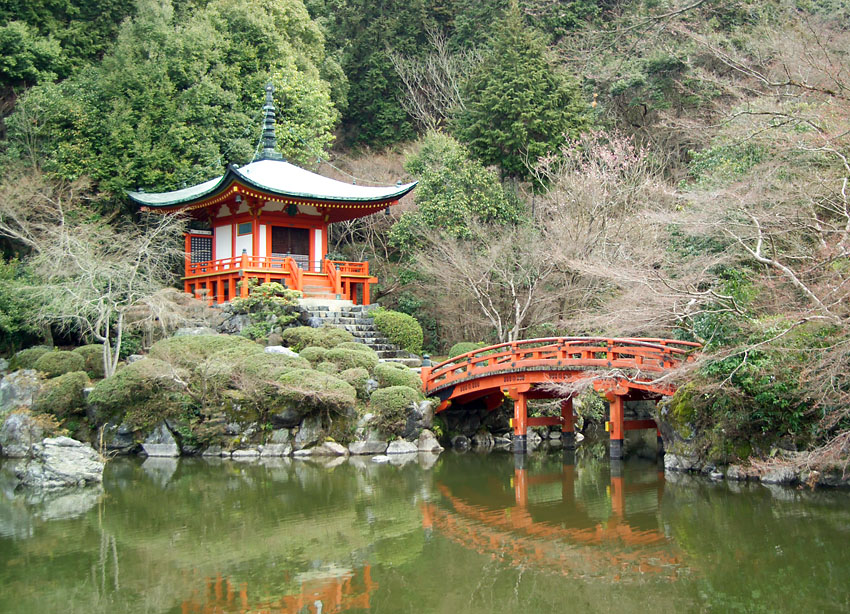
Located in Kyoto, Japan, Daigo-ji is the head temple of the Daigo-ha branch of Shingon Buddhism.

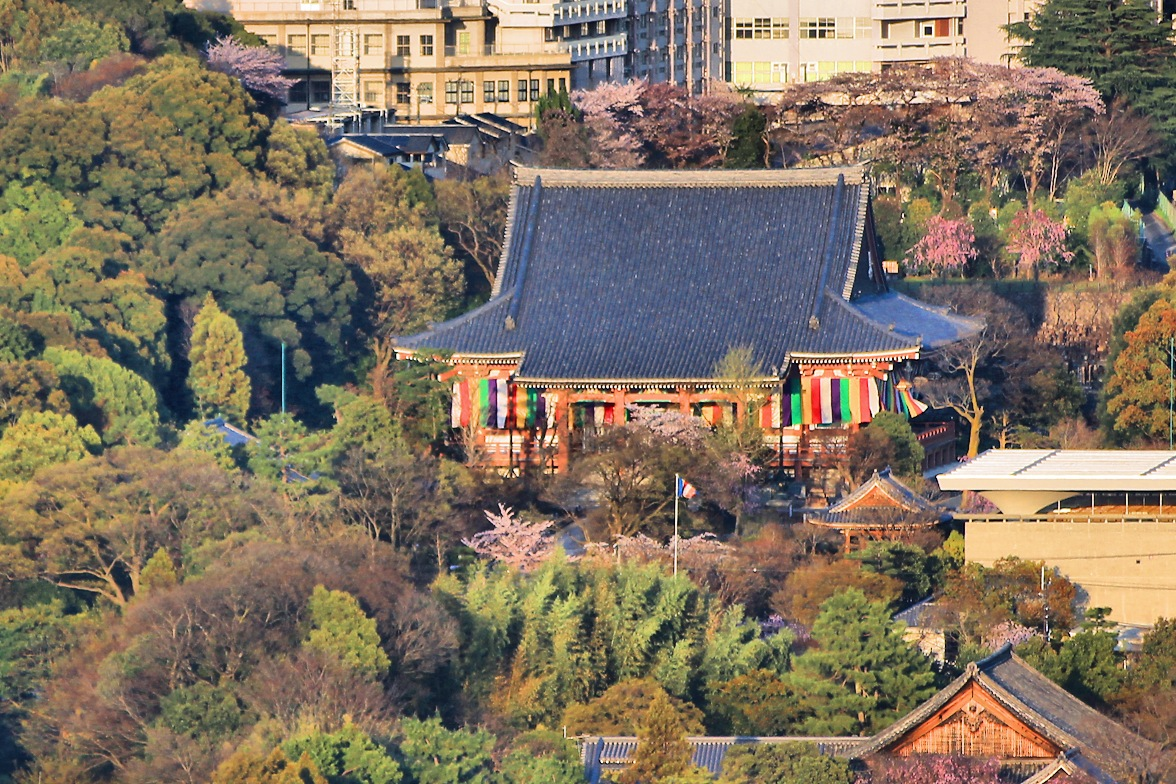
Chishaku-in is the head temple of Shingon-shū Chisan-ha.

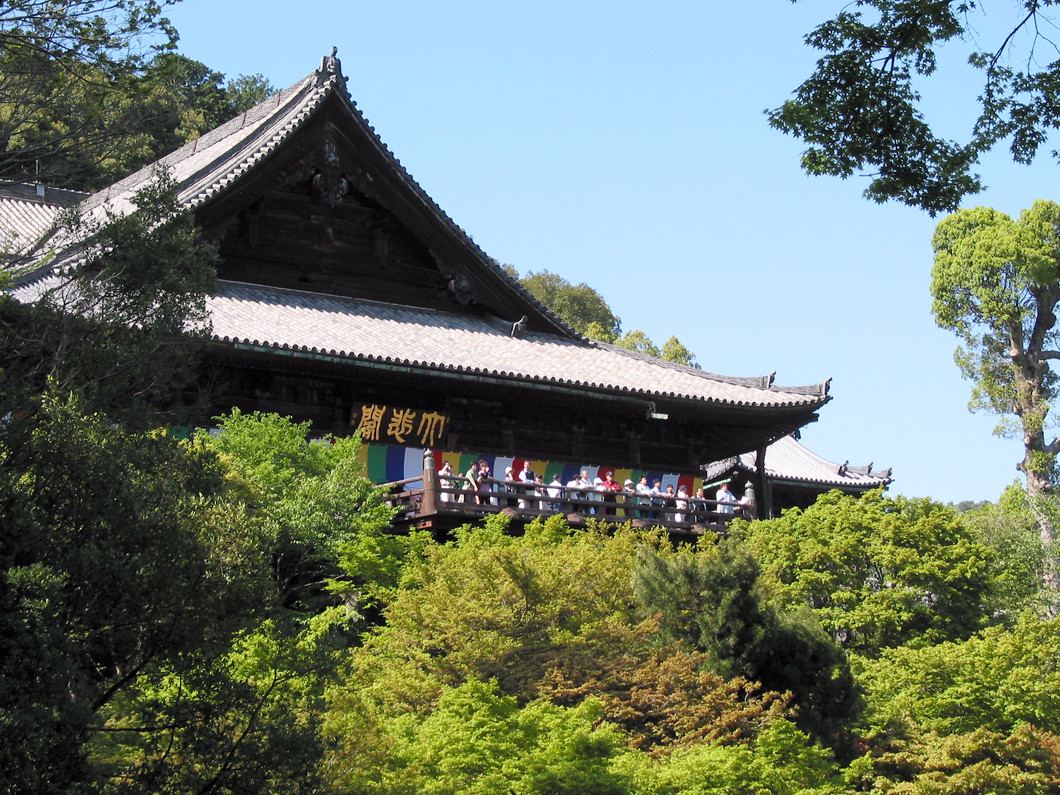
Hasedera in Sakurai, Nara, is the head temple of Shingon-shū Buzan-ha.

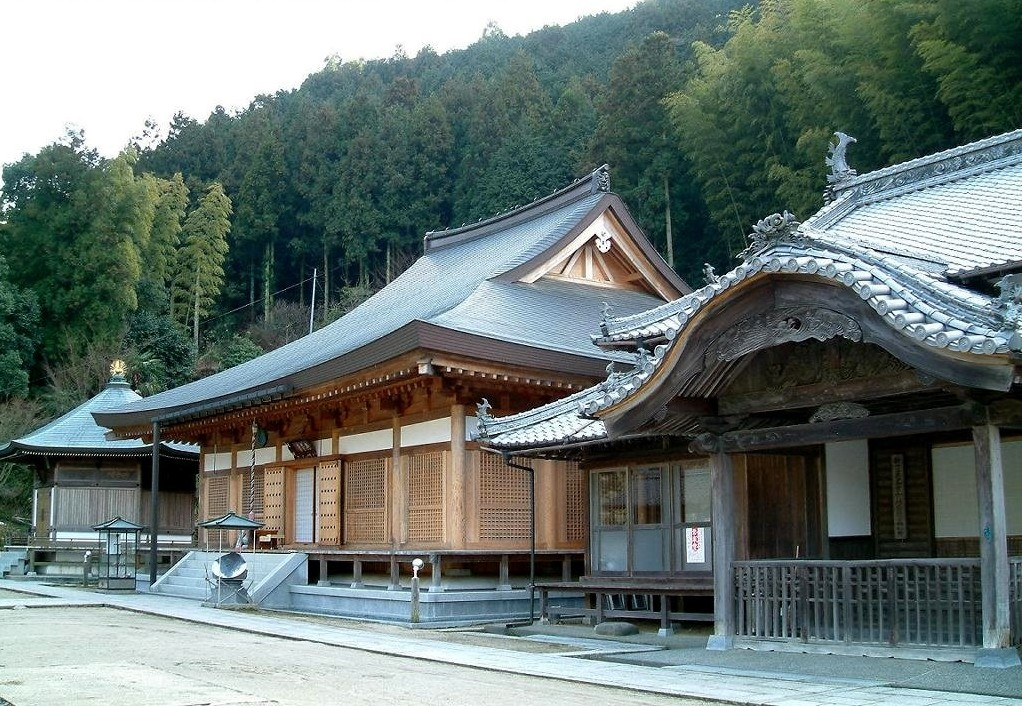
The main hall of Gokuraku-ji, the head temple of the Ishizuchisan sect

As the Tokugawa Shogunate began to make efforts to exert its power over temple complexes such as compelling temple-shrine complexes to systematize their internal regulations (hatto 法度) in 1601, exoteric and esoteric traditions alike were affected. To keep in line with government policy, Shingon temples highlighted the differences between Kogi Shingon 古義真言宗 and Shingi Shingon 新義真言宗, and projected these differences onto the distinct temple complexes on Kōyasan and the Chisan and Buzan temples. These distinctions became what Drummond refers to as, "'brand names' of 'Old Doctrine' Shingon and 'New Doctrine' Shingon beyond actual fundamental doctrinal and ritual differences." Additionally, while it may be tempting to believe that as temples transitioned to head and branch temple organizations from the earlier lineage-based affiliations, that there would be clear sectarian boundaries, Ambros writes, "even though the Tokugawa regime established sectarian hierarchies in the seventeenth century, the institutional relationships between the Shingon schools remained completely intertwined." Ambros notes that despite the Kogi and Shingi division, temple networks associated with Kogi temples such as Daigoji or Tōji remained connected, even as they formally became associated with Shingi Shingon. These connections cut across sectarian boundaries because the temples had been connected with each other through their ritual lineages since the medieval period, and were only later identified themselves as Kogi or Shingi.

- The Orthodox (Kogi) Shingon School (古義真言宗)
  - Kōyasan (高野山真言宗)
    - Chuin-Ryu Lineage (中院流, decided after World War II)
    - Nishinoin-Ryu Nozen-Gata Kōya-Sojo Lineage (西院流能禅方高野相承, already extinct)
    - Nishinoin-Ryu Genyu-Gata Kōya-Sojo Lineage (西院流元瑜方高野相承, already extinct)
    - Nishinoin-Ryu Enyu-Gata Kōya-Sojo Lineage (西院流円祐方高野相承, already extinct)
    - Samboin-Ryu Kenjin-Gata Kōya-Sojo Lineage (三宝院流憲深方高野相承, almost extinct)
    - Samboin-Ryu Ikyo-Gata Kōya-Sojo Lineage (三宝院流意教方, almost extinct)
    - Samboin-Ryu Shingen-Gata Kōya-Sojo Lineage (三宝院流真源相承, almost extinct)
    - Anshoji-Ryu Lineage (安祥寺流, almost extinct)
    - Chuinhon-Ryu Lineage (中院本流, almost extinct)
    - Jimyoin-Ryu Lineage (持明院流, almost extinct)
  - Reiunji-ha (真言宗霊雲寺派)
    - Shinanshoji-Ryu Lineage (新安祥寺流, established by Jogon (浄厳, 1639–1702))
  - Zentsūji-ha (真言宗善通寺派)
    - Jizoin-Ryu Lineage (地蔵院流, already extinct)
    - Zuishinin-Ryu Lineage (随心院流, since Meiji era)
  - Daigo-ha (真言宗醍醐派)
    - Samboin-Ryu Jozei-Gata Lineage (三宝院流定済方)
    - Samboin-Ryu Kenjin-Gata Lineage (三宝院流憲深方, already extinct)
    - Rishoin-Ryu Lineage (理性院流, already extinct)
    - Kongoouin-Ryu Lineage (金剛王院流, already extinct)
    - Jizoin-Ryu Lineage (地蔵院流, already extinct)
  - Omuro-ha (真言宗御室派)
    - Nishinoin-Ryu Enyu-Gata Lineage (西院流円祐方)
  - Shingon-Ritsu (真言律宗)
    - Saidaiji-Ryu Lineage (already extinct) (西大寺流)
    - Samboin-Ryu Kenjin-Gata Lineage (三宝院流憲深方)
  - Daikakuji-ha (真言宗大覚寺派)
    - Samboin-Ryu Kenjin-Gata Lineage (三宝院流憲深方, already extinct)
    - Hojuin-Ryu Lineage (保寿院流, since Heisei era)
  - Sennyūji-ha (真言宗泉涌寺派)
    - Zuishinin-Ryu Lineage (随心院流)
  - Yamashina-ha (真言宗山階派)
    - Kajuji-Ryu Lineage (勧修寺流)
  - Shigisan (信貴山真言宗)
    - Chuin-Ryu Lineage (中院流)
  - Nakayamadera-ha (真言宗中山寺派)
    - Chuin-Ryu Lineage (中院流)
  - Sanbōshū (真言三宝宗)
    - Chuin-Ryu Lineage (中院流)
  - Sumadera-ha (真言宗須磨寺派)
    - Chuin-Ryu Lineage (中院流)
  - Tōji-ha (真言宗東寺派)
    - Nishinoin-Ryu Nozen-Gata Lineage (西院流能禅方)
  - Ishizuchisan(石鎚山真言宗）
    - Samboin-Ryu Kenjin-Gata Lineage (三宝院流憲深方)
    - Kajuji-Ryu Lineage (勧修寺流)
- The Reformed (Shingi) Shingon School (新義真言宗)
  - Shingon-shu Negoroji (根来寺)
    - Daidenboin-Ryu Lineage (大伝法院流)
    - Chushoin-Ryu Lineage (中性院流, selected individuals)
  - Chisan-ha (真言宗智山派)
    - Chushoin-Ryu Lineage (中性院流)
    - Samboin-Ryu Nisshu-Sojo (三宝院流日秀相承)
  - Buzan-ha (真言宗豊山派)
    - Samboin-Ryu Kenjin-Gata Lineage (三宝院流憲深方, already extinct)
    - Chushoin-Ryu Lineage (中性院流)
    - Daidenboin-Ryu Lineage (大伝法院流, since Meiji era)
  - Kokubunji-ha (真言宗国分寺派)
  - Inunaki-ha (真言宗犬鳴派)

== See also ==
- Chinese Buddhism
- Eastern esotericism
- Religion in Asia
- Religion in Japan
- Shinjō Itō
- Shinnyo-en
- Sokushinbutsu
- Tachikawa-ryu
- Tangmi

== Bibliography ==
- Arai, Yusei (1997). Koyasan Shingon Buddhism: A Handbook for Followers, Japan: Koyasan Shingon Mission, ISBN 4-9900581-1-9.
- Bowring, Richard (2008). The Religious Traditions of Japan: 500–1600. Cambridge, UK: Cambridge University Press.
- BDK (2015), Esoteric Texts, Bukkyō Dendō Kyōkai America Incorporated.
- Chandra, Lokesh (2003). The Esoteric Iconography of Japanese Mandalas, International Academy of Indian Culture and Aditya Prakashan, New Delhi, ISBN 81-86471-93-6
- Dreitlein, Eijo (2011). Shido Kegyo Shidai, Japan.
- Dreitlein, Eijo (2011). Beginner's Handbook for the Shido Kegyo of Chuin-ryu, Japan.
- Giebel, Rolf W.; Todaro, Dale A.; transl. (2004). Shingon Texts, Berkeley, Calif.: Numata Center for Buddhist Translation and Research. ISBN 1886439249
- Giebel, Rolf, transl. (2006), The Vairocanābhisaṃbodhi Sutra, Numata Center for Buddhist Translation and Research, Berkeley, ISBN 978-1-886439-32-0
- Giebel, Rolf, transl. (2006). Two Esoteric Sutras: The Adamantine Pinnacle Sutra (T 18, no 865), The Susiddhikara Sutra (T 18, no 893), Berkeley: Numata Center for Buddhist Translation and Research. ISBN 1-886439-15-X
- Hakeda, Yoshito S., transl. (1972). Kukai: Major Works, Translated, With an Account of His Life and a Study of His Thought, New York: Columbia University Press, ISBN 0-231-03627-2.
- Matsunaga, Daigan; and Matsunaga, Alicia (1974). Foundation of Japanese Buddhism, Vol. I: The Aristocratic Age. Buddhist Books International, Los Angeles und Tokio. ISBN 0-914910-25-6.
- Kiyota, Minoru (1978). Shingon Buddhism: Theory and Practice. Los Angeles/Tokyo: Buddhist Books International.
- Payne, Richard K. (2004). "Ritual Syntax and Cognitive Theory", Pacific World Journal, Third Series, No 6, 105–227.
- Toki, Hôryû; Kawamura, Seiichi, tr, (1899). "Si-do-in-dzou; gestes de l'officiant dans les cérémonies mystiques des sectes Tendaï et Singon", Paris, E. Leroux.
- Miyata, Taisen (1998). A Study of the Ritual Mudras in the Shingon Tradition and Their Symbolism.
- Maeda, Shuwa (2019). The Ritual Books of Four Preliminary Practices: Sambo-in Lineage Kenjin School, Japan.
- Orzech, Charles D; Sorensen, Henrik Hjort; Payne, Richard Karl (2011). Esoteric Buddhism and the tantras in East Asia. Leiden; Boston: Brill. doi:10.1163/ej.9789004184916.i-1200. ISBN 978-90-04-20401-0. OCLC 731667667.
- Yamasaki, Taiko (1988). Shingon: Japanese Esoteric Buddhism, Boston/London: Shambala Publications..
