= Bengang =

- Location within Borneo
- Coordinates: 1.41667°N 111.5°E
- Country: Malaysia
- State: Sarawak
- Elevation: 84 m (276 ft)

Bengang is a settlement in Sarawak, Malaysia. It lies approximately 131.1 kilometres (81 mi) east of the state capital Kuching.

Neighbouring settlements include:

- Pok 0 kilometres (0.0 mi) north
- Serian 1.9 kilometres (1.2 mi) north
- Semumoh 1.9 kilometres (1.2 mi) east
- Ban 1.9 kilometres (1.2 mi) south
- Salulap 2.6 kilometres (1.6 mi) northeast
- Melaban 2.6 kilometres (1.6 mi) southeast
- Betong 2.6 kilometres (1.6 mi) southeast
- Empaong 3.7 kilometres (2.3 mi) east
