= Nyelutong =

- Location within Borneo
- Coordinates: 1.36667°N 111.55°E
- Country: Malaysia
- State: Sarawak
- Administrative Division: Betong
- Elevation: 99 m (325 ft)

Nyelutong is a settlement in the Betong division of Sarawak, Malaysia. It lies approximately 137.5 kilometres (85 mi) east of the state capital Kuching.

Neighbouring settlements include:

- Saka 1.9 kilometres (1.2 mi) north
- Tansang 2.6 kilometres (1.6 mi) northwest
- Penurin 3.7 kilometres (2.3 mi) north
- Remabong 4.1 kilometres (2.5 mi) northeast
- Maja 4.1 kilometres (2.5 mi) northeast
- Bukong 4.1 kilometres (2.5 mi) southeast
- Melaban 5.2 kilometres (3.2 mi) northwest
- Betong 5.2 kilometres (3.2 mi) northwest
