= Remabong =

- Location within Borneo
- Coordinates: 1.38333°N 111.58333°E
- Country: Malaysia
- State: Sarawak
- Elevation: 186 m (610 ft)

Remabong is a settlement in Sarawak, Malaysia. It lies approximately 140.8 kilometres (87 mi) east of the state capital Kuching.

Neighbouring settlements include:

- Maja 2.6 kilometres (1.6 mi) northwest
- Saka 3.7 kilometres (2.3 mi) west
- Pematoh 3.7 kilometres (2.3 mi) east
- Kundong 3.7 kilometres (2.3 mi) north
- Nanga Geraji 3.7 kilometres (2.3 mi) north
- Geraji Atas 3.7 kilometres (2.3 mi) north
- Nyelutong 4.1 kilometres (2.5 mi) southwest
- Penurin 4.1 kilometres (2.5 mi) northwest
- Bedanum 4.1 kilometres (2.5 mi) northwest
- Nanga Padeh 4.1 kilometres (2.5 mi) northwest
