= Tansang =

- Location within Borneo
- Coordinates: 1.38333°N 111.53333°E
- Country: Malaysia
- State: Sarawak
- Administrative Division: Betong
- Elevation: 99 m (325 ft)

Tansang is a settlement in the Betong division of Sarawak, Malaysia. It lies approximately 135.3 kilometres (84 mi) east of the state capital Kuching.

Neighbouring settlements include:

- Saka 1.9 kilometres (1.2 mi) east
- Betong 2.6 kilometres (1.6 mi) northwest
- Melaban 2.6 kilometres (1.6 mi) northwest
- Nyelutong 2.6 kilometres (1.6 mi) southeast
- Penurin 2.6 kilometres (1.6 mi) northeast
- Empaong 3.7 kilometres (2.3 mi) north
- Ban 4.1 kilometres (2.5 mi) northwest
- Maja 4.1 kilometres (2.5 mi) northeast
