= Daxingshan Temple =

Notable Buddhist temple in Xi'an, China

- 大兴善寺
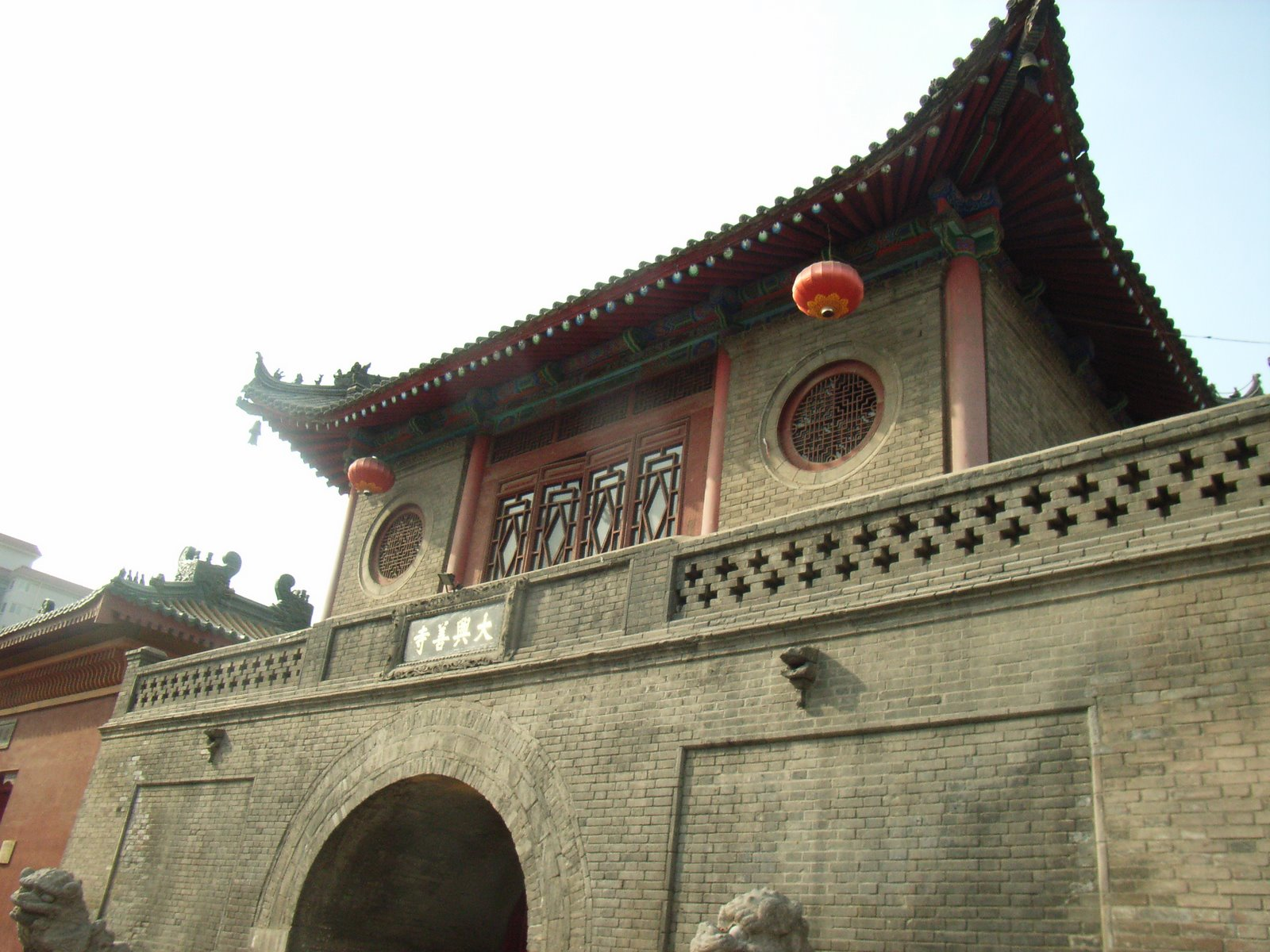
- The Shanmen at the temple.

Religion
- Affiliation: Buddhism
- Sect: Chinese Esoteric Buddhism
- Leadership: Shi Kuanxu (释宽旭)

Location
- Location: Yanta District, Xi'an, Shaanxi
- Country: China
- Interactive map of Daxingshan Temple
- Coordinates: 34°14′00″N 108°57′00″E

Architecture
- Style: Chinese architecture
- Founder: Emperor Wu of Jin
- Established: 266
- Completed: 15th century (reconstruction)

Daxingshan Temple (simplified Chinese: 大兴善寺; traditional Chinese: 大興善寺; pinyin: Dàxīngshàn Sì) is a Buddhist temple located in Yanta District of Xi'an, Shaanxi.

The temple had reached unprecedented heyday in the Tang dynasty (618–907), when Śubhakarasiṃha, Vajrabodhi and Amoghavajra taught Chinese Esoteric Buddhism in the temple, known as the "Three Prominent Buddhist Monks in the Kaiyuan Period" (开元三大士). Then Japanese Buddhist monks Ennin and Enchin introduced it to Japan, since then, Daxingshan Temple became the cradle of Chinese Esoteric Buddhism. Daxingshan Temple, Daci'en Temple and Jianfu Temple became the three sutras translation sites (三大译经场) in the Tang dynasty.

Daxingshan Temple was completely damaged in the Great Anti-Buddhist Persecution, after the fall of the Tang dynasty in 907, most parts of the temple were ruined in wars and natural disasters, and gradually it became unknown to public. Most of the present structures in the temple were repaired or built during the Ming dynasty (1368–1644) and in modern China.

== History ==
=== Western Jin dynasty ===
Daxingshan Temple was first construction as "Zunshan Temple" (遵善寺) in 266 by Emperor Wu of the Western Jin dynasty (266–420).

=== Northern Zhou dynasty ===
In the mid-6th century, Emperor Ming of Northern Zhou dynasty (557–581) founded the Zhigu Temple (陟岵寺) at the site of Zunshan Temple to commemorate his father-in-law.

=== Sui dynasty ===
In 582, Emperor Wen of Sui dynasty (581–618) ordered to relocate the temple to Chang'an, and renamed "Daxingshan Temple". Huiyuan (慧遠), Huizang (慧藏), Sengxiu (僧休), Baozhen (寶鎮), Hongzun (洪遵) and Tanqian (曇遷), known as the "Six Prominent Buddhist Monks", settled at the temple under the command of the emperor.

=== Tang dynasty ===
In the reign of Emperor Zhongzong of the Tang dynasty (684), to commemorate his father Wei Xuanzhen, Empress Wei renamed the temple "Fengguo Temple" (酆国寺). In 710, the temple restored the original name.

From 716 to 720, during the Kaiyuan period (713–741), Śubhakarasiṃha, Vajrabodhi and Amoghavajra resided in the temple, where they translated Buddhist sutras and disseminated Chinese Esoteric Buddhism. Japanese Buddhist monks Ennin and Enchin received Chinese Esoteric Buddhism and introduced it from China to Japan. In 756, Amoghavajra was proposed as the new abbot of Daxingshan Temple. He was awarded the title of Guoshi (國師), meaning "Teacher of the Empire", by the Tang emperors Xuanzong (712–756), Suzong (756–763) and Daizong (763–779).

Since Emperor Wuzong (841–846) believed in Taoism, he ordered to demolish Buddhist temples, confiscate temple lands and force monks to return to secular life. Daxingshan Temple was destroyed in this movement.

After the fall of the Tang dynasty, Daxingshan Temple fell into oblivion.

=== Ming dynasty ===
During the Yongle era (1403–1424) of the Ming dynasty (1368–1644), monk Yunfeng (云峰) settled at Daxingshan Temple, he supervised the construction of halls and drum tower, and preached Chan Buddhism there.

=== Qing dynasty ===
During the Qing dynasty (1644–1911), the temple underwent three renovations, respectively in the ruling of Shunzhi Emperor (1648) and in the reign of Kangxi Emperor (1694) and in the Tongzhi period (1862–1874). But the temple was badly damaged during the Taiping Rebellion.

=== Republic of China ===
In 1943, Daxingshan Temple became the site of a Buddhist college and the Association of Chinese Religious Believers, which were founded by Taixu, Yu Bin and Feng Yuxiang.

=== People's Republic of China ===
After the establishment of the Communist State in 1955, the Chinese government appropriated a large sum of money for constructing the temple. On August 6, 1956, it was listed among the first batch of provincial level cultural heritage by the Shaanxi Provincial Government.

During the Cultural Revolution the Red Guards had attacked the temple in 1966.

After the 3rd plenary session of the 11th Central Committee of the Chinese Communist Party, according to the national policy of free religious belief, the Buddhist Association of Shaanxi took over the temple and started a reconstruction project. In 1984, it has been designated as a National Key Buddhist Temple in Han Chinese Area by the State Council of China. In 1985, it became the site of Buddhist Association of Xi'an. That same year, the Japanese Shingon presented a bronze statue of Ksitigarbha to the temple.

In 2015, China's paramount leader Xi Jinping and Indian prime minister Shri Narendra Modi visited the temple.

== Architecture ==
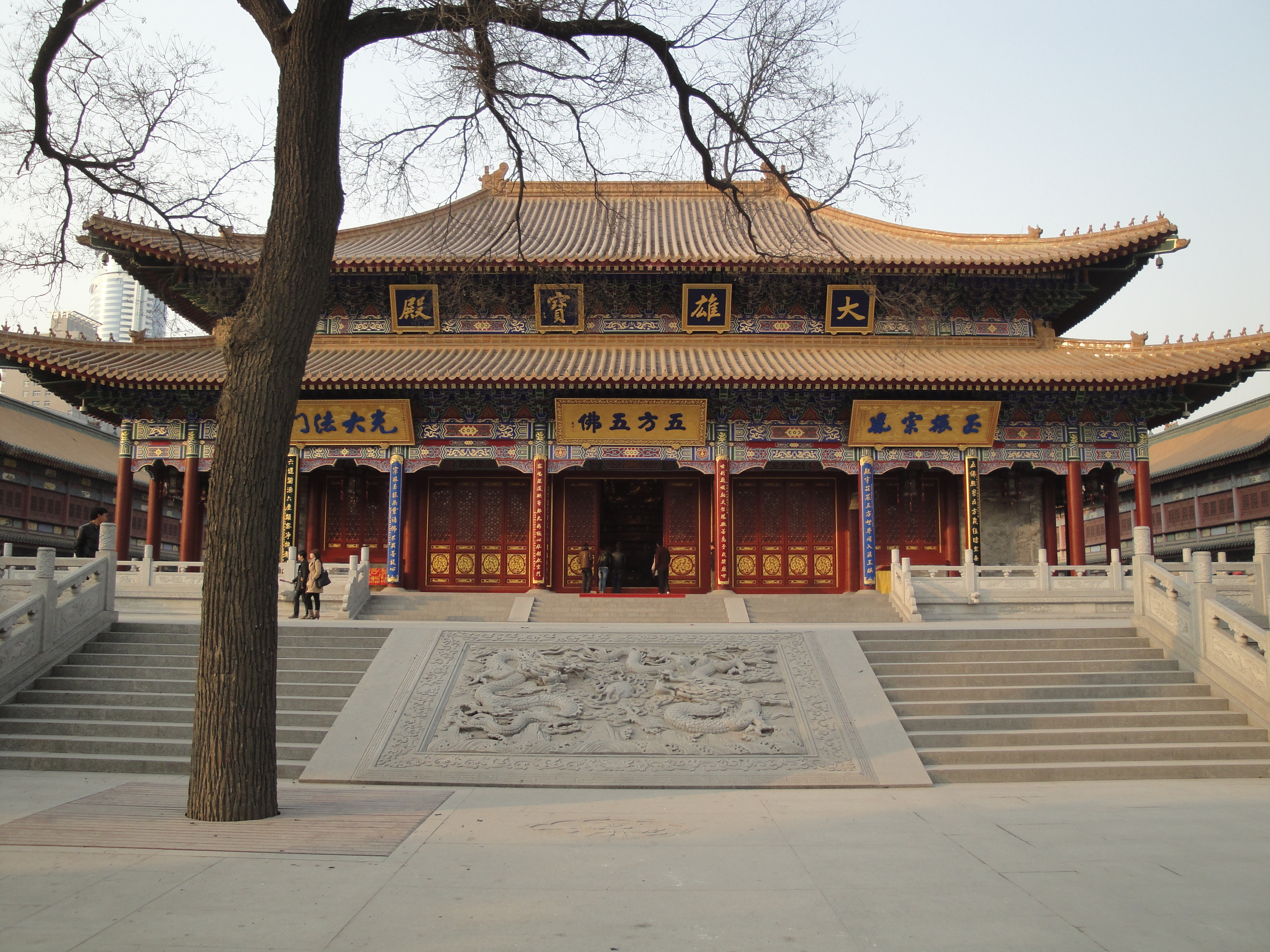
The Mahavira Hall at the temple.

Along the central axis of the temple stand six buildings including the Shanmen, Four Heavenly Kings Hall, Mahavira Hall, Guanyin Hall, Meditation Hall, and Dharma Hall. Subsidiary structures were built on both sides of the central axis including the Drum Tower, Bell Tower, Ksitigarbha Hall, and Manjusri Hall.

=== Shanmen ===
The extant Shanmen was built in the Ming dynasty with a two-story single eave gable and hip roof (单檐歇山顶). On both sides of the shanmen there are two Chinese guardian lions.

=== Four Heavenly Kings Hall ===
Maitreya is enshrined in the Hall of Four Heavenly Kings and at the back of his statue is a statue of Skanda. Four Heavenly Kings' statues are enshrined in the left and right side of the hall. The statues of Maitreya and Skanda were made in the Ming dynasty (1368–1644). Under the eaves is a plaque with the Chinese characters "Hall of Heavenly Kings" written by the former Venerable Master of the Buddhist Association of China Zhao Puchu.

=== Ping'an Ksitigarbha Hall ===
The Ping'an Ksitigarbha Hall houses the statues of Ksitigarbha and Yama. In front of the hall, a wooden plaque with Chinese characters "Ping'an Ksitigarbha Hall" (平安地藏殿) was written by former abbot Jieming (界明).

=== Mahavira Hall ===
The Mahavira Hall is the main hall in the temple. In the middle of the hall placed the statues of Five Buddha, with statues of Guanyin, Shancai and Longnü at his back. The statues of Twenty-four Gods stand on both sides of the hall.

=== Guanyin Hall ===
A Ming dynasty wood carving statue of Thousand Armed and Eyed Guanyin is placed in the hall. In the center of the eaves of the hall is a plaque, on which there are the words "Guanyin Hall" written by Chuanyin, the former Venerable Master of the Buddhist Association of China.

=== Dharma Hall ===
The Dharma Hall enshrining the statue of Vairocana. Under the eaves is a plaque with the Chinese characters "觉悟众生" written by Guangxu Emperor (1875–1908) in the Qing dynasty (1644–1911).

=== Courtyard ===
In the centre of the courtyard, there is a sheltered shrine where Marici, Mahakala, Ragaraja and Yamantaka are placed.
