= Humane King Sutra =

Sutra in Mahāyāna Buddhism

The Humane King Sutra (Chinese: 仁王經; pinyin: Rénwáng-jīng; Japanese: 仁王経; rōmaji: Ninnō-gyō; Korean: 인왕경; romaja: inwang-gyeong; Vietnamese: Kinh Hộ Quốc) is found in Taisho No. 245 and 246. Many scholars have suspected this sutra to be composed in China but this viewpoint is not universally agreed upon. (Note: Yang p.85 said : 'Firstly in Huili's Records of the Tang Dynasty Tripitaka Master of the Great Ci'en Monastery it states that Xuanzang (602-664 CE) was requested by the King of Gaochang to give a Dharma Teaching based on the Humane King Sutra thereby implying the Humane King Sutra was known outside China' Yang p. 83-85 said : 'there were altogether four translations – two of which were lost; none of the translations were suspected to be apocryphal in the traditional catalogs – only to have unknown translators' Yang p.86 said : 'the records regarding the translation by Amoghavajra clearly states he worked from a Sanskrit text') There are two versions: the first is called the Humane King Perfection of Wisdom Sutra (仁王般若波羅蜜經), while the second is called the Humane King State-Protection Perfection of Wisdom Sutra (仁王護國般若波羅蜜經), more idiomatically the Prajnaparamita Scripture for Humane Kings Who Wish to Protect their States. Both sutras are found in the prajnaparamita section of the Taisho Tripitaka.

This sutra is unusual in the fact that its target audience, rather than being either lay practitioners or the community of monks and nuns, is the rulership (i.e. monarchs, presidents, prime ministers, etc.). Thus, for example, where the interlocutors in most scriptures are arhats or bodhisattvas, the discussants in this text are the kings of the sixteen ancient regions of India. The foregrounded teachings, rather than being meditation and wisdom, are "humaneness" and "forbearance" or "ksanti", these being the most applicable religious values for the governance of a Buddhist state. Hence today in some Chinese temples, the sutra is used during prayers on behalf of the government and the country.

A second translation from a Sanskrit text was carried out a few centuries after the appearance of the original version, by the monk Amoghavajra (Bukong 不空), one of the most important figures in the Chinese Zhenyan tradition, as well as a patriarch in the Shingon school of Japan. This second version of the text (仁王護國般若波羅蜜經, T 246.8.834-845) is similar to the original version (仁王般若波羅蜜經, T 245.8.825-834), the translation of which was attributed to Kumārajīva, but it contains new sections that include teachings on mandala, mantra, and dhāraṇī.

== Themes ==
One theme of the sutra is impermanence. A passage which is popular in Japan is the four-character expression (yojijukugo) "the prosperous inevitably decline" (盛者必衰, jōshahissui), which in full reads "The prosperous inevitably decline, the full inevitably empty" (盛者必衰、実者必虚, jōsha hissui, jissha hikkyo), and is analogous to sic transit gloria mundi in the West. This is famously quoted in the first line of The Tale of the Heike, whose latter half reads: "the color of the sāla flowers reveals the truth that the prosperous must decline." (沙羅雙樹の花の色、盛者必衰の理を顯す, sharasōju no hana no iro, jōshahissui no kotowari wo arawasu).

== Translations ==
There are two classical Chinese translations extant:

- the 仁王護國般若波羅蜜經 Renwang Huguo Bore Boluomi Jing (trans. by Kumārajīva in 410-412).
- the 仁王護國般若波羅蜜多經 Renwang Huguo Bore Boluomiduo Jing (trans. by Amoghavajra in 765-766). Amogavajra translated the mantras.

The discovery of the Old Translated Inwanggyeong (구역인왕경;舊譯仁王經) in Gugyeol in the mid-1970s contributed to Middle Korean studies.

== See also ==
- Chinese Buddhism
- Japanese Imperial Rituals
