= Wenshu Temple (Chengdu) =

Buddhist temple in Chengdu, Sichuan, China

- 文殊院
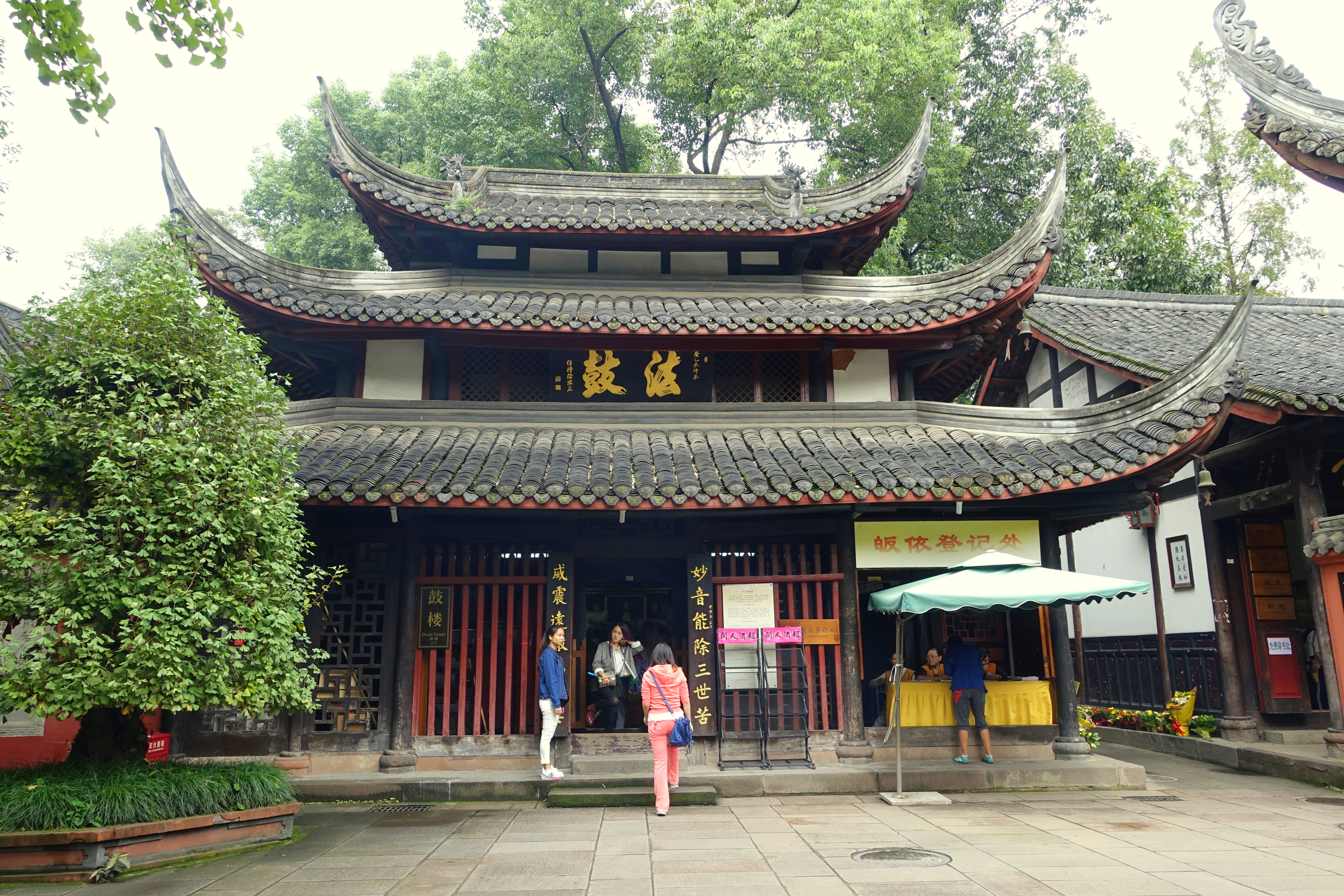
- The Drum tower at Wenshu Temple

- Location within Sichuan Location within China

Religion
- Affiliation: Buddhism
- Sect: Chan Buddhism

Location
- Location: Qingyang, Chengdu, Sichuan
- Country: China
- Coordinates: 30°40′53″N 104°04′44″E

Architecture
- Style: Chinese architecture
- Founder: Yang Xiu
- Established: Daye period (605–617)
- Completed: 1706 (reconstruction)

Website
- konglin.net

Wenshu Temple, or Wenshu Monastery (Chinese: 文殊院; pinyin: Wénshū Yuàn; lit. 'Temple of Manjushri'), is a Buddhist temple located in Qingyang, Chengdu, Sichuan, China.

== History ==
=== Sui dynasty ===
Legend has it that the original temple was built by a consort of Princess Yang Xiu, son of Emperor Wendi in the Sui dynasty (581–618).

=== Five Dynasties and Ten Kingdoms ===
The temple was renamed "Miaoyuan Tayuan" (妙圆塔院) during the Five Dynasties and Ten Kingdoms (907–960).

=== Song dynasty ===
In the Song dynasty (960–1279), its name was changed into "Xinxiang Temple" (信相寺).

=== Ming dynasty ===
According to Chengdu County Annals, a disastrous fire consumed the temple at the end of the Ming dynasty (1368–1644), only ten iron statues of Buddhist deities and two thousand-year-old China firs survived.

=== Qing dynasty ===
In 1681, in the reign of Kangxi Emperor of the Qing dynasty (1644–1911), master Cidu (慈笃) came to the site and built a thatched cottage. At that time, the temple was renamed "Wenshu Temple", which is still in use now. Renovations and rebuilding to the buildings began in 1697 and were completed in 1706.

During the Jiaqing and Daoguang periods (1796–1850), the temple was largely extended by abbot Benyuan (本圆).

=== Republic of China ===
During the Second Sino-Japan War (1937–1945), masters Foyuan, Taixu and Nenghai were successively resided in the temple, where they promulgated Buddhist doctrines.

=== People's Republic of China ===
Wenshu Temple has been authorized as a National Key Buddhist Temple in Han Chinese Area by the State Council of China in 1983.

== Architecture ==
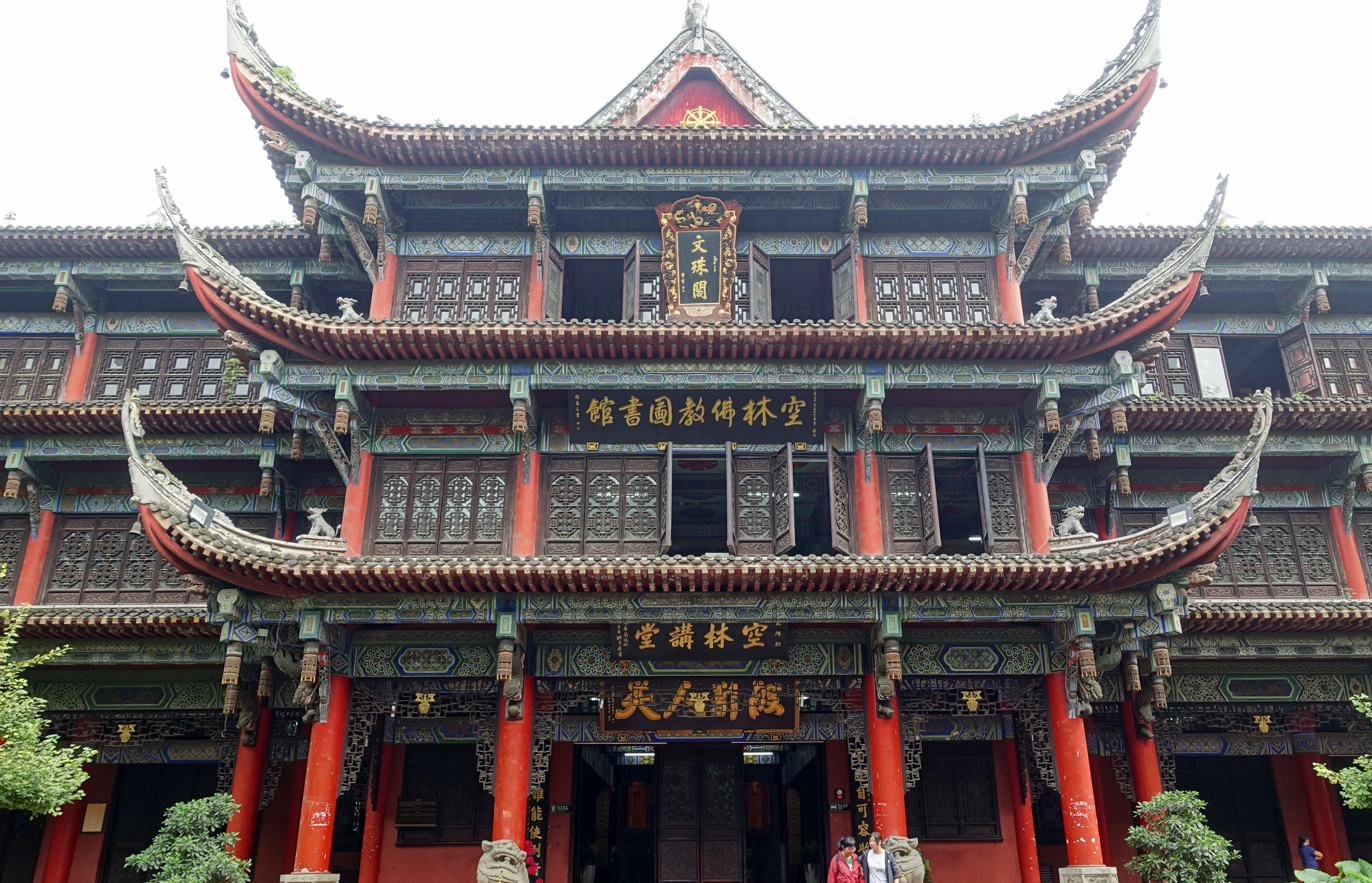
Wenshu Pavilion.

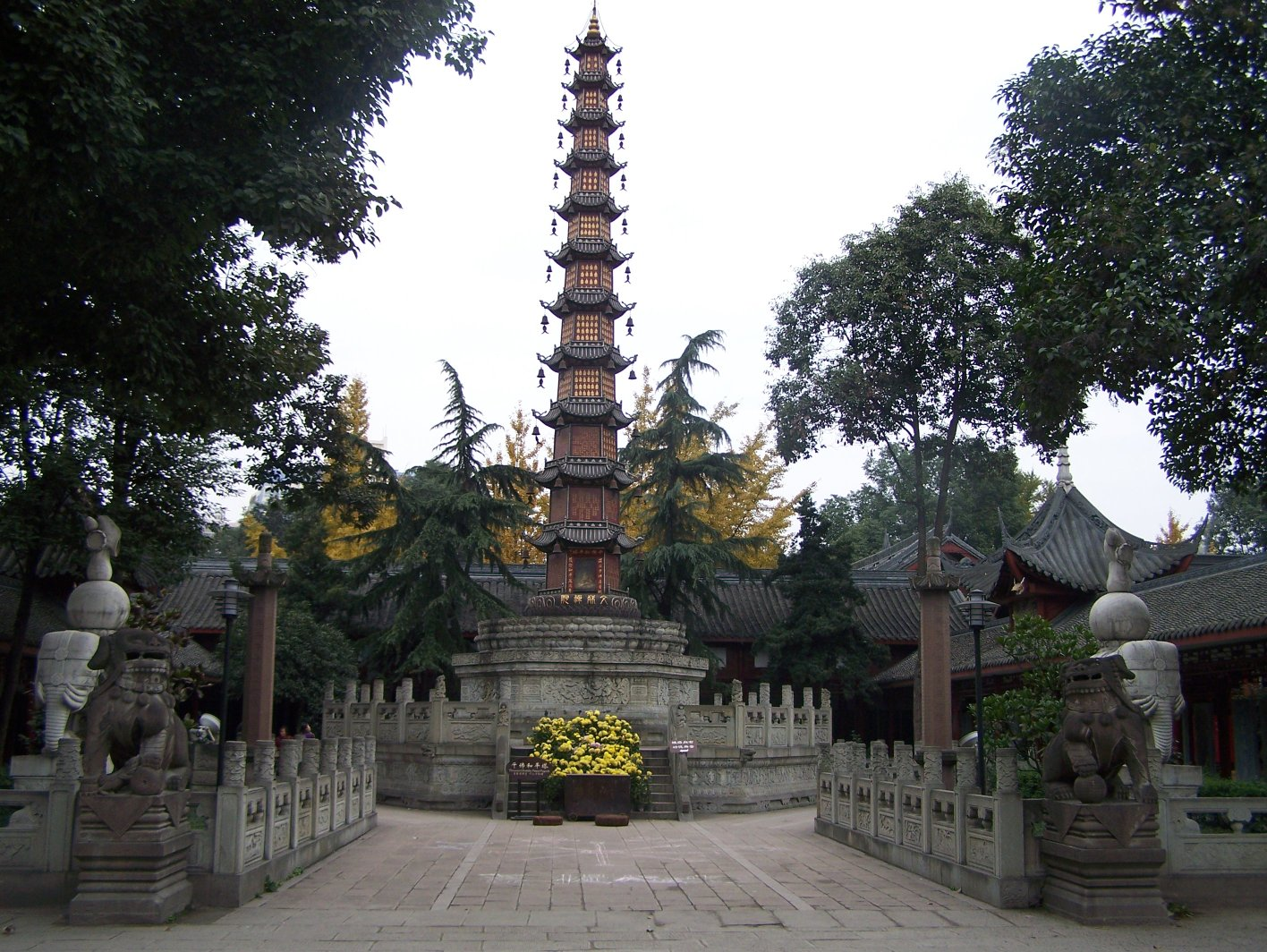
Thousand Buddha Pagoda.

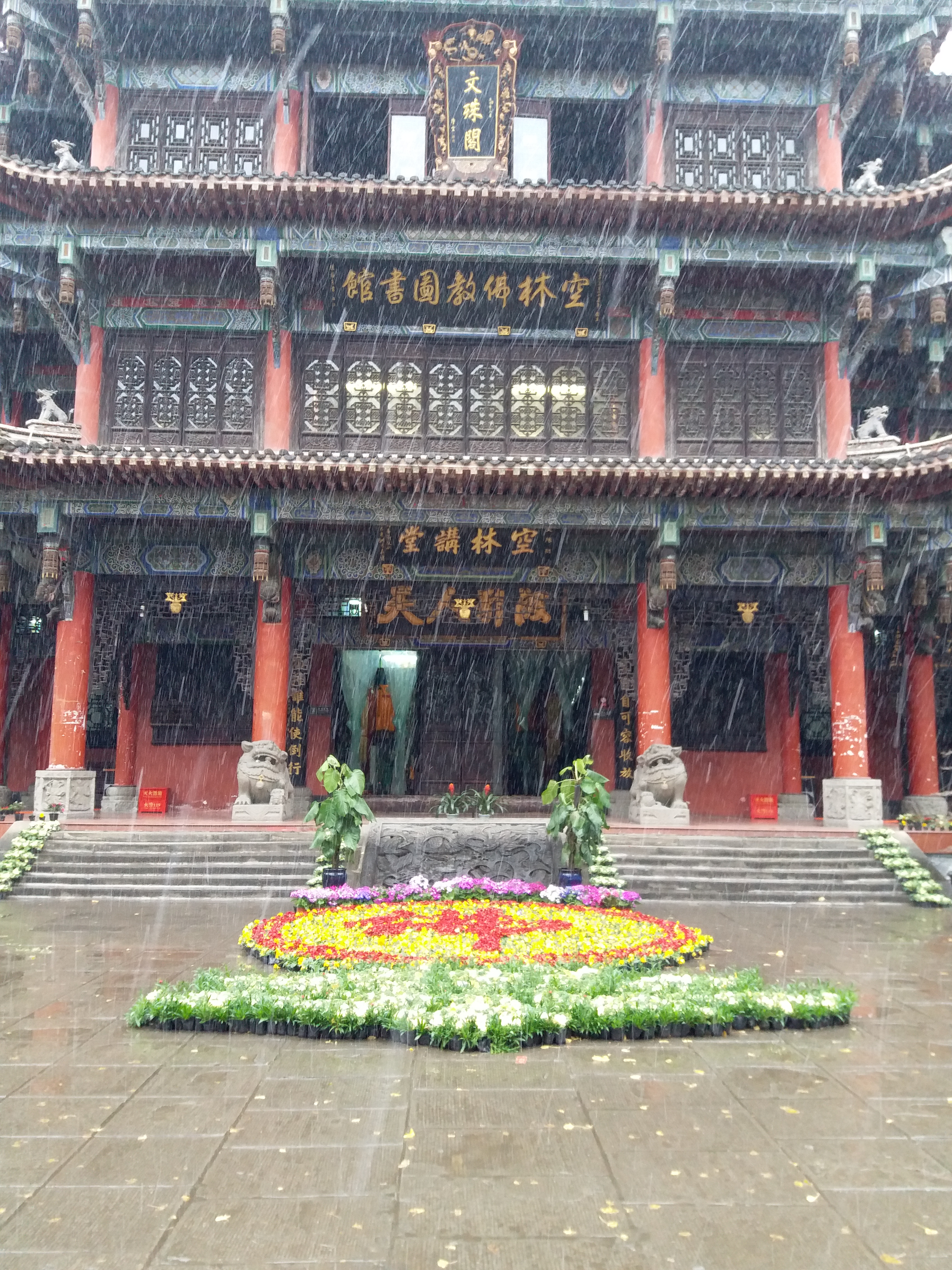
snowing at Wenshu Monastery

The entire temple faces south with the Four Heavenly Kings Hall, Hall of Three Sages of the West, Mahavira Hall, Dharma Hall and the Buddhist Texts Library along the central axis of the complex.

=== Four Heavenly Kings Hall ===
Maitreya is enshrined in the Hall of Four Heavenly Kings and at the back of his statue is a statue of Skanda. Statues of Four Heavenly Kings are placed on both sides of the hall.

=== Hall of Three Sages of the West ===
The Hall of Three Sages of the West enshrining statues of the Three Sages of the West (西方三圣), namely Guanyin, Amitabha and Mahasthamaprapta.

=== Mahavira Hall ===
The Mahavira Hall in it has single-eave gable and hip roof and is 10.56 metres (34.6 ft) high. A sitting statue of Sakyamuni is placed in the middle of the hall. Statues of Ananda and Kassapa Buddha stand on the left and right sides of Sakyamuni's statue. The statues were cast in 1829 in the Daoguang era of the Qing dynasty.

=== Dharma Hall ===
Behind the Mahavira Hall is the Dharma Hall enshrining the statue of Bhaisajyaguru. The statues of the Twelve Heavenly Generals (药叉大将) stand on both sides of the hall.

== National Treasures ==
A finger bone relic of the Sakyamuni Buddha is enshrined in the temple. Master Nenghai brought it from Bodh Gaya, India.

A parietal bone relic of Xuanzang is also preserved in the temple. It comes from Bao'en Temple in Nanjing, Jiangsu.
