= Salulap =

- Location within Borneo
- Coordinates: 1.43333°N 111.51667°E
- Country: Malaysia
- State: Sarawak
- Elevation: 90 m (300 ft)

Salulap is a settlement in Sarawak, Malaysia. It lies approximately 132.7 kilometres (82.5 mi) east of the state capital Kuching. Neighbouring settlements include:

- Semumoh 1.9 kilometres (1.2 mi) south
- Serian 1.9 kilometres (1.2 mi) west
- Empaong 2.6 kilometres (1.6 mi) southeast
- Pok 2.6 kilometres (1.6 mi) southwest
- Tanu 3.7 kilometres (2.3 mi) east
- Jangkar 3.7 kilometres (2.3 mi) east
