= Jangkar =

- Location within Borneo
- Coordinates: 1.43333°N 111.55°E
- Country: Malaysia
- State: Sarawak
- Elevation: 88 m (289 ft)

Jangkar is a settlement in Sarawak, Malaysia. It lies approximately 136.4 kilometres (84.8 mi) east of the state capital Kuching. Neighbouring settlements include:

- Tanu 0 kilometres (0.0 mi) north
- Tusor 1.9 kilometres (1.2 mi) south
- Sekuyat 1.9 kilometres (1.2 mi) east
- Empaong 2.6 kilometres (1.6 mi) southwest
- Bedanum 2.6 kilometres (1.6 mi) southeast
