= Vajrabodhi =

7/8th-century Indian Vajrayana Buddhist monk and teacher in Tang-dynasty China

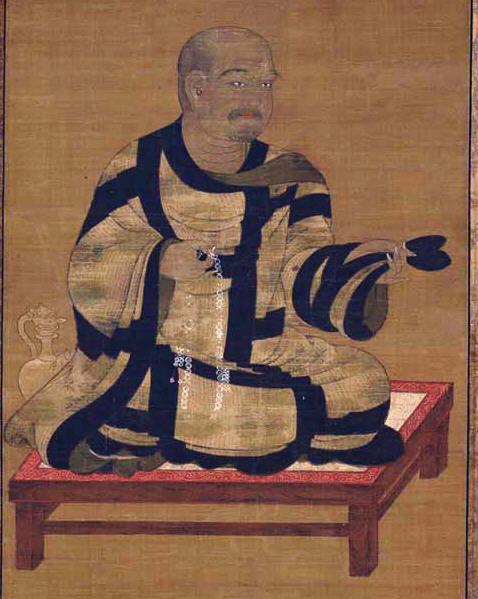
- Painting of Vajrabodhi. Japan, Kamakura period (14th century)

Personal life
- Born: c. 671 India
- Died: c. 741 CE China
- Education: Nalanda

Religious life
- Religion: Buddhism
- School: Vajrayana

Senior posting
- Teacher: Dharmakirti
- Students: Amoghavajra; Hyecho

Vajrabodhi (Sanskrit: वज्रबोधि, Chinese: 金剛智; pinyin: Jīngāngzhì, 671–741 CE) was an Indian esoteric Buddhist monk and teacher in Nalanda and later in Tang China. He is one of the eight patriarchs in Shingon Buddhism as well as Zhenyan Buddhism. He is notable for introducing Vajrayana Buddhism in the territories of the Srivijaya Empire which subsequently evolved into a distinct form known as Indonesian Esoteric Buddhism.

== Biography ==
Vajrabodhi's place of birth is considered to be uncertain with conflicting accounts. According to some accounts, Vajrabodhi was born to a family in South India. His father was said to have been a royal priest and architect in Kanchipuram. However some scholars including Sylvain Lévi claim that he was born in Central India and was the third son of a King by the name of Īśānavarman who has been linked with the Maukhari dynasty. Lu Xiang, an 8th century contemporary of Vajrabodhi who worked in the Tang dynasty court, composed a biography of Vajrabodhi after his death and also states he was born in Central India. He goes on to clarify that Vajrabodhi was mistakenly referred to as a South Indian because he was recommended to the Tang Emperor by the General of a South Indian King. Vajrabodhi probably converted to Buddhism at the age of sixteen, although some accounts place him at the Buddhist institution of Nālandā in Magadha at the age of ten.

As is common with many Buddhist masters, his biographers portray him as an intelligent child who studied many texts including those belonging to Jainism. He also studied for a time under the Buddhist logician, Dharmakīrti while at Nalanda. Under Santijnana, Vajrabodhi studied Vajrayāna teachings and was duly initiated into yoga.

Seeking further knowledge he travelled to Sri Lanka and Sriwijaya (present-day Palembang in the south of Sumatra Island, Indonesia), where he apparently was taught a Vajrayāna tradition distinct from that taught at Nālandā. This Tamraparniyan route had been traversed by several scholars prior, and mirrored the reach of Agastya. From Srivijaya he sailed to China via the escort of thirty-five Persian merchant-vessels, and by AD 720 was ensconced in the Jianfu Temple at the Chinese capital, Chang'an (present-day Xi'an). Accompanying him was his soon-to-be-famous disciple, Amoghavajra.

Like Subhakarasimha, who preceded him by four years, Vajrabodhi spent most of his time in ritual activity, in translating texts from Sanskrit to Chinese, and in the production of Esoteric art. Particularly important was his partial translation of the Sarvatathāgatatattvasagraha between the years 723 and 724. This Yoga Tantra - along with the Mahāvairocana Sutra, translated by Subhakarasimha the same year - provides the foundation of the Zhenyan school in China and the Shingon and Esoteric branch of the Tendai school in Japan. Like Subhakarasimha, Vajrabodhi had ties to high court circles and enjoyed the patronage of imperial princesses; he also taught Korean monk Hyecho; who went on to travel India and Umayyad Persia. Vajrabodhi died in 741 and was buried south of the Longmen Grottoes. He was posthumously awarded the title Guoshi ("Teacher of the Realm").

== Teachings ==
Vajrabodhi is considered among the first major teachers of the Tattvasaṃgraha Tantra in China when he arrived in 723, particularly focusing on the "yoga" portions of the text. His own rendition details provides an outline for the key elements of yoga including the mudras, mantras and the qualifications that each disciple requires for entry into the mandala techniques. He also provided guidance on techniques for making offerings, erecting altars and bestowing abhiṣeka.

Vajrabodhi passed on to his disciple, Amoghavajra, that the Tattvasaṃgraha Tantra originated from the cosmic Buddha, Vairocana who initiated Vajrapani, the bodhisattva. These teachings were said to have been passed to a "great worthy who gained access to an iron stupa" (some have identified this as Nagarjuna) and who then, after hundreds of years transmitted them to Nāgabodhi; after a further “several hundred years,” Nāgabodhi had passed them to Vajrabodhi himself.

Other than Amoghavajra and Yi Xing, Vajrabodhi also had other students including Yifu (638-736) and a Huichao who came from Silla. Many, academics including Frederick M. Smith and Michael Strickmann argued that Vajrabodhi introduced methods that would inform Chinese exorcism practices throughout the period of the Tang dynasty, the Five dynasties and the Song.

== Bibliography ==
- Sundberg, Jeffrey; Giebel, Rolf (Fall 2011). "The Life of the Tang Court Monk Vajrabodhi as Chronicled by Lü Xiang (呂向): South Indian and Śrī Laṅkān Antecedents to the Arrival of the Buddhist Vajrayāna in Eighth-Century Java and China", Pacific World: Journal of the Institute of Buddhist (3rd Series) 13, 129–222
