= Penurin =

Settlement and longhouse in Sarawak, Malaysia

- Location within Borneo
- Coordinates: 1.4°N 111.55°E
- Country: Malaysia
- State: Sarawak
- Elevation: 100 m (330 ft)

Penurin is a settlement and longhouse in Sarawak, Malaysia. It lies approximately 136.9 kilometres (85.1 mi) east of the state capital Kuching. Neighbouring settlements include:

- Maja 1.9 kilometres (1.2 mi) east
- Saka 1.9 kilometres (1.2 mi) south
- Tusor 1.9 kilometres (1.2 mi) north
- Empaong 2.6 kilometres (1.6 mi) northwest
- Bedanum 2.6 kilometres (1.6 mi) northeast
- Tansang 2.6 kilometres (1.6 mi) southwest
- Melaban 3.7 kilometres (2.3 mi) west
