= Kundong =

- Location within Borneo
- Coordinates: 1.41667°N 111.58333°E
- Country: Malaysia
- State: Sarawak
- Elevation: 106 m (348 ft)

Kundong is a settlement in Sarawak, Malaysia. It lies approximately 140.3 kilometres (87.2 mi) east of the state capital Kuching. Neighbouring settlements include:

- Bedanum 1.9 kilometres (1.2 mi) west
- Sekuyat 2.6 kilometres (1.6 mi) northwest
- Maja 2.6 kilometres (1.6 mi) southwest
- Tusor 3.7 kilometres (2.3 mi) west
