= Amoghavajra =

8th century Buddhist monk

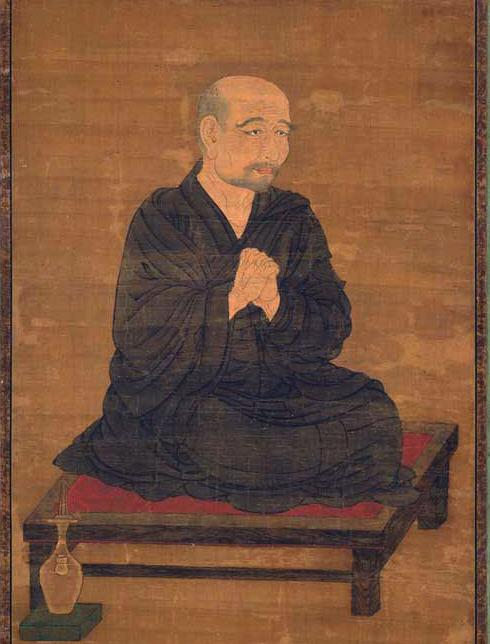
- Portrait of Amoghavajra from the Kamakura Period, Japan (c. 14th century)

Personal life
- Born: 705 Western Regions or Sri Lanka
- Died: 774 (aged 68–69)

Religious life
- Religion: Esoteric Buddhism
- School: Zhenyan Buddhism; Shingon Buddhism

Senior posting
- Teacher: Vajrabodhi
- Students: Dazu Huike

Amoghavajra (Sanskrit: अमोघवज्र, romanized: Amoghavajra; Chinese: 不空; pinyin: Bùkōng; Japanese: Fukū; Korean: 불공; Vietnamese: Bất Không; 705–774), also known in Chinese as Pu-k’ung Chin-kang and in Japanese as Fukū Kongō, was an influential teacher of Esoteric Buddhism in 8th-century China, a prolific translator, and one of the most politically powerful Buddhist monks in Chinese history. He is recognized as a patriarch of Zhenyan Buddhism and Shingon Buddhism, and specifically as the sixth patriarch of the Chinese Chen-yen tradition.

Amoghavajra's early life is uncertain, but at about the age of ten he went to Java, and subsequently studied under Vajrabodhi. Together they travelled to China in 720, where they established esoteric Buddhism. From about 740, Amoghavajra spent approximately five years in India, collecting Sanskrit texts. After returning to China, he undertook an extensive programme of translation, ultimately producing more than 100 translated works. His own teaching was based especially on the Vajraśekhara Sūtra, characterized as a wisdom text, and he received imperial support for the construction of temples as well as for his teaching and performance of esoteric rituals. In 765 he was given the title Kuang-chih San-tsang (Japanese: Kōchi Sanzō).

Among his pupils was Hui-k'o, who transmitted the teaching to Kūkai and thereby to Japan.

== Life ==
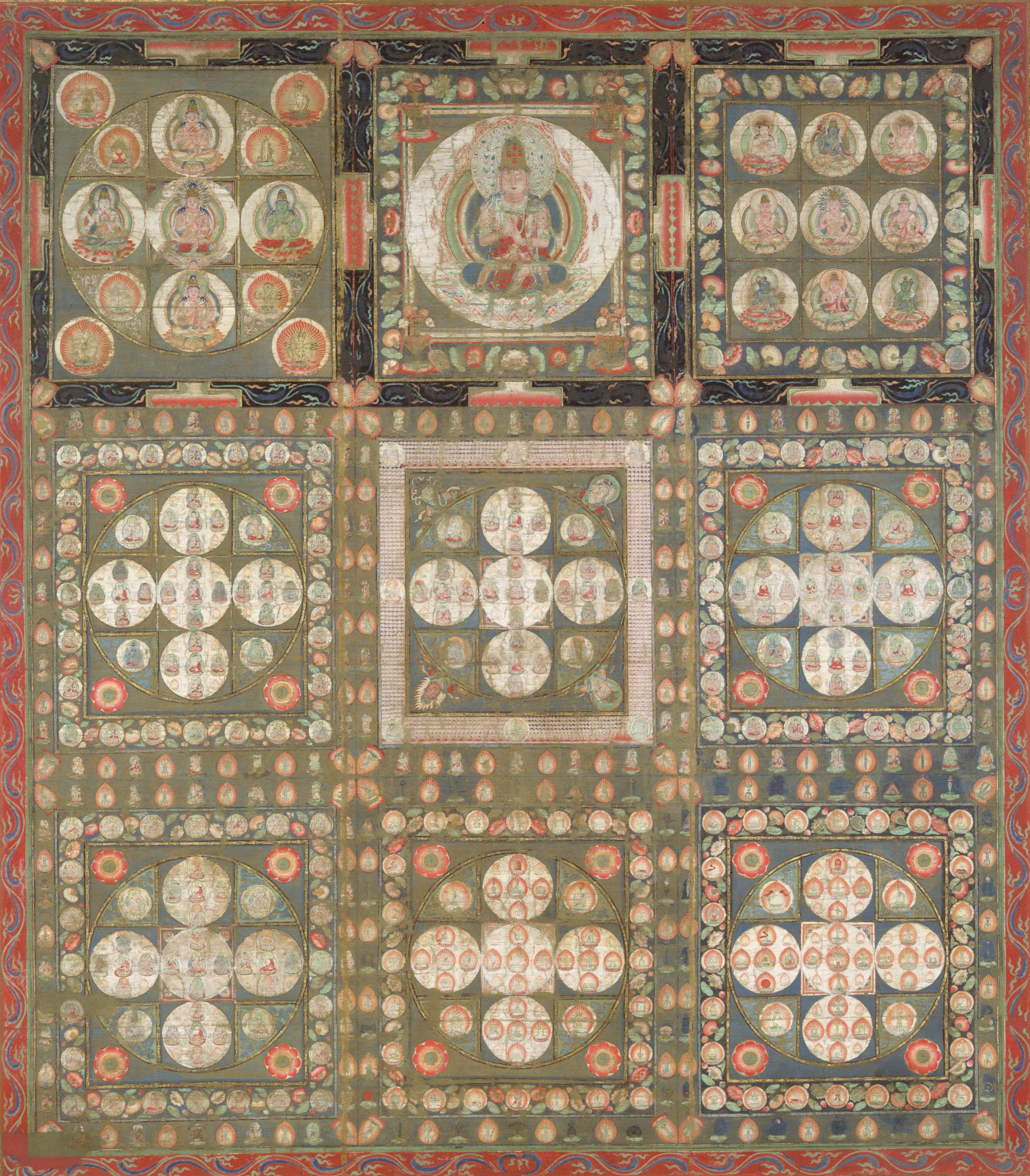
The Vajradhātu maṇḍala used in Amoghavajra's teachings from the Tattvasaṃgraha.

There are differing views as to where Amoghavajra's origins were from. Zhao Qian states that Amoghavajra was born in Samarkand of an Indian merchant or Brahmin father as according to Feixis's Stele Inscription and a mother of Sogdian origin. Yan Ying referred to Amoghavajra simply as being "a person of the Western Regions". Alternatively, Quan Deyu's image hall stele inscription states that Amoghavajra was from Sri Lanka. Yuanzhao also repeats the claim that Amoghavajra was from Sri Lanka.

Amoghavajra went to China at age ten after his father's death. In 719, he was ordained into the sangha by Vajrabodhi and became his disciple. After all foreign monks were expelled from China in 741, he and some associates went on a pilgrimage to gather texts, visiting Sri Lanka, Indochina and India. During this voyage, he apparently met Nagabodhi, Vajrabodhi's master, and studied the Tattvasaṃgraha Tantra at length. He returned to China in 746 with some five hundred volumes gathered from Sri Lanka.

In 750, he left the court to join the military governorship of General Geshu Han of the Tang dynasty, for whom he conducted large-scale tantric initiations at his field headquarters. In 754, he translated the first portion of the Tattvasaṃgraha Tantra texts (Taishō Tripiṭaka. 865), central to the Outer Tantras of Vajrayana Buddhism, which became one of his most significant accomplishments. He regarded its teachings as the most effective method for attaining enlightenment yet devised, and incorporated its basic schema in several writings.

Amoghavajra was captured during the An Lushan Rebellion but in 757 was freed by loyalist forces, whereupon he performed rites to purify the capital and consolidate the security of the Tang state. Two years later, he initiated the emperor Emperor Suzong of Tang as a chakravartin.

Amoghavajra assisted the Tang dynasty state against the An Lushan rebellion. He carried out Vajrayana rituals which were ostensibly effective in supernaturally attacking and destroying An Lushan's army including the death of one of An Lushan's generals, Zhou Zhiguang.

In 765, Amoghavajra used his new rendition of the Humane King Sutra in an elaborate ritual to counter the advance of a 200,000-strong army of Tibetan and Uyghurs which was poised to invade Chang'an. Its leader, Pugu Huai'en, dropped dead in camp and his forces dispersed.

The opulent Jinge Temple on Mount Wutai was completed in 767, a pet project of Amoghavajra, one of his many efforts to promote the Bodhisattva Mañjuśrī as the protector of China. Amoghavajra continued to perform rites to avert disaster at the request of Emperor Daizong of Tang.

On his death in 774, three days of mourning were officially declared, and he posthumously received various exalted titles. The Chinese monks Huilang, Huiguo and Huilin were among his most prominent successors. Seventy-seven texts were translated by Amoghavajra according to his own account, though many more, including original compositions, are ascribed to him in the Chinese canons.
