= Melaban =

- Location within Borneo
- Coordinates: 1.4°N 111.51667°E
- Country: Malaysia
- State: Sarawak
- Elevation: 89 m (292 ft)

Melaban is a settlement in Sarawak, Malaysia. It lies approximately 133.2 kilometres (82.8 mi) east of the state capital Kuching. Neighbouring settlements include:

- Betong 0 kilometres (0.0 mi) north
- Ban 1.9 kilometres (1.2 mi) west
- Semumoh 1.9 kilometres (1.2 mi) north
- Empaong 2.6 kilometres (1.6 mi) northeast
- Pok 2.6 kilometres (1.6 mi) northwest
- Salulap 3.7 kilometres (2.3 mi) north
