= Monica Esposito =

Italian Chinese religious scholar

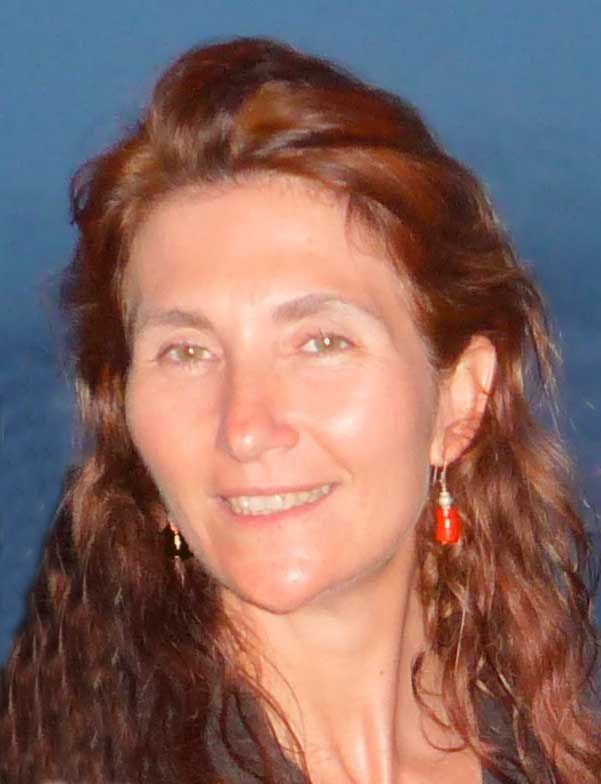
Dr Monica Esposito, August 7, 1962 (Genova) - March 10, 2011 (Kyoto)

Monica Esposito (August 7, 1962 – March 10, 2011) was an Italian scholar of Chinese religion specializing in the history, texts and practices of Daoism from the 15th to 20th centuries).

== Early life and education ==
Esposito was born in 1962 in the Italian city of Genoa. At the age of 4, she moved with her family (father Carlo Esposito, mother Iris Barzaghi and sister Adriana Esposito) to Padua. After graduating from high School (classics, with Greek and Latin) she studied Chinese language and philosophy at the University of Venice (Ca'Foscari), Fudan University in Shanghai and the Ghent University in Belgium. After graduation with a thesis on Qigong in 1987, she continued her studies under the direction of Professor Isabelle Robinet at the Department of Far Eastern Studies of the University of Paris. After obtaining the Diploma of Advanced Studies (D.E.A.) on texts of the Daoist canon in 1988, she returned to Shanghai and studied at the Academy of Social Science of Shanghai under the direction of Professor Chen Yaoting. Her graduate studies ended in 1993 with a summa cum laude Ph.D. in Far Eastern studies with the thesis "The Dragon Gate - The Longmen school of Mount Jin'gai and its alchemical practices according to the Daozang xubian (complement to the Daoist canon)".

During several stays in China and Tibet, Esposito conducted extensive field work on Qigong, Taiji, Daoist and Buddhist (particularly Dzogchen) practices in China.

== Career ==
After post-doctoral studies at the Department of Indological and Far-Eastern Studies of the University of Venice (1994–1995), at the Sorbonne in Paris (1995–1997) and at Kansai University in Osaka, she established permanent residence in Kyoto in 1998 and married Urs App. Between 1998 and 2003, she concentrated on field studies in Taiwan, Hong Kong and continental China leading to the production, together with her husband, of several highly acclaimed video productions about Far Eastern religions.

After being elected an associate professor at Kyoto University's Institute for Research in Humanistic Studies (Jinbun Kagaku kenkyūsho) in 2003, Esposito continued her research on Daoist texts of the Ming and Qing periods. She conceived and directed the Daozang Jiyao research project, an international research project with over 60 scientific collaborators on the most important Daoist text collection of the Qing period. For portions of this large project, which began in 2006, Esposito obtained important grants from the Chiang Ching-kuo foundation (2006–2009 and 2010-2013) and from the Japanese Society for the Promotion of Science (JSPS; 2008-2011). The main institutions collaborating in this ongoing project are:

- Kyoto University, Institute of Research in Humanities (Jinbun Kagaku Kenkyūsho)
- Academia Sinica: Institute of Chinese Literature and Philosophy; Institute of Philology and History
- The Chinese University of Hong Kong, Department: Culture and Religious Studies, Center for Studies of Daoist Culture
- École française d'Extrême-Orient
- Sichuan Academy of Social Science, Department of Philosophy
- Sichuan University, Institute of Religious Studies

The focuses of Esposito's research were Ming and Qing Daoism, inner alchemy (neidan), the interaction between Daoism and Tantrism, Buddhism of the late imperial period and Tibetan Buddhism (rDzogs chen). She died of a pulmonary embolism on March 10, 2011, in Kyoto, Japan.

== Professional memberships and functions ==
- Director, Daozang Jiyao Project
- Member, Society for the Study of Chinese Religions
- Member, Dōkyō gakkai (Japanese Society for the Study of Daoism)
- Member, American Association of Asian Studies
- Co-Editor, Routledge Studies in Taoism (Routledge, London)
- Advisory Board Member for Daoism: Religion, History and Society (Journal Publication of the Chinese University of Hong Kong, Centre for the Studies of Daoist Culture)

== Works ==
=== Monographs ===
- 1993 "La Porte du Dragon. L' école Longmen du Mont Jingai et ses pratiques alchimiques d' après le Daozang xubian (Suite au Canon Taoïste)", Ph.D. thesis, Paris VII, 1993 (under the direction of Isabelle Robinet)
- 1995 Il Qigong, la nuova scuola taoista delle cinque respirazioni [Qigong, the New Daoist School of the Five Breathings]. Padua: Muzzio, 1995.
- 1997 L'alchimia del soffio [The Alchemy of Breath]. Roma: Ubaldini, 1997.
- 2013 The Zen of Tantra. Wil (Switzerland) / Paris: UniversityMedia, 2013 (ISBN 978-3-906000-25-1). 179 pp.
- 2013 Creative Daoism. Wil (Switzerland) / Paris: UniversityMedia, 2013 (ISBN 978-3-906000-04-6). 392 pp.
- 2014 Facets of Qing Daoism. Wil (Switzerland): UniversityMedia, 2014 (ISBN 978-3-906000-06-0). 410 pp.

=== Edited volumes ===
- 2004 Special Issue: In Memoriam of Isabelle Robinet (co-edited with Hubert Durt), Cahiers d' Extrême-Asie No. 14 (2004).
- 2008 Images of Tibet in the 19th and 20th Centuries, Etudes thématiques 22 (2 volumes). Paris: École française d' Extrême-Orient, 2008.

=== Selected articles ===
- 1988 Shen Hongxun, "Taiji wuxigong–La pratica delle cinque respirazioni del Polo Supremo" [Shen Hongxun, Taiji wuxigong–The practice of the Five Breathings], Taiji wuxigong yanjiuhui, Shanghai, 1986, Biologica (Review of the Dept. of Philosophy, University Ca'Foscari, Venice)1/1988, 225–226.
- 1992 "Il Daozang xubian, raccolta di testi alchemici della Longmen" [The Daozang xubian, a collection of alchemical texts of the Longmen school], Annali dell'Instituto Universitario Orientale LII, 4, 1992, 429–449.
- 1993 "Journey to the Temple of the Celestial-Eye", in David W. Reed (ed.), Spirit of Enterprise, The 1993 Rolex Awards, 275–277. Bern: Buri ed., 1993.
- 1995 "Il Ritorno alle fonti– per la costituzione di un dizionario di alchimia interiore all'epoca Ming e Qing" [Returning to the sources– for building up a dictionary of Ming-Qing inner alchemy], in M. Scarpari (ed.), Le fonti per lo studio della civiltà cinese [The sources for the study of Chinese civilization], 101–117. Venezia: Cafoscarina, 1995.
- 1996 "Il Segreto del Fiore d'Oro e la tradizione Longmen del Monte Jin'gai [The Secret of the Golden Flower and the Longmen tradition of Mt. Jin'gai]", in P. Corradini (ed.), Conoscenza e interpretazione della civiltà cinese [Knowledge and interpretation of Chinese civilization], 151–169. Venezia: Cafoscarina, 1996.
- 1998 (in collaboration with Chen Yaoting 陳耀庭), Yidali daojiao de yanjiu 意大利道教的研究 [Italian Studies on Daoism], "Dangdai zongjiao yanjiu" 當代宗教研究 1, 44–48.
- 1998 "The different versions of the Secret of the Golden Flower and their relationship with the Longmen school", Transactions of the International Conference of Eastern Studies XLIII, 90–109.
- 1998 Chief editor of entries concerning Chinese Religion (Daoism) and Inner Alchemy for the Dictionnaire encyclopédique de l'ésotérisme, edited by Jean Servier. Paris: Presses Universitaires de France ("Absorption des effluves cosmiques", 5–6; "Alchimie feminine", 51–52; "Alchimie intérieure", with Isabelle Robinet, 55–58; "Art de l'alcôve", 58–60; "Corps subtil", 343–345; "Daoyin", 365–367; "Délivrance du cadavre", 377–378; "Exorcisme", 500–502; "Géographie sacrée", 532–534; "Immortalité et Taoïsme", 642–645; "Souffle et respiration embryonnaire", 1216–1218; "Tao", 1262–1263).
- 1998 "Italia no kangaku to dōkyō kenkyū" イタリアの漢学と道教研究, in Nakamura Shōhachi 中村璋八(ed.), Chūgokujin to dōkyō 中国人と道教, 83–104. Tokyo: Kyūko shoin 汲古書院.
- 1998 "Una tradizione di rDzogs-chen in Cina. Una nota sul Monastero delle Montagne dell'Occhio Celeste" [A tradition of rDzogs chen in China: a note on the Monastery of Celestial-Eye Mountains], Asiatica Venetiana 3, (1998): 221–224.
- 1999 "Orakel in China" [Oracles in China], in A. Langer and A. Lutz (eds), Orakel – Der Blick in die Zukunft [Oracles-A view into the future], 304–314. Zürich: Museum Rietberg.
- 2000 "Daoism in the Qing (1644–1911)", in L. Kohn (ed.), Daoism Handbook, 623–658. Leiden: Brill.
- 2001 "Longmen Taoism in Qing China–Doctrinal Ideal and Local Reality", Journal of Chinese Religions 29 (Special Number on Quanzhen edited by Vincent Goossaert and Paul Katz), 191–231.
- 2001 "In Memoriam Isabelle Robinet (1932–2000) – A Thematic and Annotated Bibliography", Monumenta Serica XLIX, 595–624.
- 2001 Numerous entries on Daoism and inner alchemy in Le grand dictionnaire Ricci de la langue chinoise (Chinese-French, in six volumes). Paris: Desclée de Brouwer.
- 2004 "The Longmen School and its Controversial History during the Qing Dynasty", in John Lagerwey ed. Religion and Chinese Society: The Transformation of a Field, vol. 2, 621–698. Paris: EFEO & Chinese University of Hong Kong, 2 vols
- 2004 "In Memoriam of Isabelle Robinet – An Annotated and Thematic Bibliography (revised and enlarged edition)", Cahiers d'Extrême-Asie 14 (Special Number in Memoriam Isabelle Robinet, edited by Monica Esposito and Hubert Durt), 1–42.
- 2004 "Sun-worship in China–The Roots of Shangqing Taoist Practices of Light", Cahiers d'Extrême-Asie 14 (Special Number in Memoriam Isabelle Robinet, edited by Monica Esposito and Hubert Durt), 345–402
- 2004 "Gyakuten shita zō-jotan no shintai kan" 逆転した像–女丹の身体觀 (The inverted mirror: the vision of body in feminine inner alchemy), in Sakade Yoshinobu sensei taikyū kinen ronshū kankō kai 坂祥伸先生退休記念論集刊行会 (ed.), Chūgoku shisō ni okeru shintai, shizen, shinkō 中国思想における身体．自然．信仰 [Body, nature, and religious beliefs in Chinese thought] (A volume dedicated to Professor Yoshinobu Sakade), 113–129. Tokyo: Tōhō shoten 東方書店.
- 2004 "Shindai ni okeru Kingai-zan no seiritsu to Kinka shūshi" 清代における金蓋山龍門派の成立と『金華宗旨』[The Secret of the Golden Flower and the Establishment of the Longmen Tradition at Mt. Jin'gai during the Qing Dynasty], in Takata Tokio 高田時雄 (ed.), Chūgoku shūkyō bunken kenkyū kokusai shinpojiumu hōkukusho 中国宗教文献研究国際シンポジウム報告書, 259–268. Kyoto: Jinbun Kagaku Kenkyūjo 人文科学研究所 (see also below for the annotated version of 2007)
- 2005 "Shindai dōkyō to mikkyō: Ryūmon seijiku shinshū" 清代道教と密教：龍門西竺心宗 [An example of Daoist and Tantric interaction during the Qing Dynasty: The Longmen Xizhu xinzong Tantric lineage], in Mugitani Kunio 麦谷邦夫 (ed.), Sankyō kōshō ronsō 三教交渉論叢 [Studies on the Interaction between the Three Teachings], 287–338. Kyoto: Jinbun Kagaku Kenkyūjo 人文科学研究所.
- 2006 "Daozang jiyao ji qi bianzuan de lishi" 道藏輯要及其編纂的歷史. (The History of the Compilation of the Daozang jiyao). Paper presented at the First International Academic Symposium of Daoist Literature and its Path to Immortality, Kaohsiung, Zhongshan University, November 10–12
- 2007 "Shindai ni okeru Kingai-zan no seiritsu to Kinka shūshi" 清代における金蓋山龍門派の成立と『金華宗旨』 (The Secret of the Golden Flower and the Establishment of the Longmen Tradition at Mt. Jin'gai during the Qing Dynasty), in Kyōto Daigaku Jinbun Kagaku Kenkyūjo 京都大学人文科学研究所 (ed.), Chūgoku shūkyō bunken kenkyū 中国宗教文献研究 [Religions in Chinese Script: Perspectives for Textual Research], 239–264. Kyoto: Rinsen shoten 臨川書店, 2007.[
- 2007 "The Discovery of Jiang Yuanting's Daozang jiyao in Jiangnan — A Presentation of the Daoist Canon of the Qing Dynasty", in Mugitani Kunio 麦谷邦夫 (ed.), Kōnan dōkyō no kenkyū 江南道教の研究 [Research on Jiangnan Daoism] (Written Reports on 2003-2006 Research Project supported by Japan Foundation for the Promotion of Science [JSPS]). Also published in Xueshu Zhongguo 學術中國 [Academic China](2007.11): 25–48.
- 2008 21 entries for The Encyclopedia of Taoism edited by Fabrizio Pregadio. London: Routledge.
- 2008 "rDzogs chen in China: from Chan to Tibetan Tantrism in Fahai Lama's (1921–1991) footsteps", in Monica Esposito (ed.), Images of Tibet in the 19th and 20th centuries, 22 (vol. 2), 473–548. Paris: École française d'Extrême-Orient.
- 2009 "Yibu Quanzhen Daozang de faming: Daozang jiyao ji Qingdai Quanzhen rentong" 一部全真道臧的发明：道臧辑要及清代全真认同., in Zhao Weidong 赵卫东 ed., Wendao Kunyushan 问道昆嵛山, 303–343. Jinan: Qilu.
- 2009 "The Daozang Jiyao Project: Mutation of a Canon", Daoism: Religion, History and Society (2009.1): 95–153.
- 2009 "The Daozang Jiyao and the Future of Daoist Studies". Paper presented at the International Conference New Approaches to the Study of Daoism in Chinese Culture and Society, Chinese University of Hong Kong, 26–28 November 2009 (forthcoming in Lai, Chi Tim & Cheung, Neky Tak-ching, New Approaches to the Study of Daoism in Chinese Culture and Society, Hong Kong: Chinese University Press, 2011).
- 2010 "Qingdai Quanzhen jiao zhi chonggou: Min Yide ji qi jianli Longmen zhengtong de yiyuan" 清代全真教之重構：閔一得及其建立龍門正統得意願 (Reinventing Quanzhen during the Qing: Min Yide and his will to orthodoxy). Paper presented at the International Quanzhen conference 探古監今 –全真道的昨天,今天與明天, Hong Kong, January 6–8, 2010 (in press).
- 2010 "Qingdai daojiao - Jiangnan Jiang Yuanting ben Daozang jiyao" 清代道藏—江南蒋元庭本《道藏辑要》之研究 (Daoism - A Study of Jiang Yuanting's Jiangnan text of the Daozang Jiyao). Zongjiao yanjiu 宗教学研究
- 2014 "The Invention of a Quanzhen Canon: The Wondrous Fate of the Daozang jiyao", Vincent Goossaert & Liu Xun (eds.) Quanzhen Daoism in Modern Society and Culture, Berkeley: Institute of East Asian Studies, 44-77.

=== Documentary films ===
- Der Teebesen. Documentary film for the Japanese Bamboo objects exhibition in the Ethnographic Museum of the University of Zurich, Switzerland (2003) and at the Ethnological Museum Munich (Völkerkundemuseum München, 2006) (in collaboration with Urs App)
- On the Way to Tōhaku's Pine Forest. Documentary film for the Hasegawa Tōhaku art exhibition (2002) at the Museum Rietberg Zürich (in collaboration with Urs App)
- Dangki. Documentary film shown in 2001 on France 2 (in collaboration with Urs App).
- Oracles in China. Documentary shown at the Oracle exhibition 2000 at the Rietberg Museum, Zürich (in collaboration with Urs App).
- Oracles in Japan. Documentary shown at the Oracle exhibition 2000 at the Rietberg Museum, Zürich (in collaboration with Urs App).
- Dangki: Chinese Oracle Kids. Documentary shown at the Oracle exhibition 2000 at the Rietberg Museum, Zürich (in collaboration with Urs App).
