= Huilin =

Chinese translator and Sanskrit scholar

Hui Lin 慧琳 (737 – 820 CE) was a Chinese translator and Sanskrit scholar.

Born in Kashgar, he was author of the Yíqièjīngyīnyì《一切經音義》, written between 783 and 807 CE, the earliest Chinese lexicographical work to distinguish the labiodentals from the bilabial initials.
