= Shi Nenghai =

Chinese Vajrayana Buddhist monk and religious leader

- 释能海
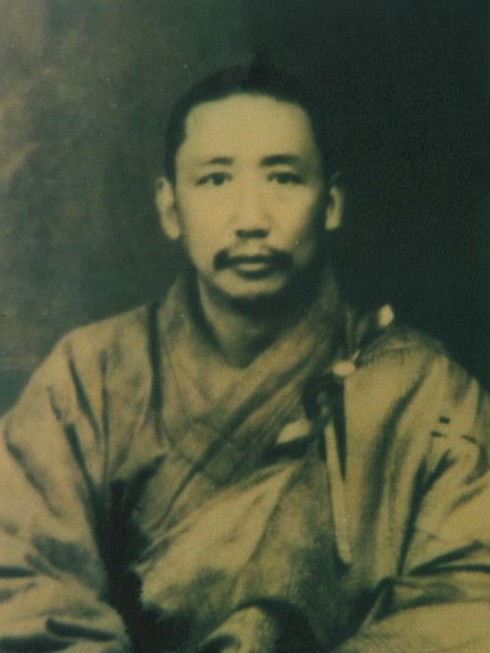
- Photograph of Nenghai

Personal life
- Born: Gong Xueguang (龚学光); 20 January 1886 Hanwang Town, Mianzhu, Sichuan, Qing China
- Died: 1 January 1967 (aged 80) Shancaidong Temple, Wutai Mountain, Shanxi, China
- Parent: Gong Changyi (father)
- Other name: Nenghai Master (能海上师)

Religious life
- Religion: Chan Buddhism; Tibetan Buddhism
- Temple: Shancaidong Temple
- School: Linji school Tantrism
- Dharma name: Nenghai

Senior posting
- Teacher: Fo Yuan; Shi Guanyi; Khangser Rinpoche
- Students: Shi Renqing Shi Qingdong Shi Longlian Shi Wanfa Shi Zhenyi Shi Daji Shi Yongci

Chinese name
- Traditional Chinese: 釋能海
- Simplified Chinese: 释能海
Transcriptions
Standard Mandarin
- Hanyu Pinyin: Shì Nénghǎi

Birth name
- Traditional Chinese: 龔學光
- Simplified Chinese: 龚学光
Transcriptions
Standard Mandarin
- Hanyu Pinyin: Gōng Xuéguāng

Courtesy name
- Traditional Chinese: 輯熙
- Simplified Chinese: 缉熙
Transcriptions
Standard Mandarin
- Hanyu Pinyin: Jíxī

Courtesy name (also)
- Traditional Chinese: 闊初
- Simplified Chinese: 阔初
Transcriptions
Standard Mandarin
- Hanyu Pinyin: Kuòchū

Shi Nenghai (Chinese: 释能海; pinyin: Shì Nénghǎi; 20 January 1886 – 1 January 1967) was a Vajrayana Buddhist monk of the Gelug school and religious leader in modern China. He is considered one of the key figures of the "Movement of Tantric Rebirth" (密教復興運動) which sought to revitalize Chinese Esoteric Buddhism.

Nenghai was vice-president of the Buddhist Association of China. He was a member of the National Committee of the Chinese People's Political Consultative Conference and a delegate to the 1st and 2nd National People's Congress.

== Biography ==
=== Early years ===
Nenghai was born Gong Xueguang in Hanwang Town of Mianzhu city, in Sichuan province, to Gong Changyi (龔常一), a peddler. He had an elder sister. When he was a child, both his parents died, leaving only him and his 10-year-old sister. By age 14, he became an apprentice in Hengshengtong (“恒升通”匹頭業), and studied Classic and history under the proprietor. In 1905, he enrolled at the Army Academy (now Army War College), where he studied alongside Liu Xiang and Liu Wenhui. After graduating in 1907 he became a drillmaster at Yunnan Military Academy. Both Zhu De and Yang Sen were his students. Then he served as regimental commander in Sichuan government, holding the position until he was transferred to the Beijing General's Office (北京將軍府).

In 1910, Nenghai went to Japan on a political and industrial investigation. The expedition to Japan gave him exposure to Buddhism. After half year, Nenghai returned to China and studied Buddhism under Zhang Kecheng (張克誠) at Peking University. In 1917, Nenghai moved to Chengdu, capital of Sichuan province, founded the Shaocheng Society of Buddhist Studies (少城佛學社).

In 1924, he went to Tianbao Temple, the Buddhist monastery where he received the tonsure ceremony under abbot Fo Yuan (佛源), as the 44th lineage of Linji school, and received complete ordination under abbot Shi Guanyi (釋貫一), in Baoguang Temple.

=== Tibetan Vajrayana ===
His encounters with Tibetan Buddhist texts and lamas in China led him to visit Tibet several times, initially staying in Kham (1926–1927) and then to Lhasa between 1928–1932 and 1940–1941. He became the main Chinese disciple of Khangsar Rinpoché (1890–1941) at Drepung monastery and was initiated into the tantric deities of Yellow Mañjuśrī and Yamāntaka-Vajrabhairava. After his initial stay in Lhasa he moved to Mount Wutai (1934–1937), a traditional home of Chinese Vajrayana, and began teaching Buddhism to a Chinese audience. He spent his time teaching, translating and writing. In 1937, he founded the tantric Jinci Temple in the suburb of Chengdu.

Nenghai and a group of disciples from Jinci traveled to Tibet again in 1940–1941, where he received further transmission from Khangsar Rinpoché. During the following years he founded five more monasteries in the Gelugpa tradition and translated many Tibetan works into Chinese.

=== Works and teachings ===
Nenghai's works and teachings which include Tibetan and traditional Chinese Buddhist doctrines reflect his desire to infuse Chinese Buddhism with the teachings of the Tibetan tradition. His students considered that his teachings "joined purely in one doctrine Tibetan and Chinese teachings."

His works can be divided into esoteric and exoteric. His exoteric works strongly emphasized ethical discipline (sila) as the foundation for the path, following the Gelug tradition's lamrim teachings. They discuss scriptures important in Tibetan Buddhism like the Abhisamayalamkara and those important in Chinese Buddhism like the Avatamsaka Sutra. Most of his literary production though consists of translations of Tibetan tantric works.

=== Public activities and death ===
After the establishment of the Communist State, he lived in Guangji Temple, in Beijing. In October 1951, he attended the Chinese People's Political Consultative Conference as a specially invited delegate. He was a member of the Permanent Committee and vice-president of the Chinese Buddhist Association from 1953 to 1966. He also joined a Chinese delegation in Delhi for the Conference of Asian Nations.

In the summer of 1966, Mao Zedong launched the Cultural Revolution, Nenghai lived in Shancaidong Temple, he was labeled as a gangster and suffered political persecution, he and his disciples were mistreated and tortured. On January 1, 1967, Nenghai died in Shancaidong Temple, aged 81.

His relics are preserved on Mount Wutai in a stupa that was built in 1981 in the Tibeto-Chinese style.
