= Chinese Esoteric Buddhism =

Traditions of Vajrayana Buddhism

Chinese Esoteric Buddhism refers to traditions of Tantra and Esoteric Buddhism that have flourished among the Chinese people. The Tantric masters Śubhakarasiṃha, Vajrabodhi, and Amoghavajra, established the Esoteric Buddhist Zhēnyán (Chinese: 真言, "true word", "mantra") tradition from 716 to 720 during the reign of Emperor Xuanzong of Tang. It employed mandalas, mantras, mudras, abhiṣekas, and deity yoga. The Zhenyan tradition was exported to Japan as Tendai and Shingon Buddhism by Saichō and Kūkai, as well as influencing Korean Buddhism and Vietnamese Buddhism. The Song dynasty (960–1279) saw a second diffusion of Esoteric texts. Esoteric Buddhist practices continued to have an influence into the late imperial period and Tibetan Buddhism was also influential during the Yuan dynasty period and beyond. In the Ming dynasty (1368–1644) through to the modern period, esoteric practices and teachings became absorbed and merged with the other Chinese Buddhist traditions to a large extent.

In Chinese these traditions are also termed Mìjiào (密教; "Esoteric Teaching"), Mìzōng (密宗; "Esoteric Tradition") or Tángmì (唐密; "Tang (Dynasty) Esoterica").

== Terminology ==
In China and countries with large Chinese populations such as Taiwan, Malaysia, and Singapore, Chinese Esoteric Buddhism is commonly referred to as Tángmì (唐密; "Tang Dynasty Esoterica"), or Hànchuán Mìzōng (漢傳密宗; "Han Chinese Transmission of the Esoteric Tradition"), sometimes abbreviated as Hànmì (漢密; "Han Mysteries").

Its manifestation through a reimportation of the teachings via Japanese transmission is sometimes referred as Dōngmì (東密; Jpn. Tōmitsu) "the Esoteric Buddhism of Tō-ji", that is, the Esoteric Buddhist teachings brought to and promulgated in Japan at Tō-ji, a temple in Kyōtō, by the Japanese monk Kūkai (774–835).

During the Tang dynasty the actual term widely used to refer to these teachings by Tantric masters was "mantra teaching" (真言教; zhēnyán jiāo) and "path of mantras" (Mantrayana; 真言乘; Zhēnyán shèng). Chinese tantric masters like Vajrabodhi and Amoghavajra also used the term Vajrayana (金剛乘; Jīngāngshèng).

In a more general sense, the Chinese term Mìzōng (密宗; "Esoteric Tradition") and Mìjiào (密教; "Esoteric Teaching") are popular Chinese terms used when referring to any form of Esoteric Buddhism.

== History ==
According to scholars such as Henrik Sørensen, Esoteric Buddhism emerged in India out of Mahayana Buddhist ritual and magical practices. Esoteric teachings followed the Silk Road and the Southeast Asian Maritime trade routes into China, linking Chinese Buddhism with Indian, South Asian and Indonesian Esoteric Buddhism. The use of mantras and dhāraṇīs dates at least to the 2nd century. Tantric materials with mantras and dharanis begin to appear in China during the fifth century. Early Chinese Buddhists include the like of Zhu Lüyan, who translated the first text containing dhāraṇīs, the Modengqie jing (T.D. no. 1300). Others such as Fotudeng (d. 348) served Chinese emperors with mantras and rituals.

The use of mandalas (Chinese: 曼荼羅) in China as goes back to the sixth century. While these elements were present, it is with the rise of esoteric Buddhism during the Tang dynasty that a full ritual system arose.

=== Tang dynasty ===
The Tang dynasty saw the growth to prominence of Chinese Tantric Buddhism. Early Tang translators such as Atikūta, Bodhiruci, Yijing, and Manicintana worked on esoteric texts promoting mantras and dharanis such as the Collection of Coded Instructions (Dhāraṇīsaṃgraha sūtra; Chinese: 陀羅尼集經; pinyin: Tuóluóní jí jīng; T. 901), early versions of the Heart-dhāraṇī of Avalokiteśvara-ekadaśamukha Sūtra, the Cintāmaṇicakra Dhāraṇī Sūtra and various sutras related to Amoghapāśa translated by Bodhiruci which contain the Mantra of Light.

These early esoteric works focus on dharani recitation (and sometimes add the use of images, altars, mandalas or visualization). Koichi Shinohara has argued that the earliest layer consisted of sutras that promoted simple recitation of dharanis and that more complex elements (such as use of images, complex arrangements of mandalas, etc.) were added to this core practice over time. The complexity of the rituals continued to increase until reaching the "full" or "pure" tantric texts like the Vairocanābhisaṃbodhi Sūtra. As Shinohara notes, the early "esoteric" texts were not initially considered a separate category of "tantric" or "esoteric" sutras, and they were not seen as separate from mainstream Mahayana.

During the eighth century, three great masters (acharyas) came from India to China: Śubhakarasiṃha (637–735), Vajrabodhi (671–741) and Amoghavajra (705–774). These three masters brought the esoteric teachings to their height of popularity in China. Major tantric texts introduced by these masters included the Vairocanābhisaṃbodhi Sūtra and the Vajrasekhara Sutra, as well as numerous commentaries and ritual manuals. It was at this point that "esoteric Buddhism" began to be seen as a distinct and unique system of its own, with special rites of consecration or initiation (abhiseka).

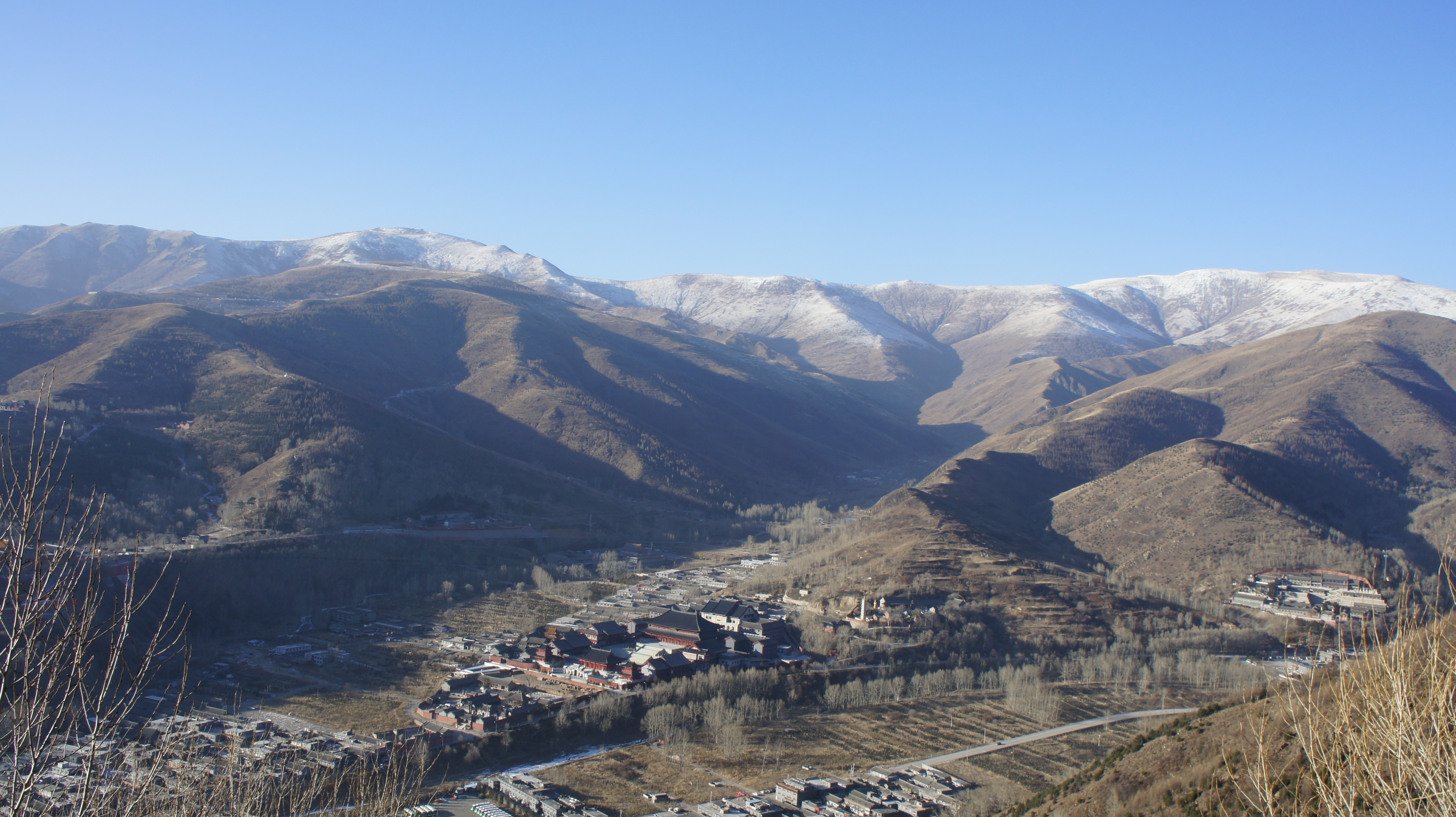
Buddhist temples at Mount Wutai

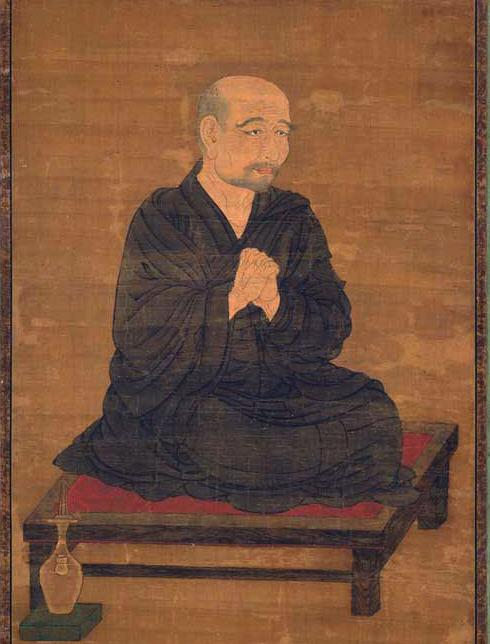
Portrait of Amoghavajra, fourteenth century, Tokyo National Museum

As Charles D. Orzech writes, outlining the growth of this tradition:

We first see the translation of a variety of texts representative of the growing interest in mantra and dhāraṇī. Many of these texts promote a particular dhāraṇī, ritual, and deity. Second, we see the advent of texts representing distinct and comprehensive systems that are meant to codify the swelling tide of mantric texts, deities, and techniques. Full entry into these systems was accessed only through abhiseka, effecting the ritual transformation of a disciple into a cosmic overlord. Third, these overarching systems were given what amounts to imperial imprimatur during the twenty year period from the 760s into the 780s. During this period, particularly during the period of Daizong's 代宗 (r. 762–779) support of Amoghavajra (Bukong jin'gang 不空金剛 704–774), significant religious and institutional infrastructure was put in place, including imperially sanctioned altars for abhiseka in certain monasteries and imperial palaces for the performance of rituals to benefit the state; construction projects, including the renovation of Jin'ge Monastery 金閣寺 on Mount Wutai 五台山; and the installation of Mañjuśrī as the patron in official government monasteries.

According to Geoffrey C. Goble, Amoghavajra was the most influential of these and is to be considered as the true founder of the Zhenyan or Mantra Tradition. He translated the largest number of texts (second only to Xuanzang), performed rituals for the royal family, taught disciples from Japan and Korea and was the first to be bestowed Tang imperial titles. Goble also argues that the reason that Tantric Buddhism became popular in this period lies in the similarity between their Buddhist rituals and pre-existing Tang state rites which were supposed to support the emperor by granting political stability and imperial longevity.

Amoghavajra assisted the Tang dynasty state against the An Lushan rebellion. He carried out Vajrayana rituals which were ostensible effective in supernaturally attacking and destroying An Lushan's army including the death of one of An Lushan's generals, Zhou Zhiguang.

Amoghavajra used his rituals against An Lushan while staying in Chang'an when it was occupied in 756 while the Tang dynasty crown prince and Xuanzong emperor had retreated to Sichuan. Amoghavajra's rituals were explicitly intended to introduced death, disaster and disease against An Lushan. As a result of Amoghavajrya's assistance in crushing An Lushan, Estoteric Buddhism became the official state Buddhist sect supported by the Tang dynasty, "Imperial Buddhism" with state funding and backing for writing scriptures, and constructing monasteries and temples. The disciples of Amoghavajra did ceremonies for the state and emperor. Tang dynasty Emperor Suzong was crowned as cakravartin by Amoghavajra after victory against An Lushan in 759 and he had invoked the Acala vidyaraja against An Lushan. The Tang dynasty crown prince Li Heng (later Suzong) also received important strategic military information from Chang'an when it was occupied by An Lushan though secret message sent by Amoghavajra.

There is less information about the Tantric Buddhists that came after Amoghavajra, like his descendants Huilang and Huiguo. Prajña (Chinese: 般若; pinyin: Bōrě; 744–c. 810) was one of the last great translators of the Tang, known for his translation of the Gaṇdavyūha sūtra. Despite lacking the strong patronage it enjoyed under Emperor Daizong (r. 762–779), there is evidence that Zhenyan practices and rituals continued to be a key part of Chinese Buddhism throughout the ninth century. Even after the Great Anti-Buddhist Persecution (845 CE) initiated by Emperor Wuzong of Tang, the Zhenyan tradition continued to transmit and practice the yoga of Mantrayana well into the early Song Dynasty, as shown by the records of Japanese pilgrims.

==== Influence ====
Due to this newfound influence and prestige, Esoteric Buddhism strongly influenced the rest of Chinese Buddhism during the Tang dynasty. This prestige also drew East Asian pilgrims to esoteric centers such as Qinglong Temple (青龍寺) and Daxingshan Temple (大興善寺). The Mantrayana tradition also influenced other Chinese Buddhist schools like Huayan, Tiantai, Chan Buddhism and Pure Land Buddhism, through the adoption of mantras, dhāraṇīs, ritual forms as well as the construction of altars. This prestige also influenced the popularization of esoteric deities such as various forms of Avalokiteśvara and Vajrapāṇi which became the focus of wider devotion.

In Chinese Buddhism there was no major distinction between exoteric and esoteric practices and the Northern School of Chan even became known for its esoteric practices of dhāraṇīs and mantras. Śubhakarasiṃha's most eminent disciple, Yi Xing, who was an influential Zhenyan figure in his own right, later practiced Chan Buddhism. The followers of the Baotang school of Chan, founded by Baotang Wuzhu also seem to have had a strong affiliation with the Zhenyan tradition.

On the other hand, while the East Asian Yogācāra school of Xuanzang and the Tiantai of Zhiyi already included certain esoteric practices and texts before the rise of Tang Mantrayana, the influence of esoteric elements of these schools seems to have grown during the era of Tang esoterica.

There is also evidence that esoteric Buddhist practices also influenced developments in Taoism.

The growth of esoteric practice in the Tang era is also evident outside the Chinese heartland such as in Dunhuang, Central Asia, Yunnan and Nanzhao.

==== Spread outside China ====
Before the Great Anti-Buddhist Persecution, Master Kūkai (774–835), also known as Kōbō Daishi, came to Tang China from Japan to learn the complete esoteric teachings expounded by the three Indian masters. Kōbō Daishi was taught by the great Master Huiguo (746–805; Japanese: Keika). It is claimed that he learned the complete teachings in two years before returning to Japan. The transmission to Japan later became Shingon Buddhism (真言宗), which is often referred to in Chinese as Dōngmì (東密), "Eastern Esoterica", because Japan is east of China geographically. The term (in Japanese, tōmitsu) refers to the temple Tō-ji (東寺, literally Eastern Temple) at Kyoto, Japan, where Kōbō Daishi established the Shingon school of Buddhism. This differentiates it from the Esoteric practices that Saichō (767–822) brought to Japan that became the Japanese lineage of Tendai (天台宗), which is called taimitsu (台密 Ch. Táimì, lit. "Esoteric Buddhism of [Ten]dai"). Tōmitsu and Taimitsu are the two main systems of Esoteric Buddhism in Japan.

Esoteric Buddhism also entered the Korean kingdom of Goryeo (918–1392).

=== Liao, Song and Jin era ===
The Zhenyan tradition continued through the end of the Tang into the early Song dynasty (960–1279), though in a more limited capacity than under the Tang, as noted by Zanning 贊寧 (919–1001), a Chan Buddhist of the Fayan school who also embraced esoteric teachings, unlike Linji Chan who championed a Chan that was "outside the scriptures". Song emperors did continue to patronize Buddhism and translations efforts. Esoteric deities like Mahavairocana, Thousand-armed Guanyin and Mārīcī also continued to be popular as well as the use of spells and dharani. The prestige of the esoteric tradition influenced other schools of Chinese Buddhism such as Chan and Tiantai to adopt esoteric practices as well, leading to a merging of teachings between the various schools which continued on through the Yuan, Ming and Qing dynasties to the modern period.

Esoteric Buddhism was also present in the Khitan Liao dynasty and the Tangut Western Xia. The Xia in particular adopted Tibetan Buddhist influences and produced many translations into the Tangut language and artistic works, many of which have been preserved in the findings at Khara-Khoto. Following the Liao, the Jin dynasty saw a continuation of the forms of Buddhism that existed in the Liao.

=== Yuan dynasty Vajrayana ===
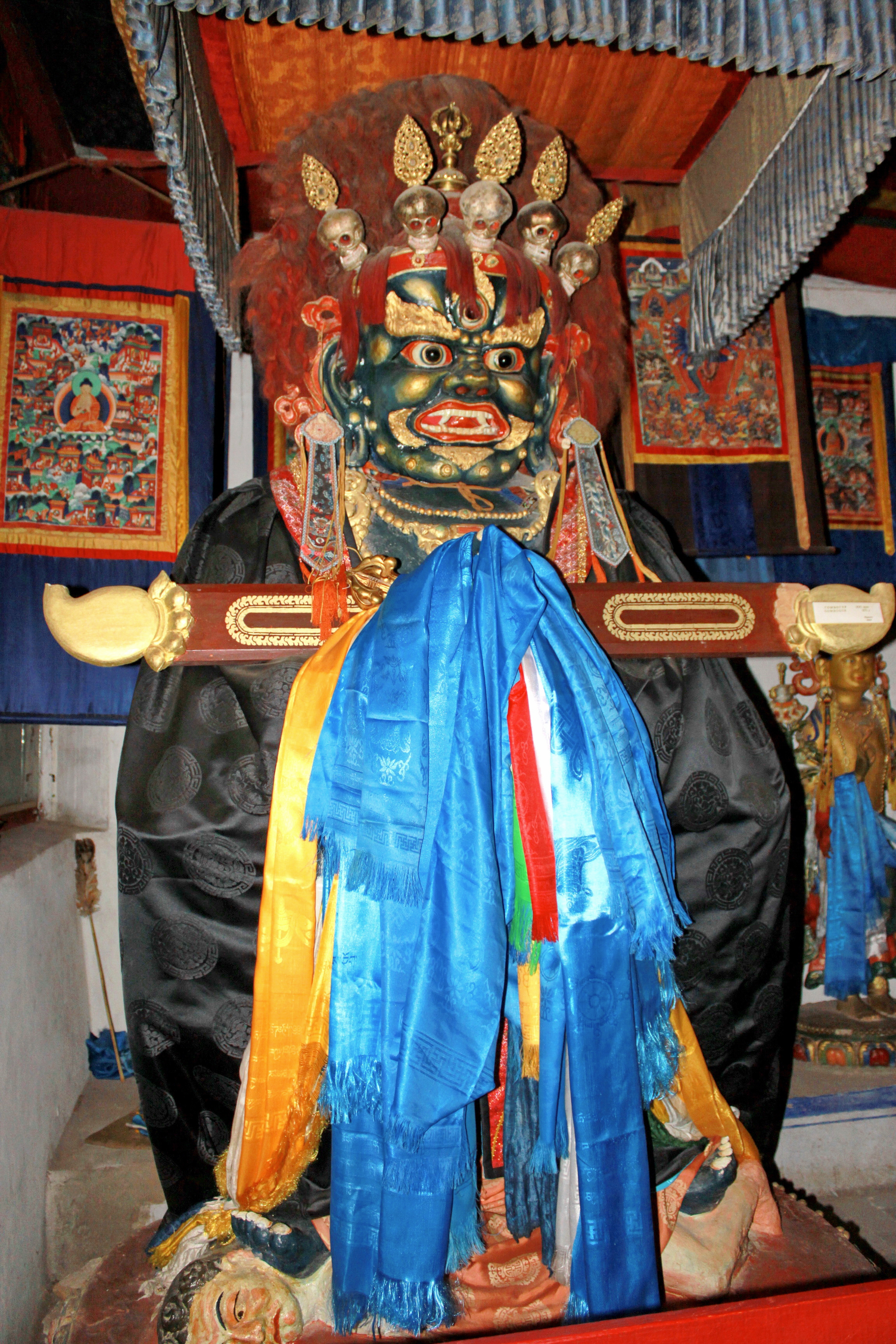
Mongolian Sita Mahakala (Gonggor), Erdene Zuu Monastery

Vajrayana had also become the major religion of Tibet and the Western Xia by the time of the rise of the Mongol Empire in the thirteenth century. As the Tibetan and Tangut peoples came under the rule of Mongol leaders during the reign of Möngke Khan (1209–1259), they increased their missionary activity in Mongolian lands, eventually converting the leadership and much of the population as well aiding in the translation of Buddhist texts into Mongolian. So it is no surprise that after the Mongol conquest of China and their establishment of the Yuan dynasty (1271–1368), the Yuan emperors made Tibetan Buddhism the official religion of China, and Tibetan monks (or, as they were called in Chinese, "barbarian monks from the West", Chinese: 西番僧) were given patronage at the court. Lamas of the Sakya school like Sakya Pandita and also of the Kagyu became imperial preceptors of the Mongol Khans. The tantric deity Mahakala was used in military campaign to protect the armies during their war against China and became the protector deity of the Yuan state. They were granted unprecedented status and privileges such as temple offerings and shrines.

The introduction of "the secret teaching of supreme bliss" (tantric sexual practice) caused quite a scandal among Chinese literati. A common perception among some Chinese was that this patronage of lamas caused corrupt forms of tantra to become widespread. When the Mongol Yuan dynasty was overthrown and the Ming dynasty was established, the Mongol sponsored lamas were expelled from the court and Vajrayana Buddhism was denounced by some as not being an orthodox path. It was demonized as a form of sorcery and licentiousness that led to the downfall of the Yuan.

However, despite these attacks Tibetan Vajrayana continued to spread in China after the downfall of the Yuan. The rulers of the Ming were also enthusiastic about Tibetan tantric Buddhism. Many translation of Tibetan texts into Chinese were also made during the Yuan and texts associated with Sakya lam bras teachings have been identified as having been disseminated during the Ming (1368–1644) and Qing (1644–1912) periods, and in the Republic of China (1912–1949).

=== Ming and Qing dynasties ===
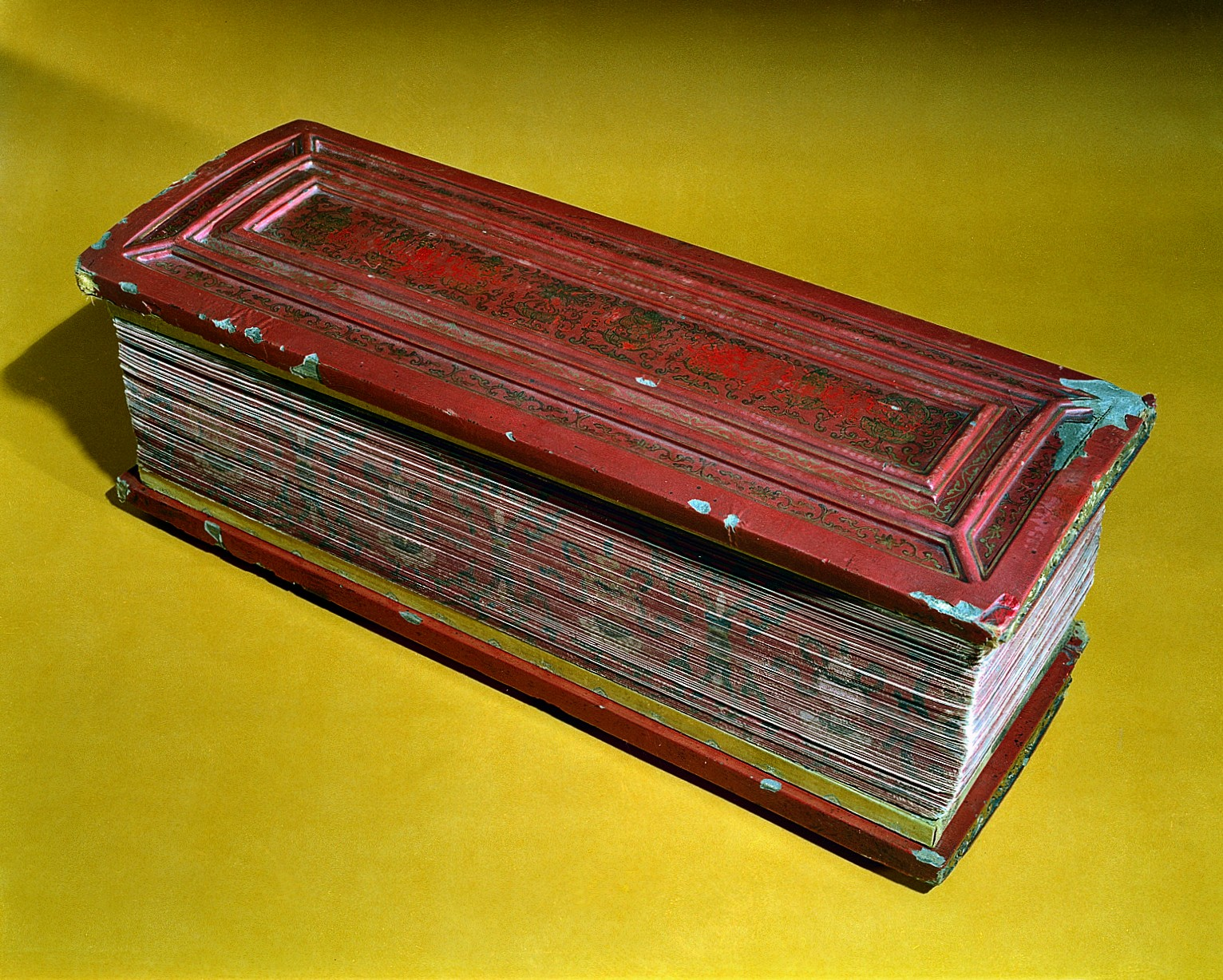
A section of the Manchu edition of the Kangyur canon

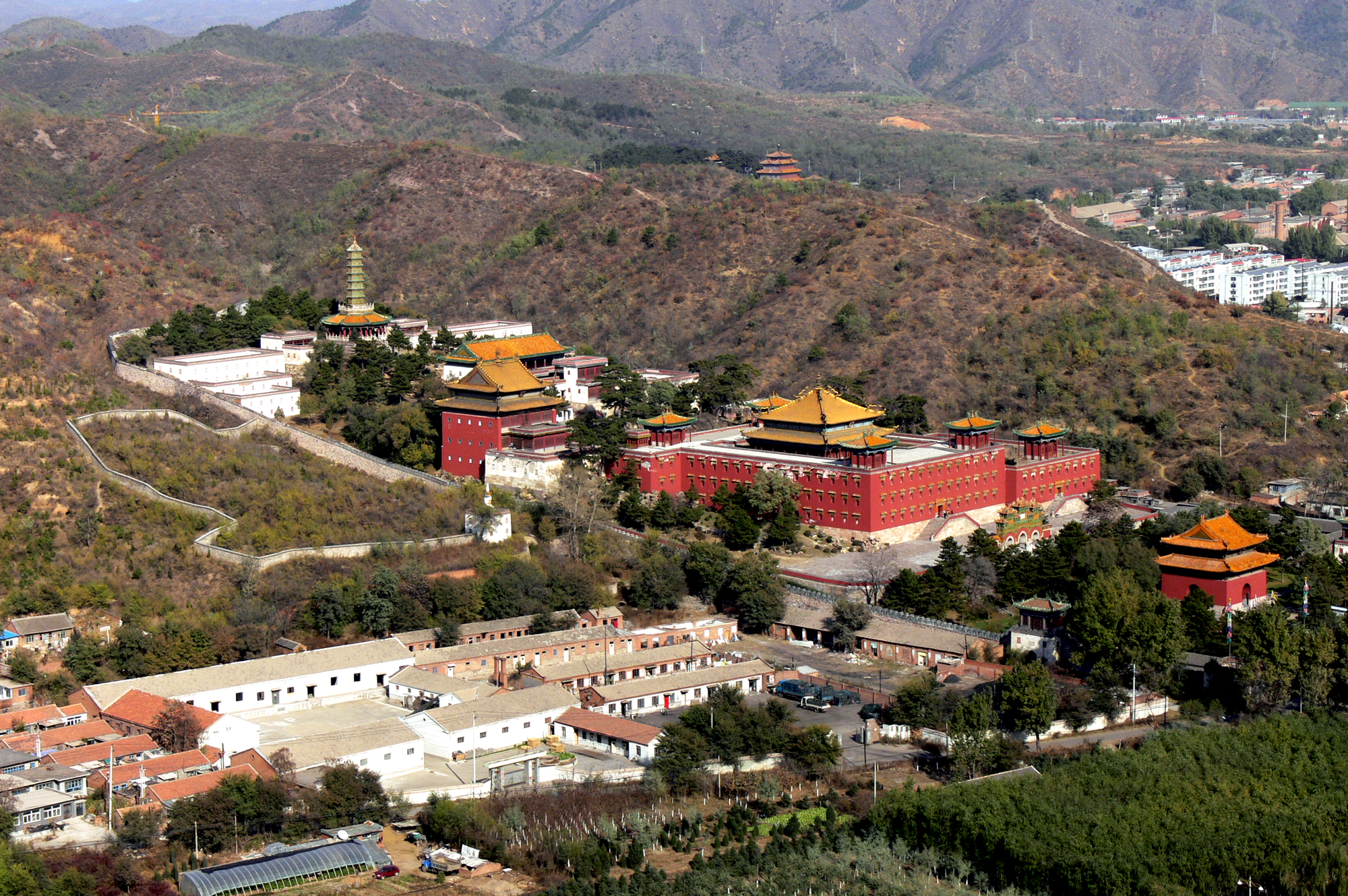
Xumi Fushou Temple, Chengde.

During the Ming dynasty (1368–1644), the emperors such as the Yongle Emperor (r. 1402–1424) continued to support and invite Tibetan lamas to court, including Deshin Shekpa, 5th Karmapa Lama. Tibetan Buddhism thus continued to spread among the elite and the wider populace. The rule of the Yongle emperor also saw the carving of printing blocks for the first printed Kangyur known thus far, known as "the Yongle Kanjur". This was the earliest and one of the most authoritative versions of the Tibetan canon, and it contributed to the further spread of Tibetan Buddhism in China, Tibet and Mongolia. There were also many translations of Tibetan tantric works into Chinese during this period. Another edition of the Tibetan canon was further printed in Beijing in 1606.

During the Xuanzong reign (1398–1435), Tibetan monks were allowed back into the palace and also allowed to live in Beijing. The Zhengde Emperor (r. 1491–1521) was known as a Vajrayana practitioner and a promoter of Tibetan Buddhism, but his successor, the Jiajing Emperor (r. 1521–1566), was a Daoist who persecuted Buddhists.

Among the common populace Tibetan Buddhism seems to have grown in popularity. A profitable business was the selling of Dharma instruments at the capital and one report states that "men and women in the capital filled the street" for Tibetan monks in Beijing. Tibetan-style ceremonies also became fashionable for weddings and funerals of the rich. Many Ming literati and courtiers continued to attack and ridicule the religion as demon worship and sorcery.

The Qing dynasty (1644–1912) court promoted the Gelug school of Tibetan Buddhism, which was the official religion of the Manchu state. The 5th Dalai Lama visited Beijing during the reign of the Shunzhi Emperor and likewise Lobsang Palden Yeshe, 6th Panchen Lama visited the Qianlong emperor during his 70th birthday at Chengde in 1780 showing the importance of Tibetan Buddhism during this era. To mark the occasion, the Qianlong Emperor had the Xumi Fushou Temple built in Tibetan style and showered the Panchen Lama with riches. The Tibetan style Puning Temple and Putuo Zongcheng Temple were also built during the reign of the Qianglong Emperor. The Qianglong Emperor was also a promoter of the arts which flourished in his reign, and he was particularly fond of Tibetan thangkas.

The wars and rebellions which racked the later Qing saw the weakening of state-sponsored esoteric Buddhism. Robert Gimello has observed that in late imperial China esoteric dharani practices continued and esoteric practices associated with Cundī were extremely popular among both the populace and the elite.

=== Modern era ===
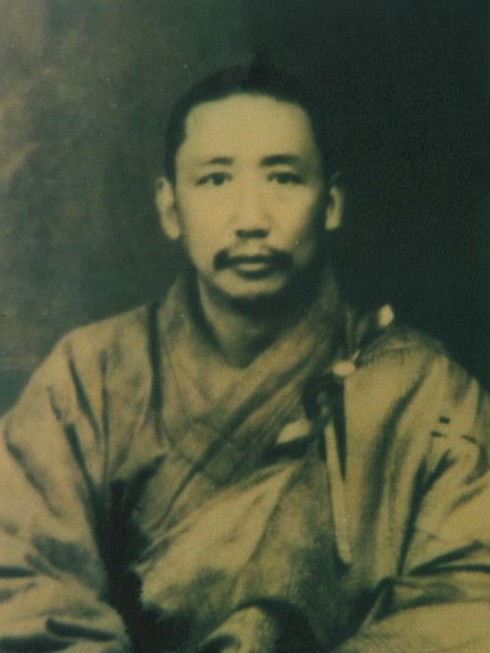
Nenghai Lama (能海喇嘛, 1886–1967)

==== Tibetan Buddhism ====
During the Republic of China (1912–1949), the government believed that esoteric Buddhism had become weakened after the Tang and thus sought to revitalize it by returning to either Tibet or Japan to revitalize Chinese Buddhism.

During this period, Tibetans traveled to China to teach, and Chinese monks traveled to Tibet to study, including influential monks like Nenghai (能海喇嘛, 1886–1967) and Master Fazun (法尊, 1902–1980), who played major roles in the spread of Tibetan Buddhism and translation of scriptures into modern Chinese. These two figures, both of the Gelug school, were key in what is known as the "Chinese Tantric Buddhist Revival Movement" (Chinese: 密教復興運動). Chinese Buddhists like Dayong (1893–1929) also went to Japan to learn and bring back the complete teachings of Tang Mysteries passed down in Tendai and Shingon Buddhism.

Most of this movement's work was severely damaged by the Cultural Revolution. But Tibetan Buddhism continued to flourish outside communist China in places like Hong Kong and Taiwan, and since the 80s and 90s, in mainland China itself. However, Tibetan Buddhists remain under serious government surveillance and control in the mainland.

Monica Esposito has also written about a Chinese lama who taught Chan Buddhism and the Nyingma Dzogchen tradition, known as Fahai Lama (1920–1991). Fahai attempted to reconcile Tantrism and Chan, claiming that Dzogchen "can be aligned with the overcoming of the last barrier in Chan". Fahai Lama also built a monastery for nuns on Tianmu Mountain in Zhejiang.

According to Dan Smyer Yü's recent monograph on the subject, Tibetan Buddhism is currently experiencing a revival in certain regions such as Qinghai and Sichuan, which he describes as "trans-cultural, cross-regional, tech-savvy, conversant with modern science and familiar with the economic system". Gray Tuttle has noted that Mount Wutai has experienced a growth of religious activity since the 1990s, led by Han, Tibetan and Mongol followers of Tibetan Buddhism. Temples, monasteries and stupas have been built or repaired in the area.

There are also some newer Chinese tantric Buddhists that do not have direct association with traditional institutions, one of the most successful (and controversial within other organized Buddhist groups) being Lu Sheng-yen's True Buddha School, a new religious movement that identifies as Vajrayana Buddhist while also adopting local Chinese and Taiwanese popular religious ideas.

==== Chinese Buddhism ====
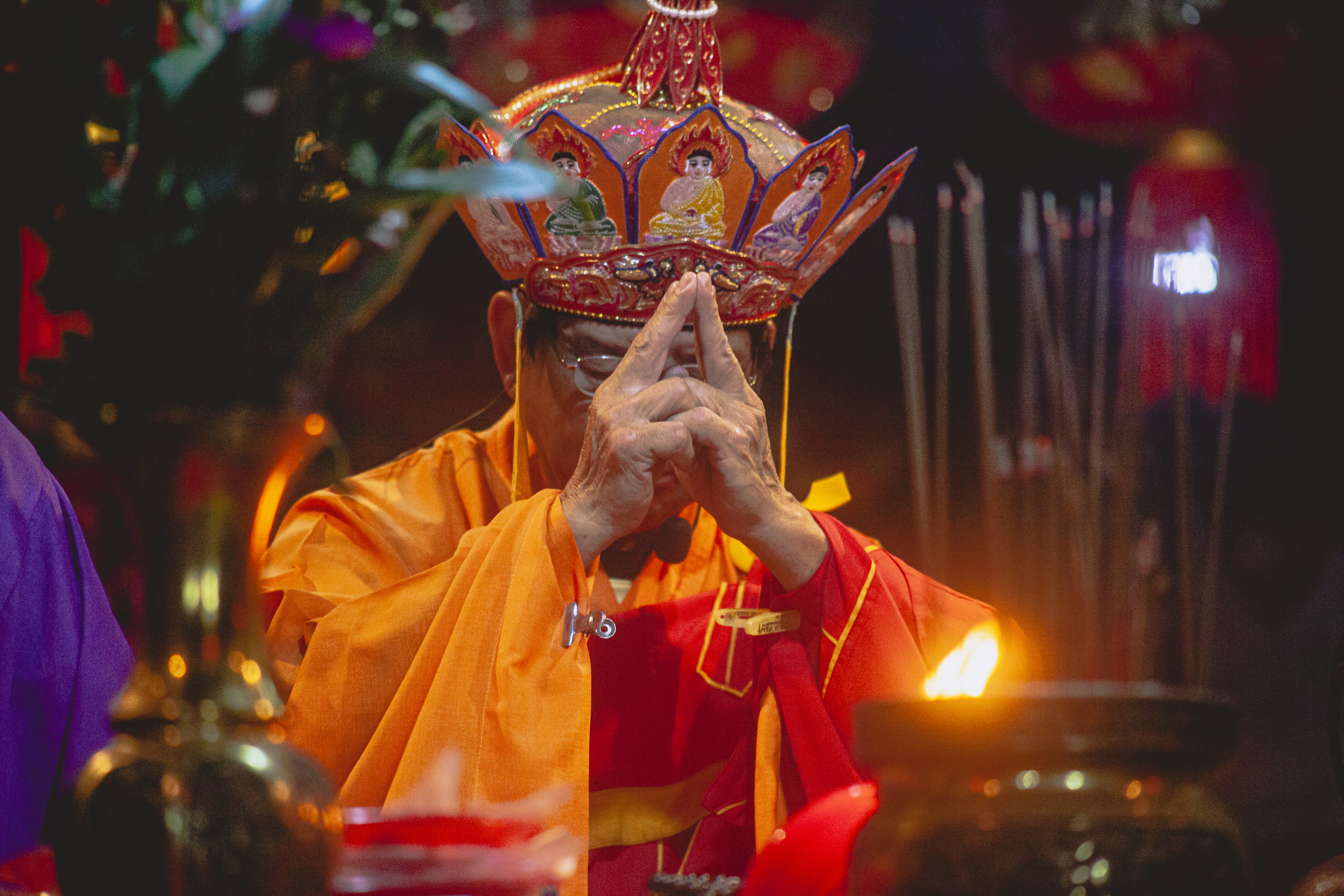
The vajrācārya of a Yujia Yankou ritual performing a mudrā while wearing a Five Buddha crown adorned with images of the Five Tathāgatas

In contemporary times, esoteric traditions are deeply embedded in mainstream Chinese Buddhism and expressed through various rituals which make use of tantric dhāraṇīs, mudrās, maṇḍalas and the veneration of certain tantric deities like Cundi and Acala.

One example of esoteric teachings still practiced in many Chinese Buddhist monasteries is the Śūraṅgama Sūtra and the dhāraṇī revealed within it, the Śūraṅgama Mantra, which are especially influential in the Chinese Chan tradition. Another example is the popular Yujia Yankou ritual, where monastics take on the role of a vajrācārya and performs deity yoga through the usage of mantras, mudrās and maṇḍala offerings in order to help facilitate the nourishment and ultimate liberation of all sentient beings. In particular, the usage of mantras, mudrās and maṇḍalas in the ritual correspond directly to the concept of the "Three Mysteries" (Chinese: 三密; pinyin: Sānmì) in tantric Buddhism: the "secrets" of body, speech and mind. This ritual is commonly performed during or at the end of regular religious temple events such as repentance rites, Buddha recitation retreats, the dedication of a new monastic complex or gatherings for the transmission of monastic vows. It is also widely performed as a post-mortem rite within Chinese society during funerals and other related occasions such as the Ghost Festival. A related ritual that also involve esoteric practices is the extensive Shuilu Fahui ceremony, which involves setting up maṇḍalas of esoteric deities such as the Ten Wisdom Kings as well as the invocation of those deities to the ritual space via mantras, mudrās and visualization.

==== Modern esoteric Buddhism in China ====
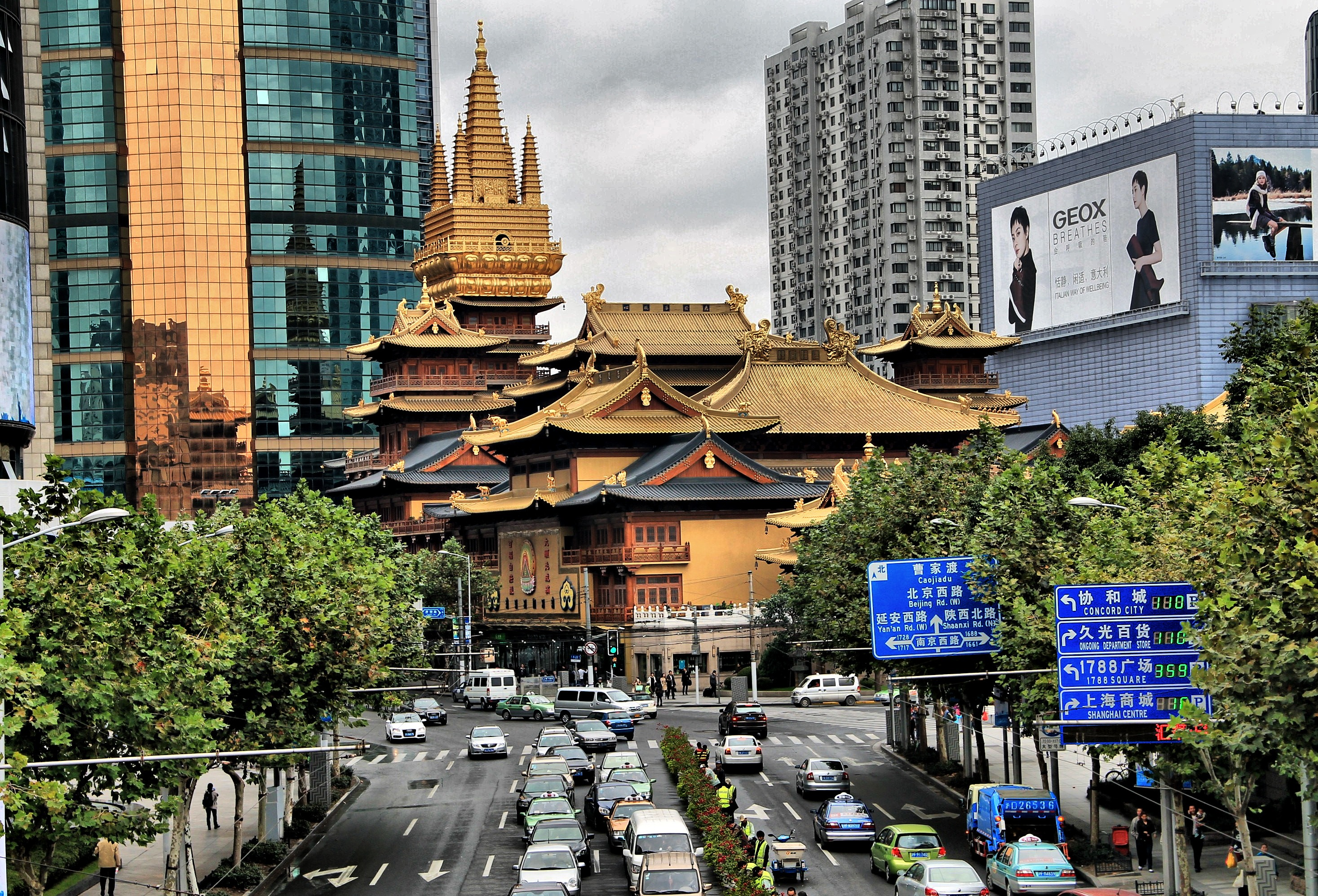
The Jing'an Temple in Shanghai, China, has adopted the Zhenyan tradition in modern times.

In contemporary China, Taiwan, and elsewhere in East Asia where Chinese populations are prevalent, there is an ongoing revival of Tang Esoteric Buddhism. The majority of this revival has been spearheaded by Chinese Buddhists who have re-imported esoteric practices and teachings from Japanese Shingon. There are also a smattering of centers that have support from Kongōbu-ji, the head temple of the Kōyasan Shingon-shū (the school of Shingon Buddhism of Mount Kōya) and its affiliate temples.

The revival is mainly propagated by Chinese Buddhist monks and laypersons who travel to Mount Kōya to be trained, initiated, and receive dharma transmission as acharyas in the Shingon tradition and who bring the esoteric teachings and practices back to their homeland after their training has ended. One example of temples which have been subject to this revival are Qinglong Temple in Xi'an, which is the ancestral temple where Huiguo originally taught Kōbō Daishi the esoteric teachings before the latter brought them into Japan. Another example is Daxingshan Temple, also in Xi'an, where the three patriarchs, Śubhakarasiṃha, Vajrabodhi and Amoghavajra, originally taught esoteric Buddhism. Jing'an Temple in Shanghai is also a prominent example, being founded by the eminent Republican-era monk Master Chisong (釋持松), who had been initiated into the Shingon sect and trained as an acharya.

While some of these Chinese acharyas have chosen to officially remain under the oversight of Kōyasan Shingon-shū or Shingon-shu Buzan-ha and minister as Chinese branches of Japanese Shingon, many other acharyas have chosen to distinguish themselves from Shingon by establishing their own Chinese lineages after their return from Japan. Members from the latter group, while deriving their orthodoxy and legitimacy from their Shingon masters in Japan, view themselves as re-establishing a distinctly Chinese tradition of Esoteric Buddhism rather than merely acting as emissaries of Japanese Shingon, in the same way that Kūkai started his own Japanese sect of Esoteric Buddhism after learning it from Chinese teachers. Some examples are:

- Mantra School Bright Lineage (真言宗光明流), which has branches in Taiwan and Hong Kong.
- The Hong Kong Mantra School for Lay Buddhists (香港佛教真言宗居士林), located in Hong Kong
- Samantabhadra Lineage (真言宗普賢流), which is mainly located in Taiwan.
  - Established the Chinese Mahayana Buddhist Academy (中華大乘佛學會).
- Malaysian Mahā Praṇidhāna Parvata Mantrayāna (马来西亚佛教 真言宗大願山), which is located in Malaysia.
- Minh Nguyệt Cư Sĩ Lâm (明月居士林), located primarily in Vietnam with branches in the United States and Canada.
- Xiu Ming Society (修明堂), which is located primarily in Hong Kong, but also has branches in Mainland China and Taiwan.
- Mahavairocana Temple (大毘盧寺), which has branches in Taiwan and America.
- Yuanrong Buddhist Academy (圓融佛學院), located in Hong Kong.
- Mount Qinglong Acala Monastery (青龍山不動寺), located in Taiwan.

== Common practices ==
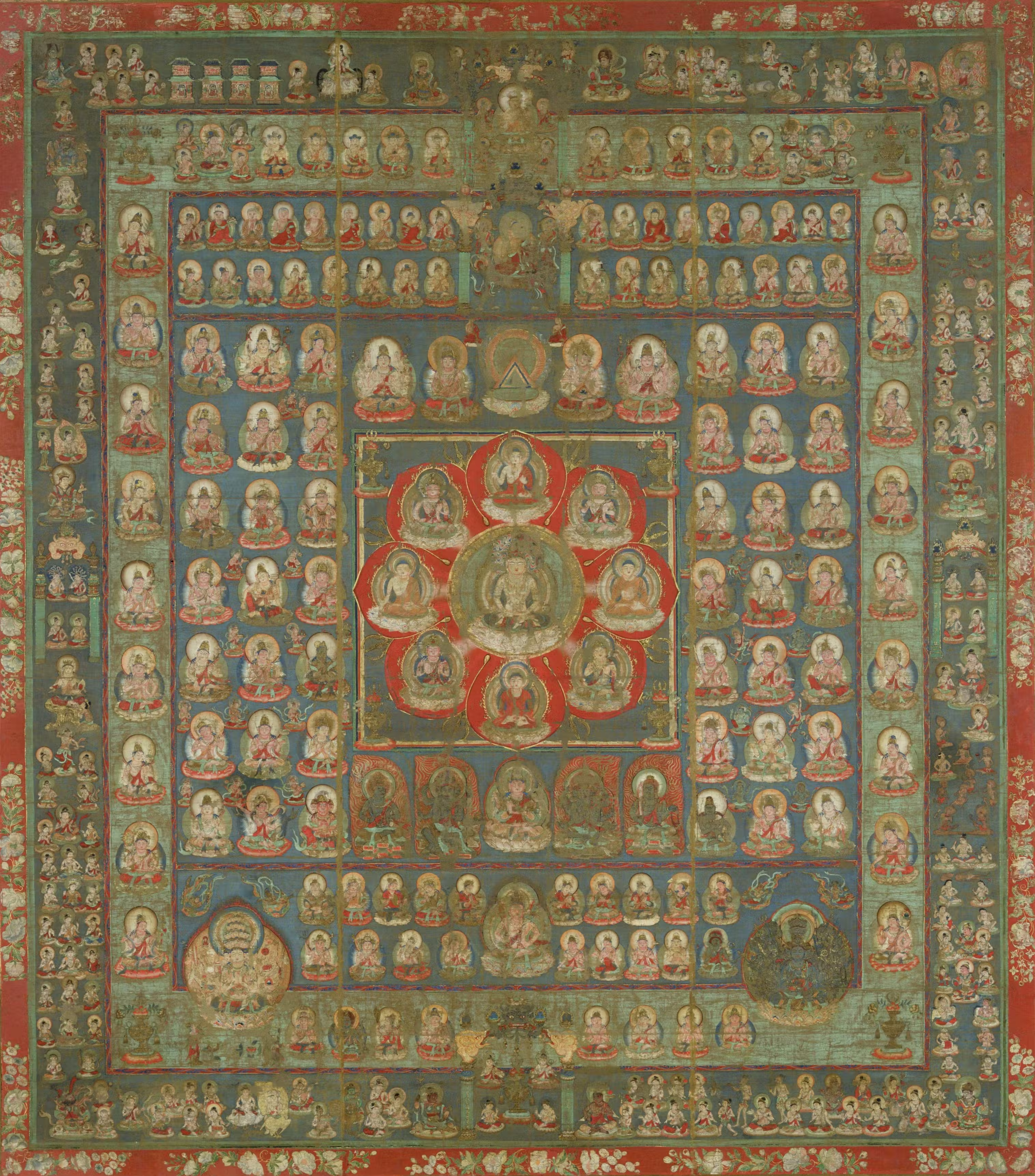
The Womb Realm maṇḍala used in Śubhakarasiṃha's teachings from the Mahavairocana Tantra. Vairocana is located in the center.

According to Charles D. Orzech and Henrik H. Sørensen, "Buddhist practice involving the use of mudra, mantra and mandala are often regarded as the primary hallmarks of esoteric Buddhism." These "three modes of action" or "ritual technologies" are often tied to the concept of the "Three Mysteries" (sanmi 三密), the "secrets" of body, speech and mind and to the ritual of abhisheka or consecration where tantric vows of samaya were undertaken by initiates.

According to Śubhākarasiṃha, "The three modes of action are simply the three secrets, and the three secrets are simply the three modes of action. The three bodies are simply the wisdom of tathāgata Mahavairocana."

Orzech and Sørensen describe the tantric ritual of abhiseka as follows:

The vows are whispered in the ear of the candidate as he or she first prepares to enter the mandala. While blindfolded, the aspirant tosses a flower onto the mandala to establish a karmic affinity with a particular deity of the mandala. The blindfold is removed and the aspirant then glimpses the mandala for the first time. On the following day the initiate will begin the process of learning how to visualize the deities of the mandala—usually Mahāvairocana and Vajrasattva.

Afterwards, the initiate is taught the secret mudras and mantras of his deity, and these secrets are revealed to be none other than the expression of the mind of the Buddhas. Through the use of the "three mysteries" the initiate is seen to ritually replicate the body, speech, and mind of the Buddha; and through the ritual of abhisheka ̣one becomes a living Buddha.

Other features that are uniquely esoteric include homa rituals, ajikan (阿字観) and dharani. The use of ritual magic and spells for spiritual and worldly benefit was also a feature of Chinese esoteric Buddhism. There was also the practice of astrology, demonology, the use of talismans and mediumship.

According to Hsuan Hua, the most popular example of esoteric teachings still practiced in many Chan monasteries of East Asia is the Śūraṅgama Sūtra and its dhāraṇī, the Śūraṅgama Mantra, along with the Nīlakaṇṭha Dhāraṇī.

== Deities ==
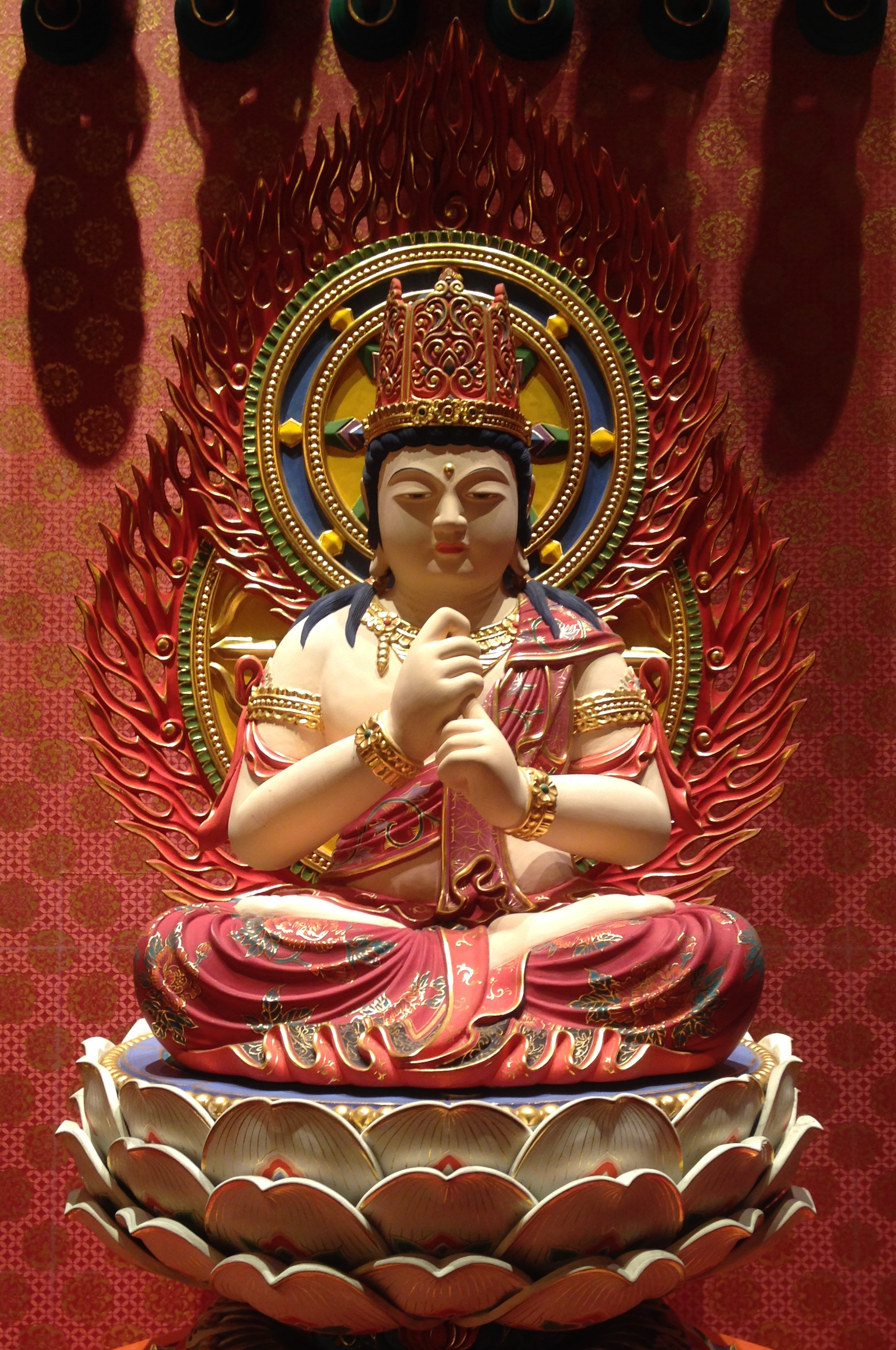
Vairocana at Buddha Tooth Relic Temple and Museum in Chinatown, Singapore

The esoteric Buddhist pantheon was mostly imported from India, but also came to include local influences. The major Buddha figures such as Mahavairocana were revered along with the retinues of their mandalas. Esoteric Buddhism saw shift from the historical Gautama Buddha to the transcendental Mahavairocana, also termed the "Great Sun". Gautama was considered a form of Mahavairocana, the eternal Buddha and dharmakāya. The major Buddhas of the esoteric pantheon are the Five Tathagatas.

Other Buddhist deities in Chinese esotericism included Bhaisajyaguru, Avalokiteśvara (especially the thousand armed form), Hayagrīva, Tārā, Vajrapāṇi, Vajrasattva, Samantabhadra, Mañjuśrī, Acala and Cundī. The Tantric goddess Cundi was the object of popular occult practice in Chinese Buddhism from the Tang dynasty and continued afterwards with the adoption of esotericism by other forms of Buddhism in China.

The Five Wisdom Kings were also important protector figures in Zhenyan Buddhism.

Besides Buddhas and bodhisattvas, there are also deities such as Śakra (Indra) (Yintuoluo 因陀羅), Brahma (Fantian 梵天), Vāyu (Fengtian 風天) and Candra (Yuetian 月天).

== Texts ==
The major Tantric texts of this tradition are part of the Chinese Buddhist canon found in volumes 18 to 21 of the Taishō Tripiṭaka. They include:

Volume 18

1. Mahavairocana Tantra and related texts (大日經類)
2. Vajraśekhara Sūtra and related texts (金剛頂經類), including the Guhyasamāja Tantra and the Hevajra tantra
3. Susuddhikara sūtra and related texts (蘇悉地經類)
4. Homa manuals (護摩儀軌類)
5. Texts dealing with initiation rites (受戒法類)

Volume 19

1. Ritual texts for buddhas (諸佛儀軌類)
2. Ritual texts for buddha-crowns (諸佛頂儀軌類)
3. Ritual texts for sūtras (諸經儀軌類)

Volume 20

1. Ritual texts for Avalokiteśvara (諸觀音儀軌類)
2. Ritual texts for bodhisattvas (諸菩薩儀軌類)
3. Ritual texts for Mañjuśrī (文殊儀軌類)

Volume 21

1. Ritual texts for vidyārājas (諸明王儀軌類)
2. Ritual texts for gods, etc. (諸天等儀軌類)
3. Dhāraṇī sūtras (諸陀羅尼經類)

There are other Chinese esoteric works outside the Chinese Tripitaka, including material found at Dunhuang, and from the texts found in Yunnan.

== See also ==
- Buddhist deities
- Buddhism in China
- Chinese Buddhism
- Chinese folk religion
- Newar Buddhism
- Shingon Buddhism
- Tibetan Buddhism
- Indonesian Esoteric Buddhism
- Vajrayana
