= Tattvasaṃgraha Tantra =

Indian Buddhist tantric text

The Sarvatathāgatatattvasaṃgraha sutra (Sanskrit, Compendium of the Reality of All Tathāgatas), also known as the Tattvasaṃgraha Tantra, is an important seventh century Indian Buddhist tantric text. Although the scripture refers itself as a Mahayana sutra, the content is mainly tantric in nature and thus is sometimes called a tantra. This work is an important source for the Chinese Esoteric Buddhist and Shingon tradition.

This text was very important for the development of the Vajrayana Yoga tantra traditions in India, Tibet, China, Japan and Sumatra, amongst others. The Tattvasaṃgraha is extant in Sanskrit, Tibetan and Chinese.

Weinberger (2003: p. 4) holds:

The Compendium of Principles marks the emergence of mature Indian Buddhist tantra at the end of the seventh century, and it immediately spawned a body of literary progeny that has played a central and enduring role in the development of tantric Buddhism in India, Tibet, China, and Japan. Consolidated over time into traditions known in some Indian circles as Yoga Tantra, they spread as widely as Śrı Lanka, Southeast Asia, Khotan, Mongolia, and Sumatra.

== Etymology ==
Tattvasaṃgraha may be parsed into 'tattva'+'saṃgraha'. Tattva may be parsed into 'Tat'+'tva' and may also be orthographically rendered in English as Tattwa and means 'thatness', 'principle', 'reality' or 'truth'. 'Saṃgraha' may be parsed into 'saṃ'+'graha'. 'Saṃ' may be spelled as either 'sam' or 'san' as the anunasika ṃ indicates a nasalization of the preceding vowel before unpronounced "m" or "n". sam refers to origin, birth or dependent origination; sambodhi, sambhava. Graha (Devanagari: ग्रह) means 'seizing', 'laying hold of', 'holding'.

== History and dissemination ==
Tucci inaugurated scholarship in a western language on the Tattvasaṃgraha with his exploration on the Maheśvara subjugation myth it holds. Snellgrove continued to stake a foundation of western scholarship in both his publication of the facsimile reproduction of one of the extant Sanskrit manuscripts, a publication opened by a scholarly introduction and also his presentation of tantra in volume one of Indo-Tibetan Buddhism. Todaro has provided a translation of the first section of the tantra, accompanied by a study of the role of the Tattvasaṃgraha and associated texts in the tradition of Kūkai, founder of Japanese Shingon.
