= Tusor =

- Location within Borneo
- Coordinates: 1.41667°N 111.55°E
- Country: Malaysia
- State: Sarawak
- Elevation: 88 m (289 ft)

Tusor is a settlement in Sarawak, Malaysia. It lies approximately 136.6 kilometres (84.9 mi) east of the state capital Kuching. Neighbouring settlements include:

- Tanu 1.9 kilometres (1.2 mi) north
- Jangkar 1.9 kilometres (1.2 mi) north
- Empaong 1.9 kilometres (1.2 mi) west
- Bedanum 1.9 kilometres (1.2 mi) east
- Penurin 1.9 kilometres (1.2 mi) south
- Sekuyat 2.6 kilometres (1.6 mi) northeast
- Maja 2.6 kilometres (1.6 mi) southwest
