= Bedanum =

- Location within Borneo
- Coordinates: 1.41667°N 111.56667°E
- Country: Malaysia
- State: Sarawak
- Elevation: 99 m (325 ft)

Bedanum is a settlement in Sarawak, Malaysia. It is 138.5 km (86.1 mi) east of the state capital Kuching. Neighbouring settlements include:

- Kundong 1.9 km (1.2 mi) east
- Sekuyat 1.9 km (1.2 mi) north
- Tusor 1.9 km (1.2 mi) west
- Maja 1.9 km (1.2 mi) south
