= Sekuyat =

- Location within Borneo
- Coordinates: 1.43333°N 111.56667°E
- Country: Malaysia
- State: Sarawak
- Elevation: 93 m (305 ft)

Sekuyat is a settlement in Sarawak, Malaysia. It lies approximately 138.2 kilometres (85.9 mi) east of the state capital Kuching. Neighbouring settlements include:

- Tanu 1.9 kilometres (1.2 mi) west
- Jangkar 1.9 kilometres (1.2 mi) west
- Melayu 1.9 kilometres (1.2 mi) north
- Kundong 2.6 kilometres (1.6 mi) southeast
