= Semumoh =

- Location within Borneo
- Coordinates: 1.41667°N 111.51667°E
- Country: Malaysia
- State: Sarawak
- Elevation: 85 m (279 ft)

Semumoh is a settlement in Sarawak, Malaysia. It lies approximately 132.9 kilometres (82.6 mi) east of the state capital Kuching. Neighbouring settlements include:

- Pok 1.9 kilometres (1.2 mi) west
- Betong 1.9 kilometres (1.2 mi) south
- Serian 2.6 kilometres (1.6 mi) northwest
- Ban 2.6 kilometres (1.6 mi) southwest
- Tusor 3.7 kilometres (2.3 mi) east
