= Empaong =

- Location within Borneo
- Coordinates: 1.41667°N 111.53333°E
- Country: Malaysia
- State: Sarawak
- Elevation: 85 m (279 ft)

Empaong is a settlement in Sarawak, Malaysia. It lies approximately 134.8 kilometres (83.8 mi) east of the state capital Kuching. Neighbouring settlements include:

- Semumoh 1.9 kilometres (1.2 mi) west
- Tusor 1.9 kilometres (1.2 mi) east
- Salulap 2.6 kilometres (1.6 mi) northwest
- Tanu 2.6 kilometres (1.6 mi) northeast
- Jangkar 2.6 kilometres (1.6 mi) northeast
- Betong 2.6 kilometres (1.6 mi) southwest
- Penurin 2.6 kilometres (1.6 mi) southeast
