= Portraits of Seven Shingon Patriarchs =

Portrait of Kukai's predecessors, now in To-ji

Portrait of the Seven Shingon Patriarchs
- 絹本著色真言七祖像 (kenpon chakushoku shingon shichisozō) (Japanese)
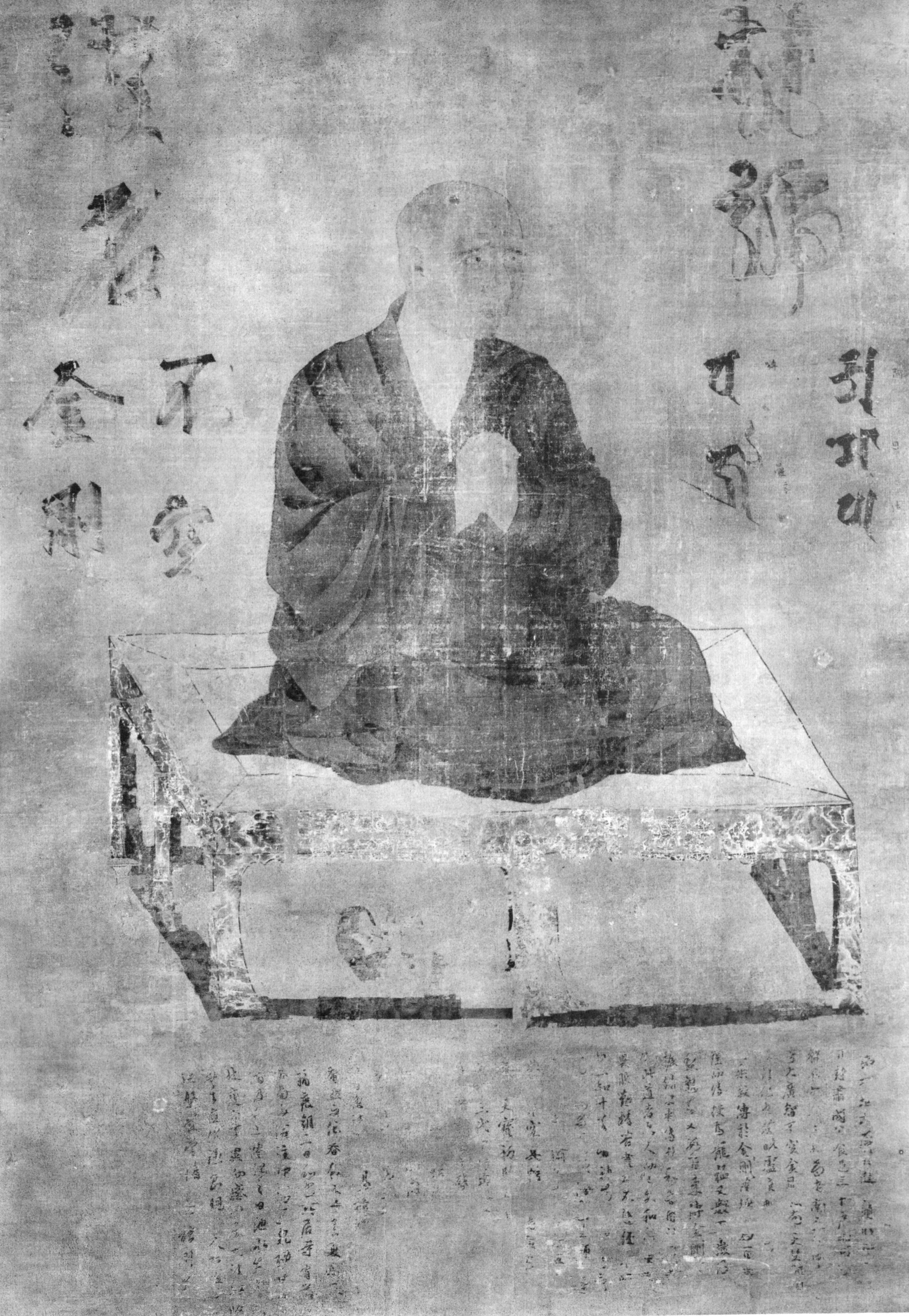
- Portrait of Amoghavajra
- Artists: Li Zhen, Kukai
- Year: 806, 821
- Movement: Butsuga
- Subject: Seven Masters of Shingon Buddhism
- Designation: National Treasure
- Location: Kyoto
- Owner: To-ji

The Portraits of Seven Shingon Patriarchs, (Japanese: 絹本著色真言七祖像; Romaji: kenpon chakushoku shingon shichisozō) is a set of Tang dynasty and Heian period hanging scrolls depicting the Masters of Chinese Esoteric Buddhism. Commissioned by Kūkai in 806 as the "Eighth Master" of Shingon Buddhism, after his abhisheka under his master Huiguo, and painted by the artist Li Zhen, they were made as part of Kukai's return to Japan, as he established the foundation of Shingon, and further dissemination of Buddhism. Currently housed in Tō-ji, Kyoto, it is classified as a National Treasure.

== History ==
From the year 804 to 806, Kūkai spent two years on a government sponsored delegation to China, in an effort to update Buddhist teachings in Japan. Studying at Ximing Temple, in Xi'an under Huiguo, he mastered the teachings of Esoteric Buddhism in what was expected to be 20 years in the matter of months. From 13 June 805 to 10 August 805, Kūkai completed his baptism, the abhisheka as the "Eighth Patriarch". As part of his return trip, his haul included treatises, sutras (including those translated by Amoghavajra which did not exist in Japan at the time), and the portraits of Five Patriarchs, painted by Tang Court painter Li Zhen.

The portraits made in 804 consist of Vajrabodhi, Śubhakarasiṃha, Amoghavajra, Yi Xing, and Huiguo. Years later in 821, to complete the depictions of all the Patriarchs, Kūkai completed the portraits of Nāgabodhi and Nagarjuna, to complete the lineage of the transmission of the Vairocanābhisaṃbodhi Sūtra.

=== Conservation and Modification ===
The portraits, in addition with paintings of Mandala of the Two Realms he brought from China saw extensive usage and wear. During the time the works were utilized at Jingo-ji, Kūkai lamented the state of the works:

The silk is damaged, and the colors are flaking [so much] that the faces of the deities have started to change. Students will express lament viewing [the paintings in this way] and it is a pity that [the damaged mandalas] will bring misfortune to all living beings. . . . Reverently, beginning in Kōnin 12 (821), fourth month, third day and until the end of the eighth month, I had the Mandala of the Womb of Great Compassion made up of eight widths of silk, the Diamond World Mandala made up of nine widths of silk . . . and portraits of Nāgārjuna and Nāgabodhi all newly painted.

- Vow of the Four Debts of Gratitude in the Making of the Mandalas of the Two Worlds” (Shion no ontame ni nibu no daimandara o tsukuru gammon 奉為四恩造二部大曼荼羅願文)

In a message to Fujiwara no Fuyutsugu, the Minister of the Left, Kūkai further described the deterioration of the portraits:

The fog atop the mountain [i.e. Mount Takao] is thick; the figures [of the patriarchs] are damaged and everything is covered with dust. I am afraid they are not adequate for imperial viewing. My request today is to ask for a specialist to immediately repair [the paintings]. I would be most grateful for this.

In 821, the portraits were restored, with the addition of the new Nāgabodhi and Nagarjuna portraits. Modifications were made, such as inscribing the names of the masters in Siddhaṃ script along with the names in Hanzi. In addition, Kūkai made additional modifications, by writing out the annotated biographies of the previous masters on the newly expanded edges of the painting, utilizing hihaku technique (writing hastily so that intact paper surface can be seen in the written characters).

With the paintings prepped for Imperial viewing, the names of Nāgabodhi and Nagarjuna were inscribed by Emperor Saga at Kūkai's bequest, as to symbolize the linkage of the Shingon transmission with the Imperial Family.

Currently housed at Tō-ji, the Agency for Cultural Affairs designated it as National Treasure in 29 March 1952.

== Gallery ==
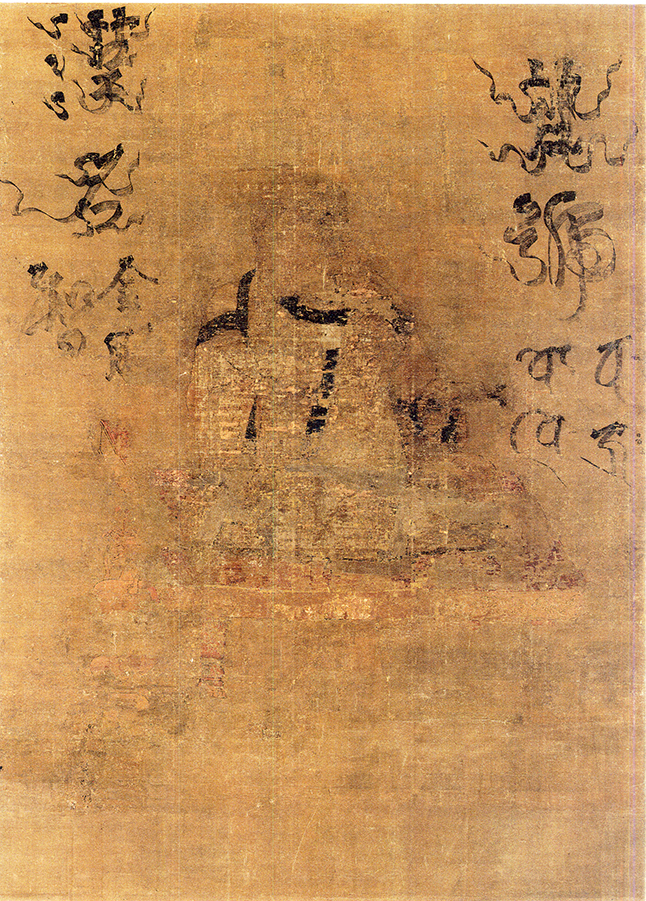
Vajrabodhi (805)

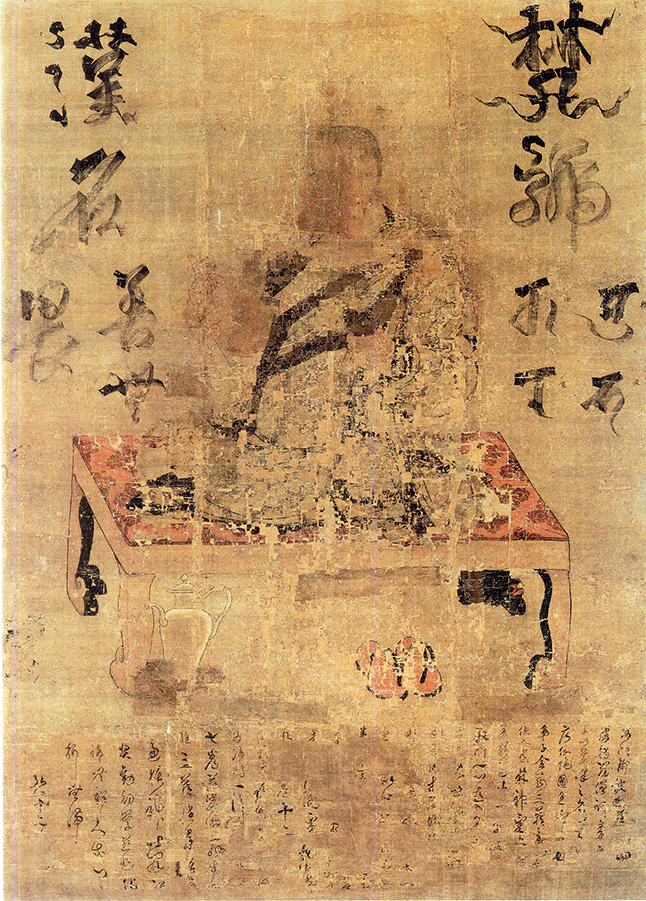
Śubhakarasiṃha (805)

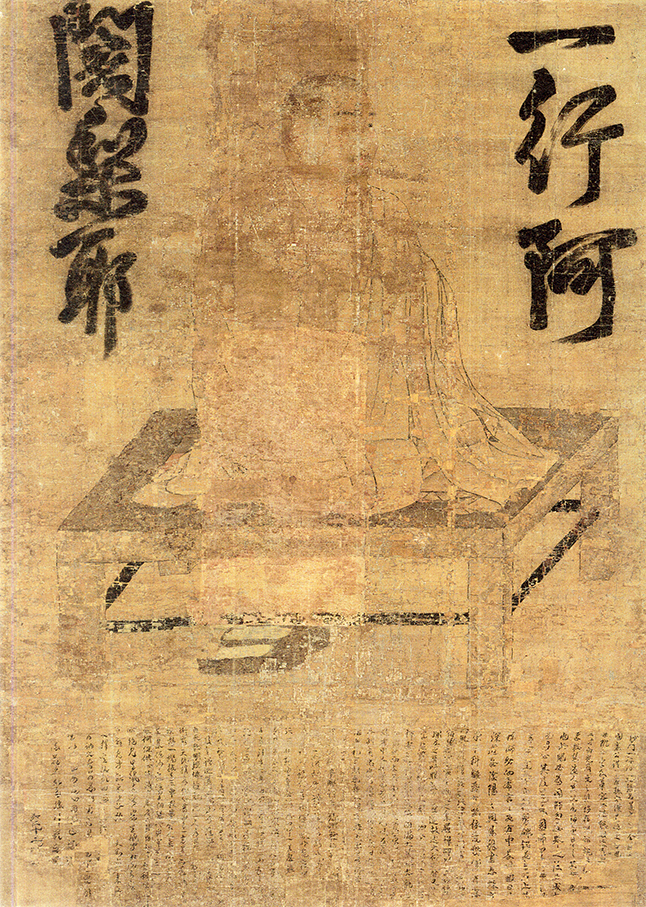
Yi Xing (805)

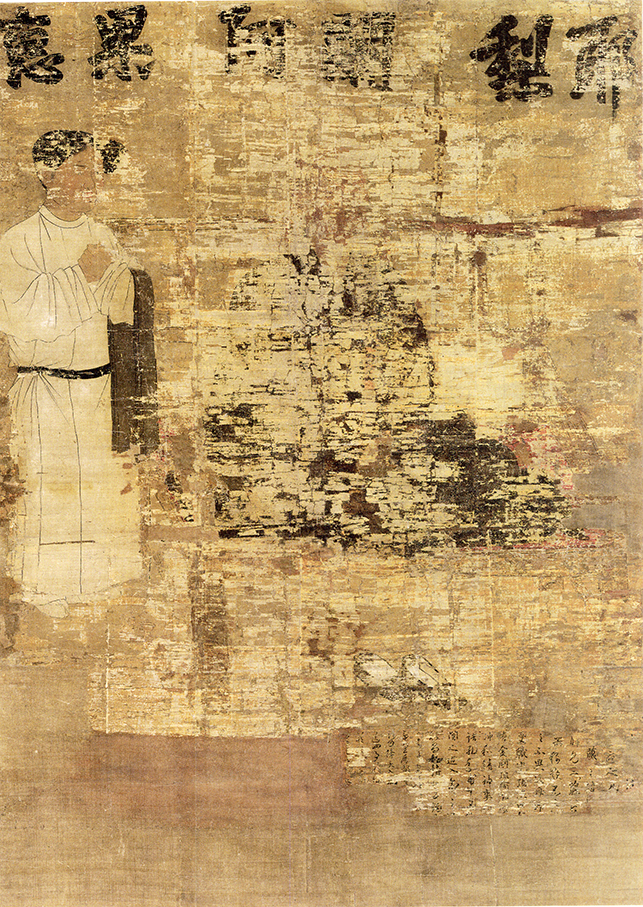
Huiguo (805)

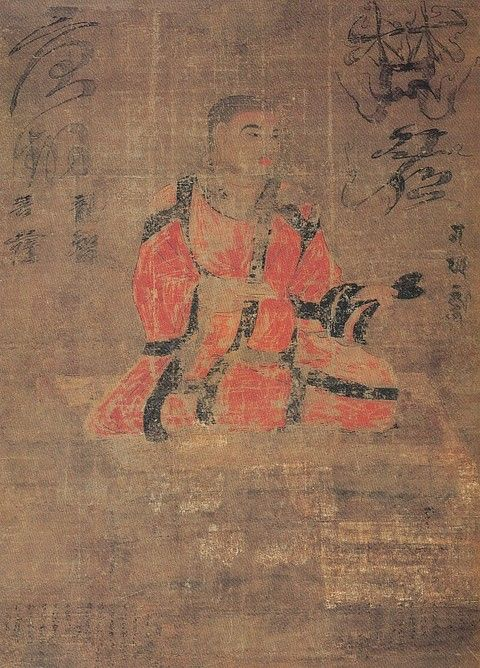
Nāgabodhi (821)

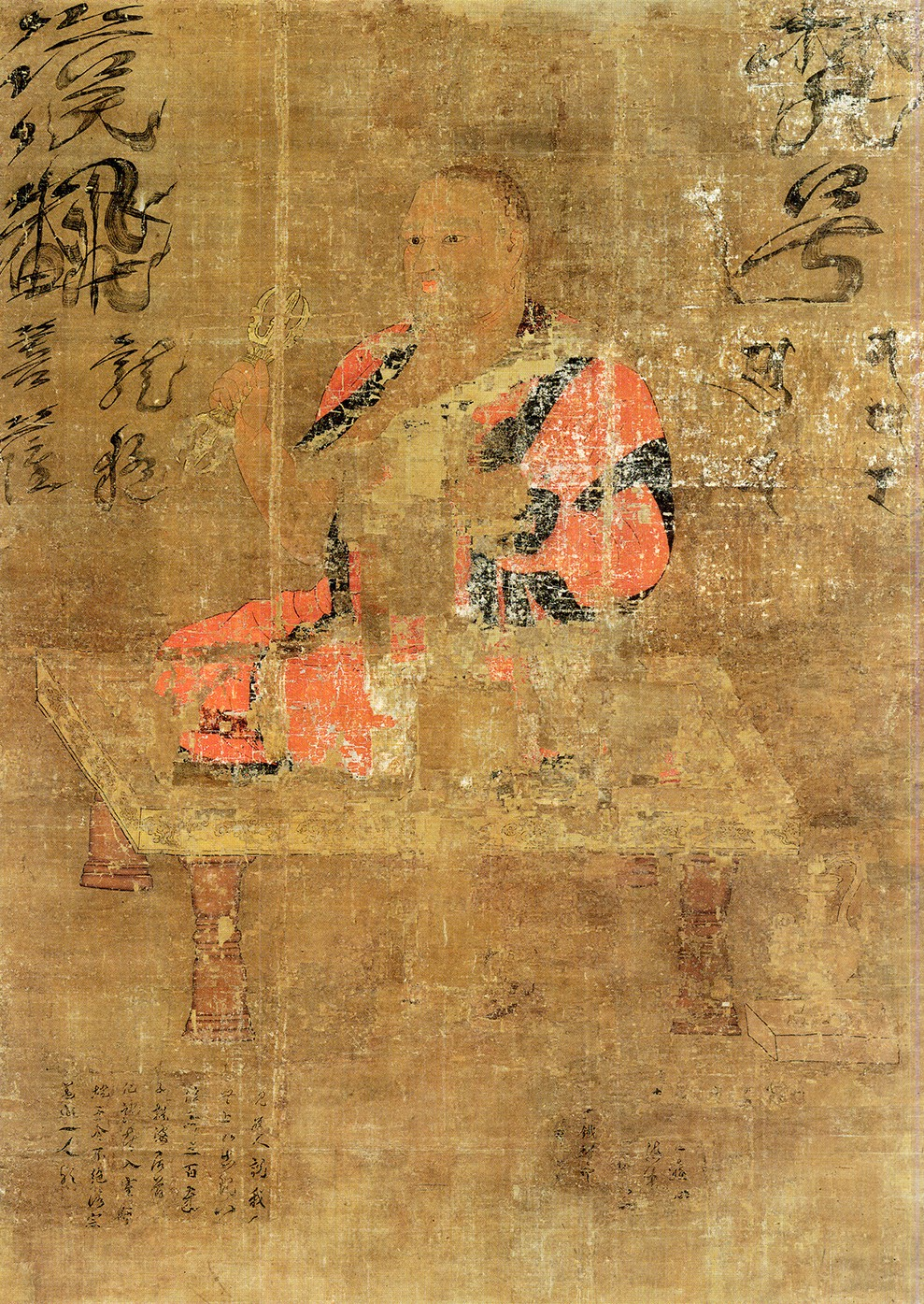
Nagarjuna (821)
