= Liyan (Buddhist monk) =

9th-century Buddhist monk; translator of Buddhist texts into Chinese

- Chinese: 利言
Transcriptions
Standard Mandarin
- Hanyu Pinyin: Lìyán

Lìyán (利言; fl. 726-788) was a Buddhist monk (沙門) from Kucha. According to the Biographies of eminent monks compiled during the Song period (T 2061, 50:804b17 ff.), he was originally from Kucha. He was ordained in 726, and is said to have mastered a wide range of Buddhist texts and the Chinese classics. He acted an amanuensis to the Indian Buddhist monk Dharmacandra (Fǎyuè 法月; 653–743 CE) when he translated Pǔbiànzhìcáng bōrěbōluómìduō xīnjīng (普遍智藏般若波羅蜜多心經; T 252), a version of the Prajñāpāramitā-hṛdaya-sūtra in 738 CE (T 2157; 55.748c05).

Lìyán was also amanuensis to Kashmiri monk Prajñā during his translation of Bōrěbōluómìduō xīnjīng (般若波羅蜜多心經; T 253) a version of the Prajñāpāramitā-hṛdaya-sūtra in 788 CE. He was also involved in making Chinese translations of the Mahāyāna Six Paramitas Sūtra (Dàshèng lǐqù liùbōluómìduō jīng 大乘理趣六波羅蜜多經; T 261). However, note that Japanese Scholar, Tsukinowa Kenryū, believes that Prajñā composed rather than translated his works

Lìyán own works include a Chinese-Sanskrit dictionary for ritual practice, Fànyǔ zámíng (梵語雜名; T 2135)

Liyan's translation activities were carried out that the Hànlín (翰林) Translation Academy at Guāngzhái Monastery (光宅寺) (T 2061, 50: 716b17-8).

== See also ==
- Chinese Buddhism

== Bibliography ==
- Sòng gāosēng zhuàn jìn gāosēng chuán biǎo 《宋高僧傳 進高僧傳表》 “Biographies of eminent monks compiled during the Song period” (T 2061).
- Tsukinowa Kenryū 月輪 賢隆. 1956. “Hannya sanzō no hon’yaku ni taisuru higi 般若三蔵の翻經に対する批議.” Indo-gaku Bukkyō-gaku Kenkyū 4(2): 434-443.
- Yuánzhào 圓照. 794. 《大唐貞元續開元釋教錄》 Dà táng zhēnyuán xù kāiyuán shìjiào lù. Newly Authorized Catalog of Shakyamuni’s Teachings of the Zhenyuan Era. [aka Zhēnyuán Catalogue].(T 2156).
- Yuánzhào 圓照. 800 《貞元新定釋教目錄 》 Zhēnyuán xīndìng shìjiào mù lù Zhenyuan. Revised List of Canonical Buddhist Texts of the Zhenyuan Era. (T 2157)
