= Qinglong Temple (Xi'an) =

Building in Shaanxi, China

- 青龙寺
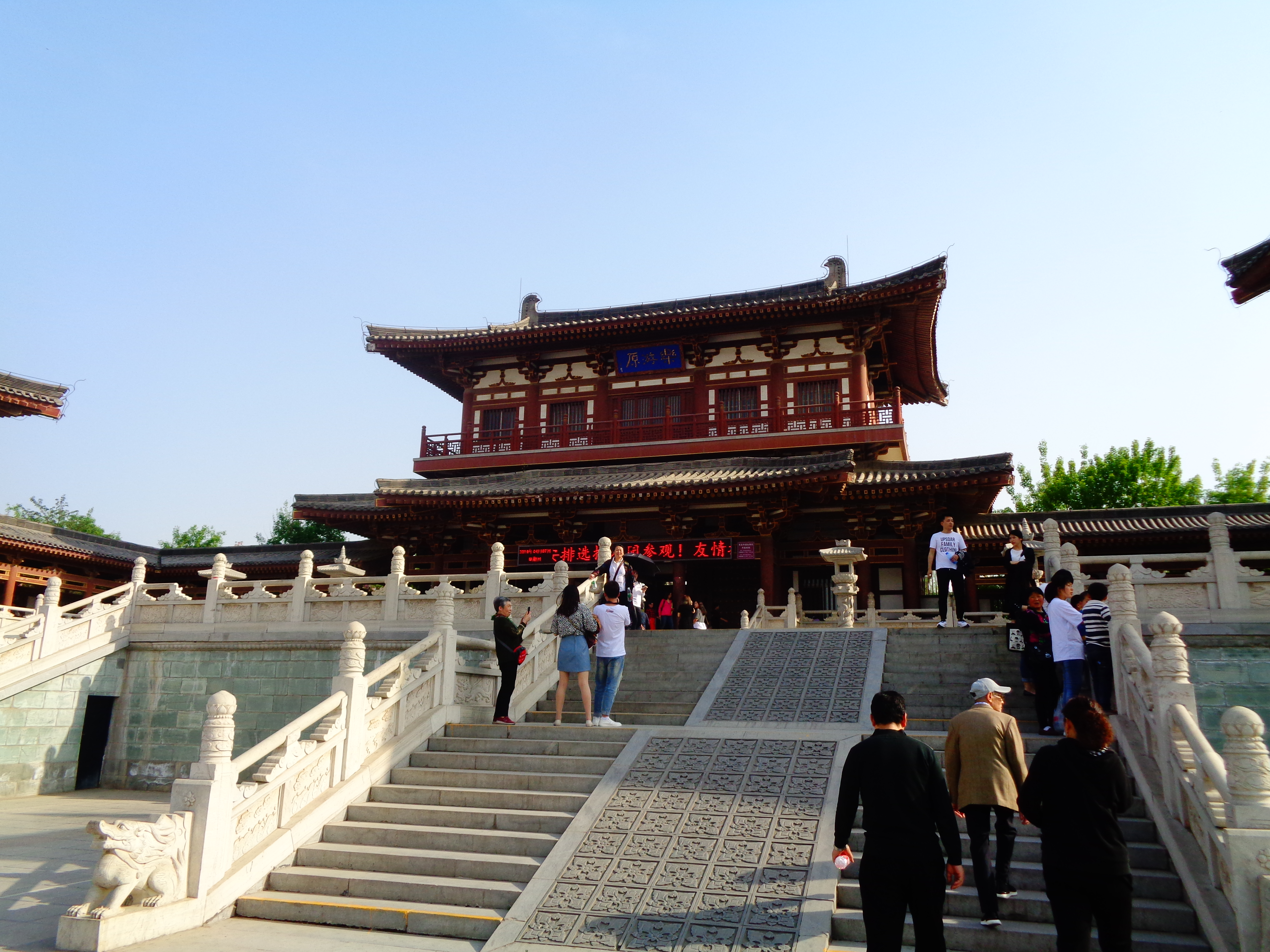

- Location within China

Religion
- Affiliation: Chinese Esoteric Buddhism (Mizong)

Location
- Location: Xi'an, Shaanxi
- Country: China
- Coordinates: 34°14′10″N 108°59′04″E

Architecture
- Style: Chinese architecture
- Established: 582
- Completed: 1980s (reconstruction)

Qinglong Temple (simplified Chinese: 青龙寺; traditional Chinese: 青龍寺; pinyin: Qīnglóng Sì; lit. 'Green Dragon Temple'), also known as Shifo Temple (Chinese: 石佛寺; pinyin: Shífó Sì; lit. 'Temple of Stone Buddha'), is a Buddhist temple located in Xi'an, Shaanxi, China. In the mid-Tang dynasty (618–907), Huiguo taught Vajrayana at the temple, his Japanese disciple Kūkai introduced it to Japan, since then, Qinglong Temple became the cradle of Vajrayana of both Chinese and Japanese Buddhism. Qinglong Temple was completely damaged in 1086 during the Northern Song dynasty (960–1127) and gradually it became unknown to public, the nascent version was completed in the 1980s with Tang dynasty architectural style.

== History ==
=== Sui dynasty ===
Qinglong Temple traces its origins to the former Linggan Temple (灵感寺), which was established in 582, at the dawn of Sui dynasty (581–618).

=== Tang dynasty ===
In 662, namely the 2nd year of Longshuo period of Emperor Gaozong of Tang dynasty (618–907), Princess Chengyang was sick, monk Falang (法朗) prayed to Buddha to bless the princess. When she recovered from her illness, she established the Guanyin Temple (观音寺), which was renamed "Qinglong Temple" in 711 during the reign of Emperor Ruizong.

In the early 8th century, Vajrayana master Huiguo served as abbot and taught in the temple including many foreign monks, such as Japanese monks Kūkai, Ennin and Enchin, Korean monks Huiri (惠日) and Wuzhen (悟真) and Indonesian monk Bianhong (辩弘). Especially the Japanese monk Kūkai, who brought back his Buddhist teachings to Japan in the year 806 and his influence was part of what made Buddhism popular in Japan.

Since Emperor Wuzong believed in Taoism, in 845, he ordered to demolish Buddhist temples, confiscate temple lands and force monks to return to secular life. He presided over the destruction of tens of thousands of temples, and Qinglong Temple was abolished. One year later, it was renamed "Huguo Temple" (护国寺). In 855, in the Dazhong era of the reign of Emperor Xuanzong, the temple restored the original name.

=== Northern Song dynasty ===
In 1086, in the reign of Emperor Zhezong in the Northern Song dynasty (960–1127), Qinglong Temple was completely destroyed. It was gradually forgotten by people.

=== People's Republic of China ===
In 1963, the archaeological team found the site of Qinglong Temple. Soon afterwards, the local government started to rebuild Qinglong Temple on the original site.

In 1982, the governments of Xi'an, Kagawa Prefecture, Tokushima Prefecture, Kōchi Prefecture and Ehime Prefecture built the Monument of Kūkai together. Two years later, Memorial Halls of Huiguo and Kūkai were added to the temple. In 1986, Qinglong Temple introduced more than 600 sakura trees from Japan.

In 1996, Qinglong Temple was designated as a "Major National Historical and Cultural Site in Shaanxi" by the State Council of China. In 1997, Qinglong Temple reactivated its religious activities.
