= Emon Saburō =

Legendary figure of early ninth-century Japan

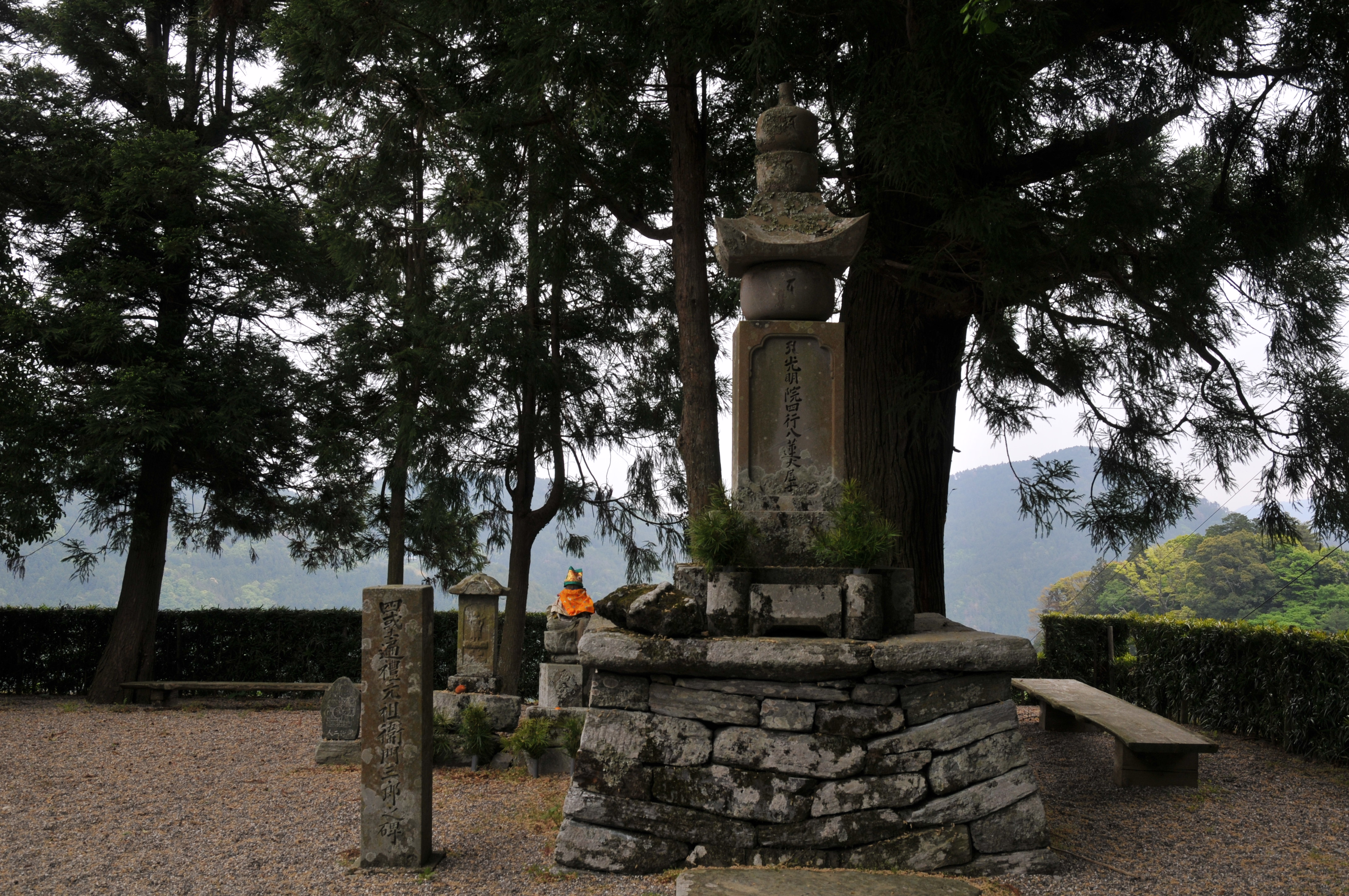
Monument to Emon Saburō at Joshin-an

Emon Saburō (衛門三郎) is a legendary figure of early ninth-century Japan associated with Kūkai and the Shikoku 88 temple pilgrimage.

== Legend ==
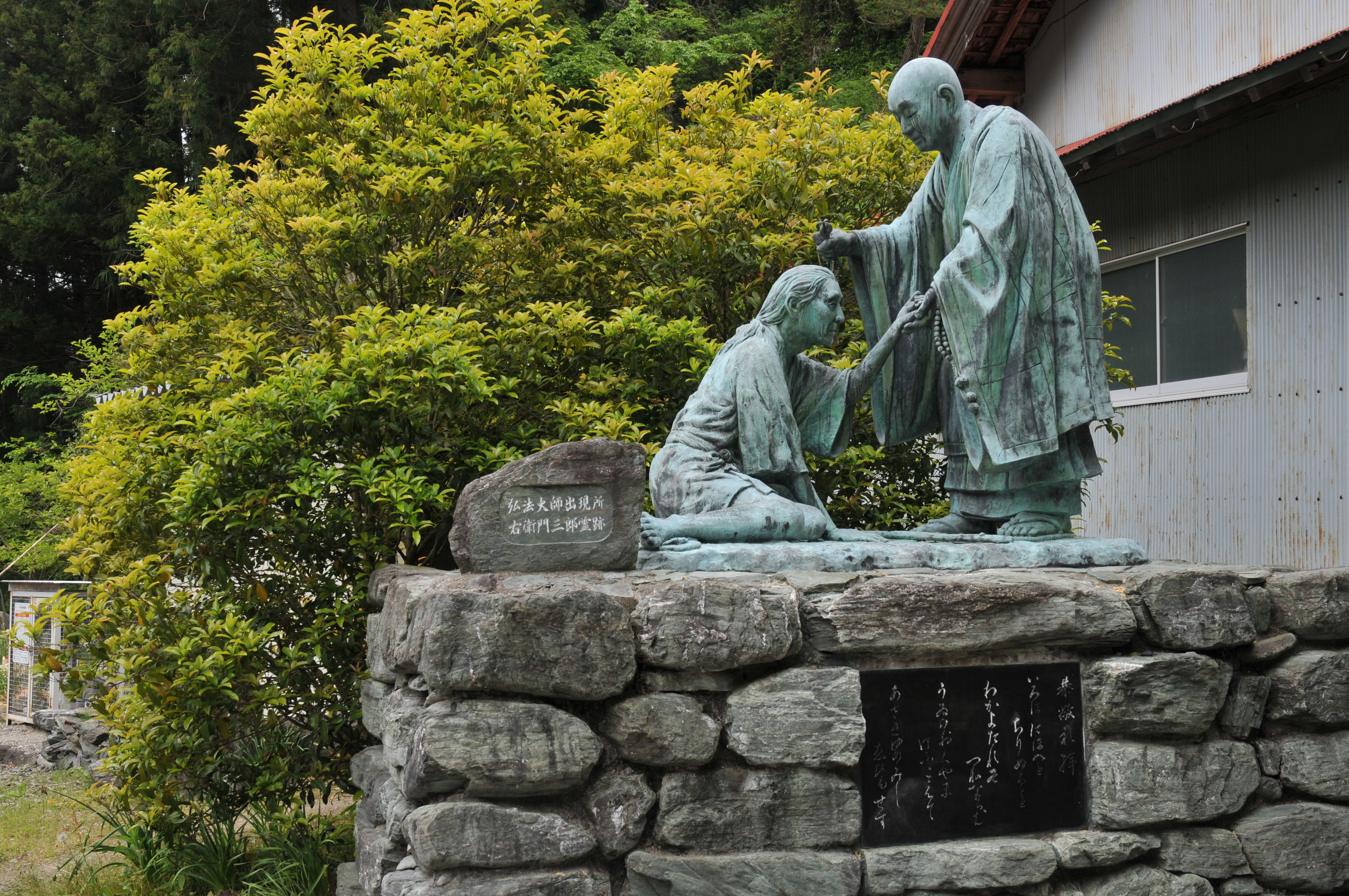
Statue of Kūkai meeting Emon Saburō in Kamiyama, Tokushima

A mendicant visited the house of Emon Saburō, richest man in Shikoku, seeking alms. Emon refused, broke the pilgrim's begging bowl, and chased him away. After his eight sons fell ill and died, Emon realized that Kūkai was the affronted pilgrim and set out to seek his forgiveness. Having travelled round the island twenty times clockwise in vain, he undertook the route in reverse. Finally he collapsed exhausted and on his deathbed Kūkai appeared to grant absolution. Emon requested that he be reborn into a wealthy family in Matsuyama so that he might restore a neglected temple. Dying, he clasped a stone. Shortly afterwards a baby was born with his hand grasped tightly around a stone inscribed "Emon Saburō is reborn." When the baby grew up, he used his wealth to restore the Ishite-ji (石手寺) or "stone-hand temple", in which there is an inscription of 1567 recounting the tale.

== Monuments ==
Emon Saburo's grave is beside the path between Temple 11 and Temple 12, at the spot where he fell. Near Temple 46 there are eight burial mounds, which can still be seen today, said to contain the remains of his eight sons. At Ishite-ji there is a casket containing the eponymous stone.

== Interpretation ==
The legend supports a number of practices of the Shikoku pilgrimage: it encourages the custom of osettai or alms; suggests wealth should be spent endowing temples; gives an origin for the practice of reverse circuits of the island; and promises absolution for pilgrims.

== See also ==
- Kūkai
- Shikoku 88 temple pilgrimage
- Ishite-ji
- Aetiology
