= Ximing Temple =

Buddhist temple in Xi'an, China

Ximing Temple (Chinese: 西明寺; pinyin: Xīmíngsì; Wade–Giles: Hsi-ming-ssu) was a famous temple in Chang'an (now known as Xi'an), the capital of the Tang dynasty. Chang'an was the eastern terminus of the Silk Road, and a cosmopolitan metropolis. Ximing was established by Tang Gaozong in 656. The temple is named after a Korean Buddhist monk known as Ximing Fashi (西明法师). Also known as Woncheuk (613–696) (Chinese Yuáncè), he did most of his important scholarly work at this temple.

It was at Ximing that pilgrim and traveller Xuanzang (602–664) translated the scriptures he had brought back from India. Another traveller Yijing (635–713) also based himself at Ximing while working on translations of Indian scriptures. Shubhākarasimha, an Indian scholar monk, was responsible for the introduction of the Mahavairocana Sutra and the tantric traditions associated with it. Kukai, a Japanese monk, studied Sanskrit there under the tutelage of Gandharan pandit Prajñā (734-810?) who had been educated at the Indian Buddhist university at Nalanda. Ximing was celebrated for its library which was the most comprehensive library of Buddhist texts in China at the time.
