= Fujiwara no Kadanomaro =

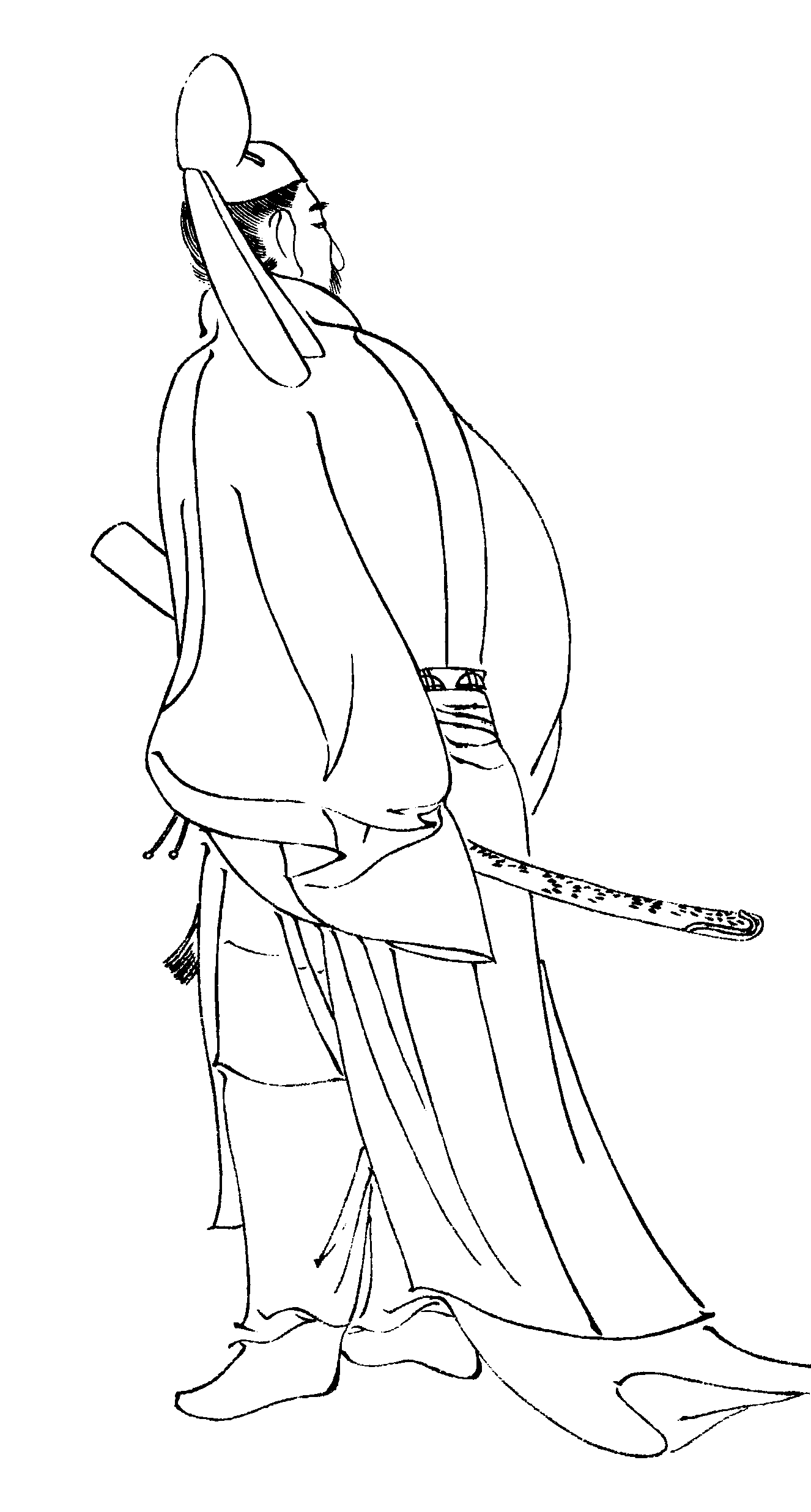
19th century depiction of Fujiwara no Kadanomaro by Kikuchi Yōsai

Fujiwara no Kadanomaro (藤原葛野麻呂) was a 9th century Japanese ambassador to Tang dynasty China. He was the son of Fujiwara no Oguromaro.

== Mission to China ==
In 803, the Emperor Kanmu ordered an expedition to China, led by Kadanomaro. During the Heian period, emperors usually sent envoys to China soon after their accession; this had been delayed in Kanmu's case because of the relocation of the capital. The mission left in May, but severe storms damaged the ships and forced a return to Japan, after spending some time in Dazaifu, Fukuoka. In June the next year, the mission, consisting of four ships, was sent out again.

Kadanomaro with three vice-secretaries (Ishikawa Michimasa, Tachibana Hayanari, and the young Kūkai) travelled on one vessel; Saichō, Yoshitada (Saichō's translator), and Sugawara no Kiyotomo were on another. The expedition was split up en route, with Kadanomaro's ship arriving in Fujian after thirty-four days, rather than the intended Yangtze River Delta. The local people were initially opposed to allowing the mission to make landfall, as they did not understand the purpose of the expedition. After Kūkai presented them with a document, written in Chinese, detailing the nature of the mission, the Japanese were allowed ashore. They were subsequently escorted to Chang'an.

They arrived at the court in early 805, but Emperor Dezong of Tang, the ruler, died shortly afterwards. The mission then returned to Japan via Tsushima Island. Kadanomaro then submitted a report on the uprisings and internal instability in China to Kanmu.

== Bibliography ==
- Sansom, George (1958). A History of Japan to 1334. Stanford University Press. ISBN 978-0804705233.
- Bohner, Alfred (2011). Moreton, David C. (ed.). Two on a Pilgrimage. Books on Demand. p. 48. ISBN 9783867417556.

== See also ==
- Japanese missions to Tang China
