= Ishite-ji =

Buddhist temple in Ehime Prefecture, Japan

Coordinates: 33°50′52.3″N 132°47′47.3″E

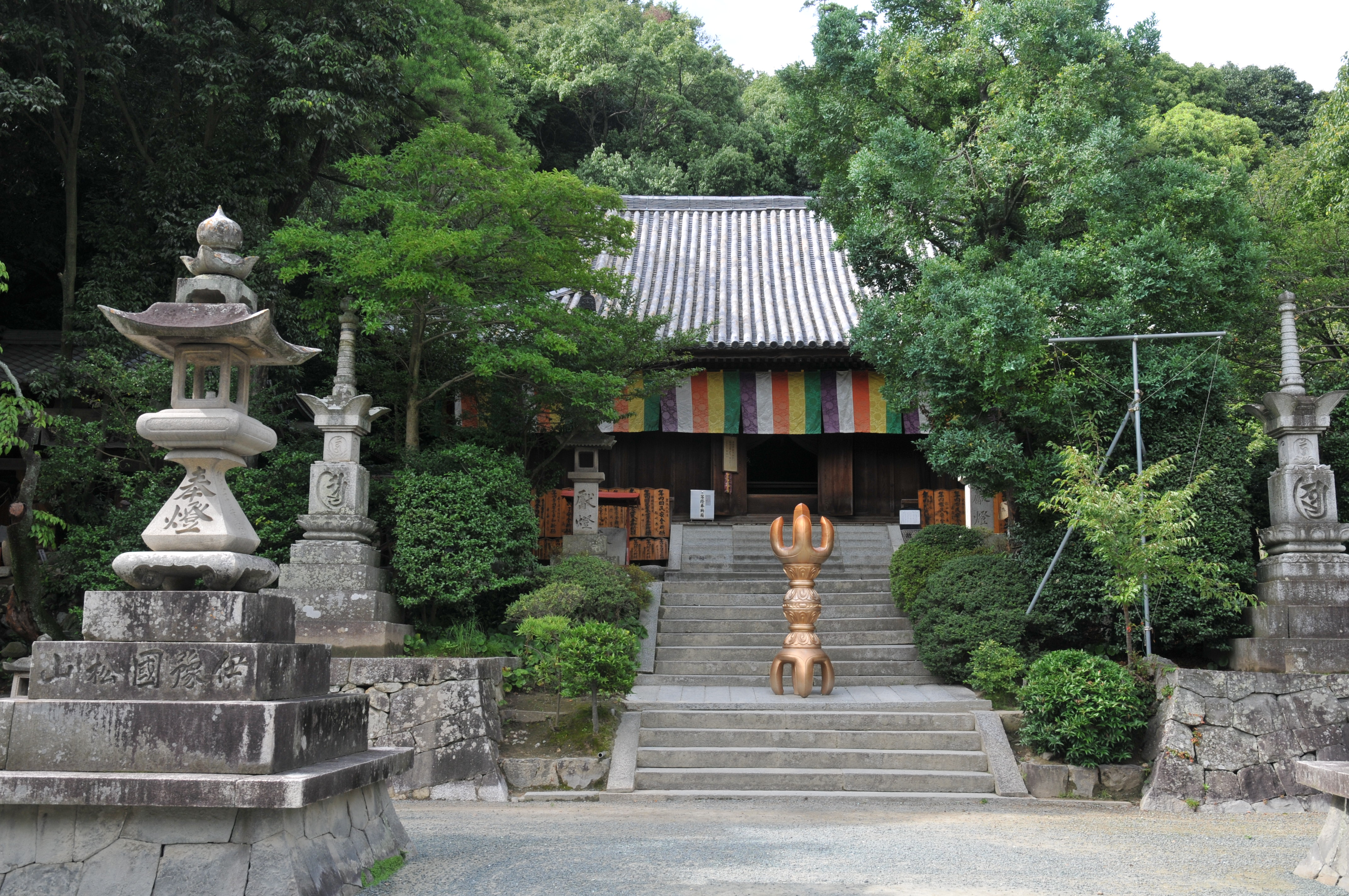
Ishite-ji Hondō (late Kamakura period); an Important Cultural Property

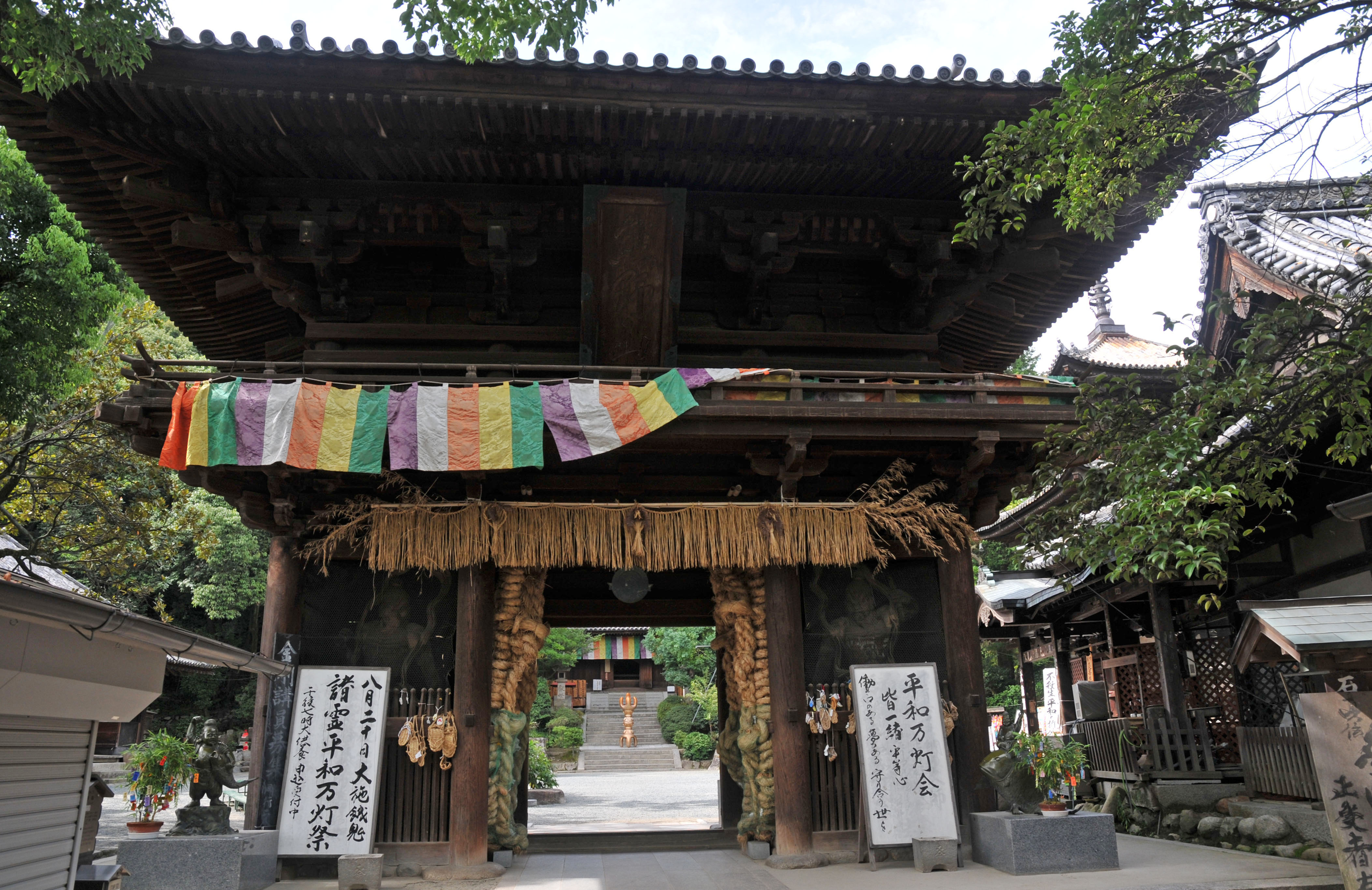
Ishite-ji Niōmon (1318); a National Treasure

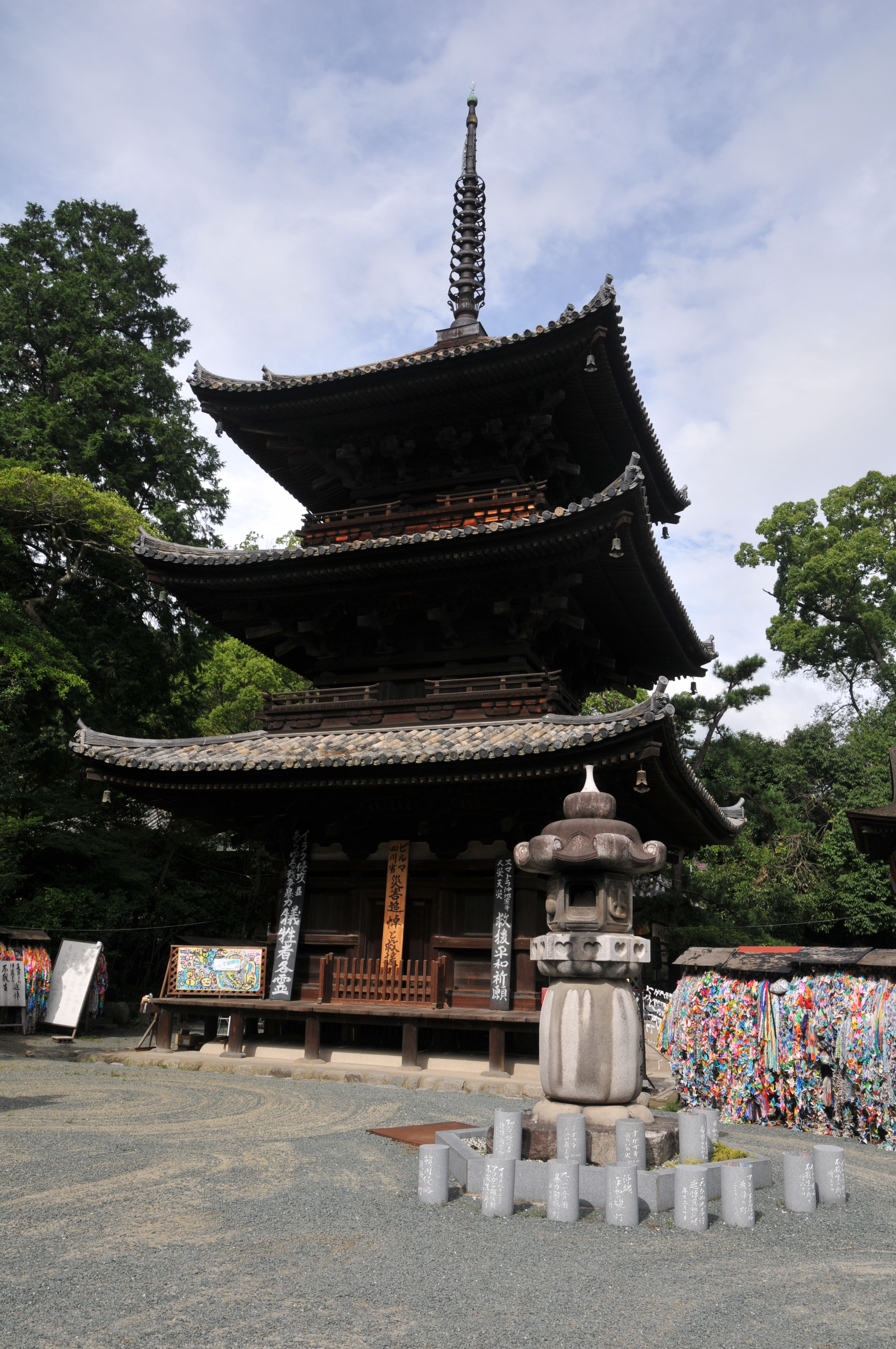
Ishite-ji three-storey pagoda and gorintō, both from the end of the Kamakura Period and Important Cultural Properties

Ishite-ji (石手寺) is a Shingon temple in Matsuyama, Ehime Prefecture, Japan. It is Temple 51 on the Shikoku 88 temple pilgrimage. Its name means Stone Hand Temple (石手寺). Seven of its structures have been designated National Treasures or Important Cultural Properties.

== History ==
The temple of Annoyō-ji was founded by Gyōki, and converted from a Hossō to a Shingon temple by Kūkai. Rebuilt by the ruler of Iyo Province in the eighth century, many of the temple buildings were destroyed by the Chōsokabe in the sixteenth century. The aetiology sees the temple's name changed to Ishite-ji or stone-hand temple after the tightly-clenched hand of the newborn son of the lord of Iyo Province was opened by a priest from the Annoyō-ji to reveal a stone inscribed "Emon Saburō is reborn".

== Buildings ==
- Niōmon (二王門) (1318) (National Treasure)
- Three-storey pagoda (三重塔) (late Kamakura period) (Important Cultural Property)
- Hondō (本堂) (late Kamakura period) (ICP)
- Kariteimotendō (訶梨帝母天堂) (late Kamakura period) (ICP)
- Shōrō (鐘楼) (1333) (ICP)
- Gomadō (護摩堂) (Nanboku-chō period) (ICP)

== Treasures ==
- Gorintō (五輪塔) (late Kamakura Period) (Important Cultural Property)
- Bronze bell (銅鐘) (1251) (ICP)
- Inscription of 1567 telling the legend of Emon Saburō
- Casket housing the eponymous stone.

== See also ==
- Shikoku 88 temple pilgrimage
- Kūkai
- List of National Treasures of Japan (temples)
