= Huiguo =

Tang dynasty Buddhist monk

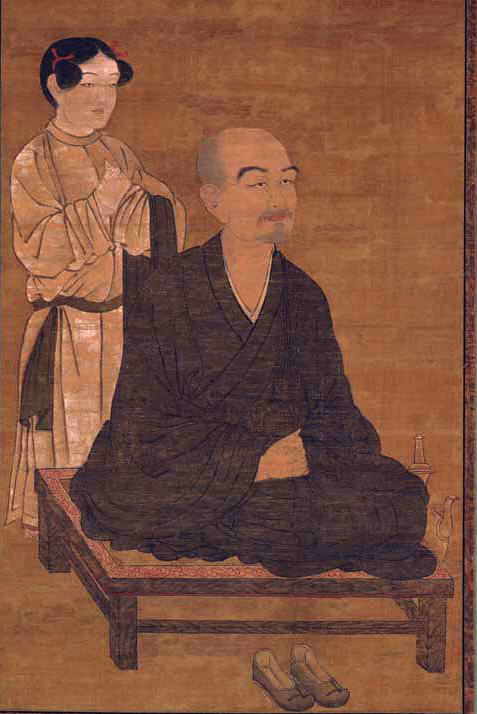
Painting of Huiguo with an attendant. Japan, Kamakura period (14th century).

Huiguo (Chinese: 惠果; pinyin: Huìguǒ; Wade–Giles: Hui-kuo) (746–805) was a Buddhist monk of Tang China who studied and taught Chinese Esoteric Buddhism, a Vajrayana tradition recently imported from India. Later Huiguo would become the teacher of Kūkai, founder of Shingon Buddhism, a prominent school of Buddhism in Japan.

== Biography ==
Huiguo was a monk at Qinglong Temple in Chang'an, the capital city of the Tang. He began his study of Buddhism as a śrāmaṇera at age 9 under a senior disciple of Amoghavajra, a monk of the tantric tradition, eventually becoming a direct disciple. By age 22 in 766 CE, Huiguo was ordained as a monk and extensively studied the Womb Realm and Diamond Realm mandalas before being fully initiated into Vajrayana that same year by Amoghavajra.

== Succession ==
In time, Huiguo's prominence attracted students from Korea, Central Asia and even Java, aside from his Chinese students.

Huiguo began an intensive training of Kūkai that ended when he died in 805 CE. After his death, the practices of the tantric tradition became absorbed to a large extent into the other Buddhist traditions in China. In Japan, the tradition was maintained as a separate sect, Shingon.
