= Prajñā (Buddhist monk) =

9th century Buddhist monk; translator of Buddhist texts into Chinese

Chinese name
- Chinese: 般若三藏
Transcriptions
Standard Mandarin
- Hanyu Pinyin: Bōrě Sānzàng

Also known as:
- Chinese: 般若
Transcriptions
Standard Mandarin
- Hanyu Pinyin: Bō Rě

Sanskrit name
- Sanskrit: प्रज्ञा

Prajñā (Chinese: 般若三藏 or 般若; pinyin: Bōrě Sānzàng or Bō Rě, 734), was a 9th-century Buddhist monk born in Kapisa, near modern Kabul, Afghanistan.

He visited Tang China and contributed several important retranslations of Sanskrit sutras into Chinese. Some of his main works are:

- The Avatamsaka Sutra (华严经; 華嚴經; Huá Yán Jīng)
- The Heart Sutra (大乘理趣六波罗密多经; 大乘理趣六波羅密多經; Dàshèng Lǐqù Liù Bōluómìduō Jīng or Dàchéng Lǐqù Liù Bōluómìduō Jīng)
- The Mahayana Sutra of Mind Meditation from the Jataka Tales (大乘本生心地观经; 大乘本生心地觀經; Dàshèng Běnshēng Xīndì Guānjīng or Dàchéng Běnshēng Xīndì Guānjīng)

Prajñā reportedly befriended the Japanese monk Kūkai, future founder of Shingon Buddhism, during his pilgrimage to China. He is said to have helped Kūkai learn and understand Sanskrit source texts. He also studied at the monastery of Nalanda in modern-day India.

According to the Zhenyuan Catalogue, Prajñā translated a work known as the Satparamita Sutra into Chinese with the help of the Christian monk Jingjing. This work does not survive.

== See also ==
- Silk Road transmission of Buddhism
