= Dōhan (monk) =

Japanese Shingon Buddhist monk

Dōhan (道範, 1179–1252) was a Japanese Buddhist monk and scholar of Kōyasan during the Kamakura period. He is primarily known for his systematic writings on Esoteric Buddhism (especially Shingon) and on the esoteric dimension of Pure Land Buddhism.

== Biography ==
Dōhan was born in Izumi no Kuni (east Osaka). When he was fourteen he became a monk at Mount Kōya (Kōyasan), the main center of Shingon Buddhism in Japan at the time, ordaining under Myōnin 明任 (1148–1229) at Shōchi-in Temple. Kōyasan was also a site for other groups of practitioners at the time, such as Pure Land hijiri (wandering ascetics) and the Jishū sect. Dōhan studied at various temples on Mount Kōya as well as at Daigo-ji, Zuishin-in, and Ninna-ji. He was a well rounded scholar of Shingon, as well as being knowledgeable in Tendai, Yogacara and Madhyamaka.

Dōhan seems to have associated with the monk Jikken 實賢 (1176–1249) of Daigo-ji, who had other students that also became teachers of esoteric Pure Land. Two other teachers of Dōhan, Kakkai of Keō-in and Jōhen of Zenrin-ji, were also known for their esoteric Pure Land teachings, particularly the teaching that this world is non-dual with the secretly adorned pure land (mitsugon jōdo 密嚴淨土) of Mahāvairocana.

Dōhan was a devotee of Amitābha Buddha, which was the primary object of devotion (honzon) in many of the temples that he trained in, including the Kōyasan temples of Shōchi-in, and Hōkō-in, as well as at Zenrinji and Ninna-ji. While he is sometimes seen as a syncretist for his Pure Land devotion, Proffitt points out that Pure Land Buddhism was already integral part of Shingon Buddhism and Kōyasan religious culture at the time. Dōhan was also deeply devoted to Kūkai, and his works contain the earliest recorded instance of the devotional invocation Namu Daishi Henjō Kongō 南無大師遍照金剛, which is now widely chanted in Shingon Buddhism.

== Thought ==
Dōhan was a prolific scholar who wrote in numerous genres, including "debate manuals, works on ritual praxis and doctrinal theory, commentaries, subcommentaries, sub-subcommentaries, and so on." Some of his most influential texts are works on devotion to Kūkai and the holy mountain Kōyasan as well as works explaining an esoteric understanding of simple practices like the nembutsu and the Mantra of Light.

One of his main works on the Shingon school of Kōyasan and Kūkai is the Nanzan hiku 南山秘口. This text presents Kōyasan as a kind of pure land on earth, or at least a conduit to the pure land. He presents the mountain as a place of spiritual power and associates it with the two mandalas of the Shingon tradition.

He also wrote various commentaries on Kūkai's writings, as well as others like the Dainichi kyōsho joanshō 大日經疏除暗鈔, a subcommentary on Yixing’s Commentary on the Mahāvairocana Sūtra, as well as the Bodaishinron dangiki 菩提心論談義記, a commentary on Amoghavajra’s Bodaishinron 菩提心論.

=== The Compendium on Esoteric Nenbutsu ===
Dōhan primary surviving work on esoteric nembutsu and Pure Land Buddhism is The Compendium on Esoteric Mindfulness of Buddha (Himitsu nenbutsu shō 祕密念佛抄), written in a question and answer style (mondō 問答). The text presents a doctrinal schema for understanding the increasingly popular Pure Land practice of nembutsu which had become ubiquitous in Dōhan's era which draws on Shingon esoteric teachings as well as on Tendai texts. The title of the work itself conveys the basic doctrine expounded in the text, an explanation of the himitsu (“secret,” “esoteric,” “inner,” “hidden,” “profound,” “mysterious”) meanings found within the classic Pure Land practice of nembutsu (buddhānusmṛti).

These secrets are outlined in the shijū hishaku 四重秘釋 (fourfold secret explanation), which provides four levels of understanding that can be applied to Amida Buddha, the Pure Land and the nembutsu. Each progressively deeper level can be summarized as follows:

- First level, the abbreviated or shallow meaning (senryaku shaku 淺略釋): This is the exoteric meaning which includes seeing Amitābha as the result body of the extensive bodhisattva path of Dharmākara Bodhisattva, and believing that anyone who says the name of Amida Buddha will achieve birth in the buddhafield of Sukhāvatī, which is a real place in the western quarter of the Buddhist multiverse.
- Second level, the deep secret (jinpi shaku 深祕釋): Amitābha is understood here as one aspect of the original Buddha Mahāvairocana and his dual world mandala. Apart from Mahāvairocana, Amida is the only other Buddha who appears in the central dais of both mandalas, indicating that he is an important aspect of the esoteric wisdom and compassion revealed in the mandalas of esoteric Buddhism, and is thus a manifestation of ultimate reality itself.
- Third level, the deep secret within the secret (hichū jinpi shaku 祕中深祕釋): This level expands on the previous view, and presents Amitābha as the compassionate activity of ultimate reality itself, which is ever-present, and all-pervasive. This is further explained through the name Amitāyus (Limitless Life), which is connected to all sentient beings in the universe, and is none other than the interpenetrated totality of all life in the cosmos. As Proffitt explains it, at this level, Amida is seen as "the boundless, eternally evolving vital force that, when correctly understood, is none other than the compassionate activity of the dharmakāya, within and all around sentient beings, awakening within beings and guiding them along the path."
- Fourth level, the deepest secret within the secret (hihichū jinpi shaku 祕祕中深祕釋): At this level, the cosmic all-pervasive Amitābha is revealed to be the true nature of all beings which active within their very bodies as the vital force in the physical heart (hṛdaya). This is further connected to physical processes in the human body, like breath, life force, speech, as well as to mind itself, and the ultimate bodhicitta.

Dōhan thus examines multiple perspectives on Amitābha Buddha, which are all valid ways of understanding the same reality. These include seeing Amitābha as the gate that leads to awakening and reveals all virtues, understanding Amitābha as an aspect of the cosmic Buddha Mahāvairocana, and seeing Amitābha as the essence of our own body-minds. Dōhan also presents Amida as the buddha of the "mystery of speech" (one of the 'three mysteries' in Shingon along with mind and body). He identifies this mystery with the "middle" truth and the middle way, and sees it as that which unifies the other two mysteries of body and mind, and the other two buddha bodies (nirmanakaya and dharmakaya).

Dōhan also draws further correspondences to other Buddhist teachings and Amida. For example, according to Proffitt: "The dharmakāya, mitsugon [Mahāvairocana's pure land], and Mahāvairocana correspond, respectively, to the saṃbhogakāya, Sukhāvatī, and Amitābha and to the nirmāṇakāya, samsara, and Śākyamuni." As such, Amitābha Buddha is Mahāvairocana. He is also the saṃbhogakāya which is the "middle" truth as taught in Tendai.

==== The secret of the nembutsu ====
While Dōhan's analysis often focuses on Amida centered nembutsu practice, he also uses the term in a more general sense to refer to Buddhānusmṛti, which can be directed towards any Buddha. Furthermore, throughout the Compendium on Esoteric Nenbutsu, he extends the meaning of the term to ultimately encompass all Buddhist practice.

Dōhan also provides an analysis of the nembutsu phrase "Namo Amida Butsu", as well as the mantras A-MI-TA and NAMO-A-MI-TA-BU (which is linked to various sets of five, such as the Five buddhas, five wisdoms, five hindrances, etc). Indeed, for him, the nembutsu is a proper mantra and he applies the style of Shingon mantra exegesis to it.

Just as he does with Amida Buddha, Dōhan provides four levels of meaning for the nembutsu:

1. The literal level which sees the nembutsu as a practice that takes you to the Pure Land after death through the Buddha's power
2. At the second level, the nembutsu is understood as a mantra which activates the mystery of speech which reveals the unity of Buddhas and sentient beings
3. At a deeper esoteric level, the nembutsu is the "breath of life" (ki) of all beings, the compassionate activity of ultimate reality.
4. At the deepest level, nembutsu is the ultimate principle that unifies Buddhas and sentient beings, the Pure Land and this world, samsara and nirvana.

In spite of this schematic sctructure, we should not assume that the literal or "shallow" level is something that is considered lesser or unimportant for Dōhan. Rather, Dōhan deconstructs the apparent hierarchy of this schema by pointing out that the simpler level of meaning is just as important as the "deeper" levels, writing:

For the mantra practitioner, it is precisely the shallow [understanding] that penetrates [and is not separate from] the most profound secret, and it is precisely the easy [practice] that immediately attains [and is not separate from] awakening.

Thus, the "shallow" and "easy" level of understanding actually contains within it all the deeper levels and is thus a fully self-contained path to awakening. As Proffitt explains, this means that "the shallow penetrates the most profound secret. The “easy” practice reveals the highest attainment." The basis of this claim is the non-duality of Buddhahood and sentient beings and the principle that “the part equals the whole.” As such, the simple nembutsu practice can reveal and open up the entire mandalic Buddhist universe, which is already present within the body-mind of all beings. Relying on the Amida-santai-setsu (explanation of the three truths through A-MI-TA), a Tendai hermeneutic method found in Jippan’s Byōchū shugyōki 病中修行記, Dōhan links the three characters in A-MI-TA as three syllables in a mantra, and associates them with the Tiantai threefold truth. He also associates these with the three Buddha families found in Shingon mandalas: Buddha (A), Vajra (MI), Lotus (TA), and draws numerous associations, for example:

A, as the Buddha division 佛部, signifies the eternal middle way. MI, as the vajra division 金剛部, signifies the ungraspable nature of self that, when transcended, leads to the knowledge that sentient beings and dharmas are inherently empty. TA, as the lotus division 蓮華部, signifies the ungraspable nature of purity, of true reality. Furthermore, A (Buddha), as ultimate reality, signifies the fundamental union of wisdom and principle. MI (Vajra) is the wisdom that is indestructible, like a vajra. TA (Lotus) is the principle (ultimate reality) that is the purity of one’s own nature. Again, A (Buddha) is the Buddha, signifying the unity of being (existence) and śūnyatā (emptiness/nothingness) as the middle way. MI (Vajra) is the wisdom that pervades being as śūnyatā itself, as the ele-ment of consciousness. TA (Lotus) is the principle that pervades being as the other five elements.

Dōhan further links the three syllables with the threefold buddha body, the three mysteries (body, speech, mind), three kinds of buddhafields, the three points (ultimate principle, wisdom and phenomena), three jewels, the three poisons, and other threefold Buddhist conceptual schemes. Dōhan further extends his interpretations towards metaphysical aspects such as seeing nembutsu as the breath of life itself, as that which makes life possible, which is also bodhicitta, and the activity of Mahāvairocana Buddha in the world. As Proffitt writes, "according to Dōhan, ultimately there is nothing that is not buddhānusmṛti."

Ultimately, for Dōhan, all Buddhist practice and human activity is grounded in the activity of the nembutsu (which is the very breath of all beings, the life force of all things). As Proffitt writes, "Because it is already the foundation of all practices, all activities, the himitsu nenbutsu is not limited to the consciously directed act of chanting the name." Through this non-dual view, Dōhan criticizes exclusive perspectives on nembutsu common in Japanese Pure Lands at the time which emphasized setting all other Buddhist practices aside in favor of nembutsu practice. For Dōhan, since all Buddhist practices are ultimately imbued with the power of the secret nembutsu, it makes no sense to say we should only practice the recitation of Namu Amida Butsu. Rather, practitioners should draw from the vast range of practices found in Mahayana and practice what their abilities and needs require. With this in mind, Dōhan outlines a diverse set of rituals and practices that can take any topic, Buddha or bodhisattva as an object of contemplation.

==== The Pure Land ====
Dōhan also explores Sukhāvatī as both a provisional distant paradise and an immanent reality present here and now. He presents Amida's Pure Land as being equivalent to Śākyamuni’s Pure Land in this world, as well as being the same as the Secret Solemnity Pure Land (Mitsugon Jōdo, Ghanavyūha), the universal Lotus Store World Vairocana Buddha, Tuṣita Heaven, and the Womb Realm mandala. He writes that due to their non-duality, it is ultimately pointless to argue about one of these destinations as being better or more desirable. Through this system of connections and equivalences, Dōhan is able to defend the numerous practices and soteriologies found in Japanese Buddhism at the time.

Dōhan examines the diverse traits attributed to Sukhāvatī in order to clarify how its various descriptions can coexist, explaining its association with the west by linking that direction with completion, compassion, and the symbolism of the heart-lotus, which opens at awakening. Dōhan, drawing on a text attributed to Ennin, argues that its apparent “distance” far in the west reflects the degree of one’s afflictions. As the mind is purified through cultivation, Sukhāvatī becomes experientially present, paralleling the Vimalakīrti Sūtra’s depiction of this very world as a pure buddha-field obscured only by delusion.

Also, according to Dōhan, Amida's pure land of Sukhāvatī is ultimately unlimited, since its name, signifying "ultimate bliss", points to the bliss of awakening, which is an all-pervasive power that is not limited to a specific location in the West. Furthermore, due to the non-duality of samsara and nirvana, the Pure Land is found within all living beings as their very heart-mind, the "heart-lotus" in the chest which contains all the virtues of Buddhahood (and is a common feature of esoteric visualization practices).

Dōhan discusses many more Pure Land topics and draws numerous associations with Mahayana and esoteric concepts. For example, he discusses the forty eight vows of Amida (connecting them with forty eight virtues), he discusses the sixteen contemplations of the Contemplation Sutra (associating them with the Shingon dual mandala), the coming greeting (raigo) experience and the twenty five bodhisattvas in the raigo retinue, the nature of Avalokiteśvara (which is none other than Amida), the nine levels of birth (and how they are ultimately all the same and non-dual). He also explains that while Rebirth in Sukhāvatī is often experienced in terms of a raigo experience (where the dying person sees Amida Buddha descending to greet them), these experiences are not separate from the one's own heart-mind and from the attainment of Buddhahood in this very body (sokushin jōbutsu). Thus, "going" to the Pure Land is also a "non-going". Birth is non-birth. "Here" and "there" are non-dual, two sides of the same reality. Likewise, self-power and other-power are also said by Dōhan to be ultimately one.

== List of works ==
Some of Dōhan's key works include:

- Nanzan hiku 南山秘口 - A brief text outlining Dōhan’s vision of Kōyasan as a conduit to the buddha-kṣetra and of Kūkai as a salvific figure embodying nondual esoteric principles.
- Kōbō Daishi ryaku joshō 弘法大師略頌鈔 - A commentary on Enmyō’s eighteen-verse biography of Kūkai, supplying textual sources and early medieval biographical and miraculous traditions.
- Jōōshō (also Teiōshō) 貞応抄 (T. 2447) - A doctrinal compendium produced in response to Dōjō of Ninnaji, addressing buddha-body theory, esoteric–exoteric correlations, enlightenment models, and the relation between raigō and sokushin jōbutsu.
- Yugikyō kuketsu 瑜祇經口決 - A record of orally transmitted teachings on the Yugikyō (T. 867), drawing on earlier Shingon authorities and emphasizing the nonduality of the first and final stages of the bodhisattva path.
- Dainichi kyōsho joanshō 大日經疏除暗鈔 - A subcommentary on Yixing’s Commentary on the Mahāvairocana Sūtra, focusing especially on esoteric explanations of the sutra’s title and incorporating teachings from Jōhen and Kakkai.
- Bodaishinron dangiki 菩提心論談義記 - A debate-style commentary on the Bodaishinron (T. 1665), analyzing bodhicitta, esoteric practice, and the “mystically adorned” buddha-kṣetra of Mahāvairocana.
- Rishushaku hidenshō 理趣釋祕傳鈔 - A subcommentary on Amoghavajra’s commentary to the Rishukyō, expounding nondual principle-wisdom-phenomena and composed near the end of Dōhan’s life at Dōjō’s request.
- Shakumakaenron ōkyōshō 釋摩訶衍論應教鈔 (T. 2288) - A surviving fragment of Dōhan’s commentary on Kūkai’s Shakumakaenron shiji, integrating the teachings of Kakkai and Jōhen and including reflections on Amitābha’s vows and the meaning of kimyō.
- Hizōhōyaku mondanshō 祕藏寶鑰問談鈔 - Lecture-note commentary on Kūkai’s Hizōhōyaku, systematizing the ten stages of mind and preserved as an authoritative Shingon scholastic gloss.
- Kongōchōgyō kaidai kanchū 金剛頂經開題勘註 - A commentary on Kūkai’s Kongōchōgyō kaidai, analyzing the esoteric meaning embedded in the title of the Vajraśekhara and emphasizing the “three-point” hermeneutic.
- Sokushin jōbutsugi kiki gaki 硏身成佛義聞書 - A three-fascicle collection comprising commentary and dialogues on the Sokushin jōbutsu gi, explaining nondual ontology and the realization of Buddhahood in this very body.
- Shōji jissōgi shō 聲字實相義鈔 - A commentary on Kūkai’s Shōji jissōgi, elaborating Shingon theories of language, semiotics, and the nonduality of signifier and signified.

== Further information ==
- Proffitt, Aaron P. Esoteric Pure Land Buddhism. University of Hawaiʻi Press, 2023.
