= Karchag Lhankarma =

Catalogue of Buddhist texts

The Karchag Lhankarma (Dkar chag lhan dkar ma) is a catalog of the Buddhist texts held at the Lhankar palace of the Tibetan Empire. It was probably compiled in 824 CE. It is the only one of the three catalogues of Buddhist texts from the imperial period that is preserved in the Kanjur. It is also the oldest known catalogue of these texts.
