= Kangyur =

Collection of sacred texts in Tibetan Buddhism

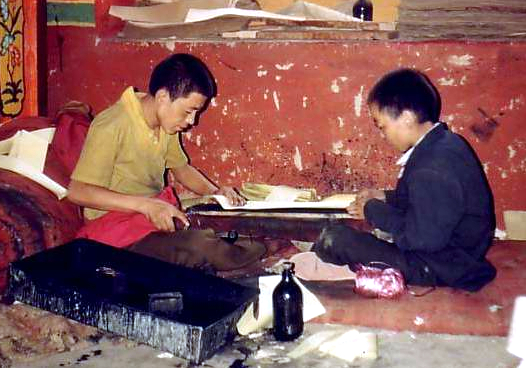
- Young monks printing scriptures in Sera Monastery, Tibet

Tibetan name
- Tibetan: བཀའ་འགྱུར།
Transcriptions
- Wylie: bka' 'gyur

The Tibetan Buddhist canon is a defined collection of sacred texts recognized by various schools of Tibetan Buddhism, comprising the Kangyur and the Tengyur. The Kangyur or Kanjur is Buddha's recorded teachings (or the 'Translation of the Word'), and the Tengyur or Tanjur is the commentaries by great masters on Buddha's teachings (or the 'Translation of Treatises').

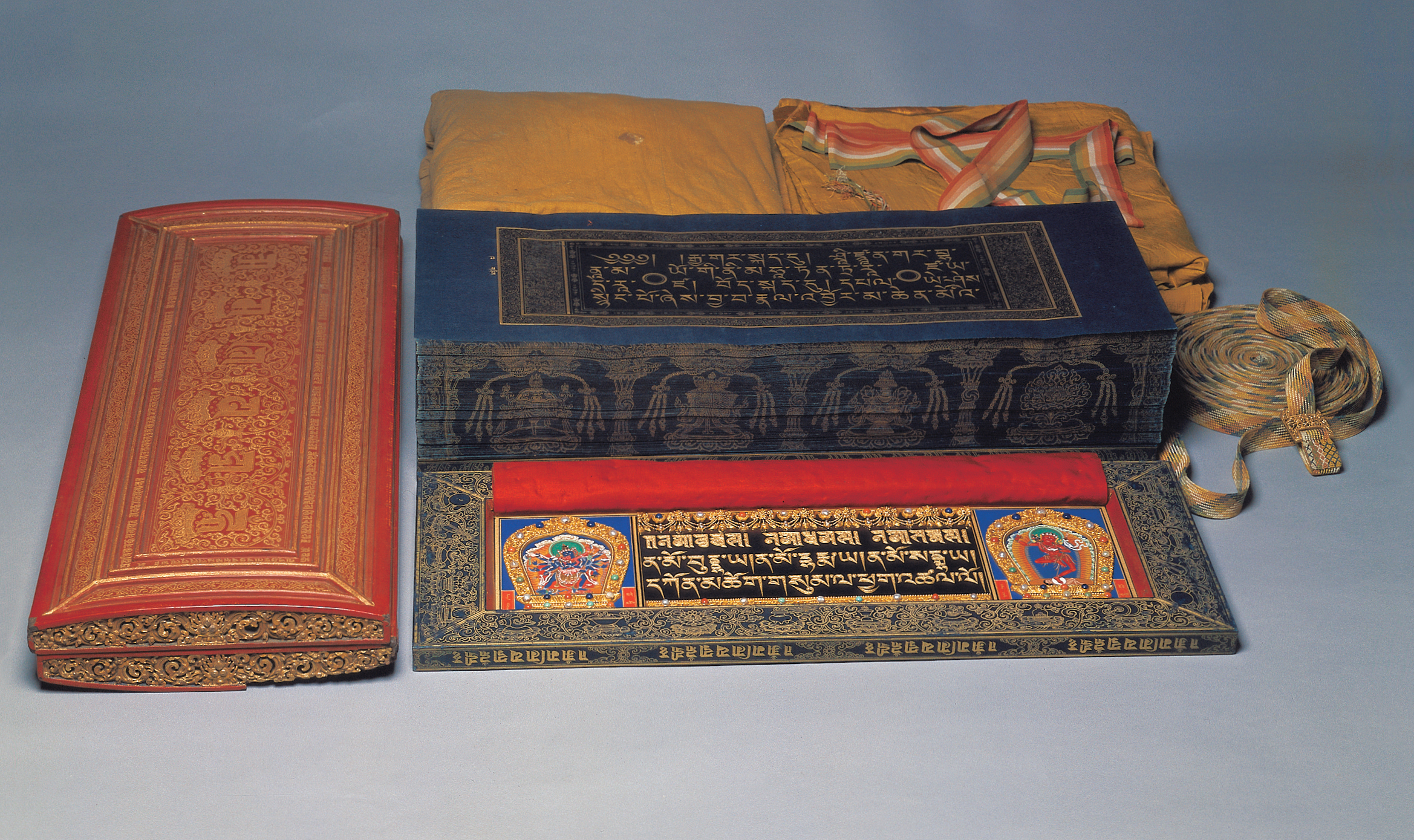
The so-called Kangxi Kangyur, completed in 1669, commissioned by Empress Dowager Xiaozhuang, grandmother of the emperor. National Palace Museum

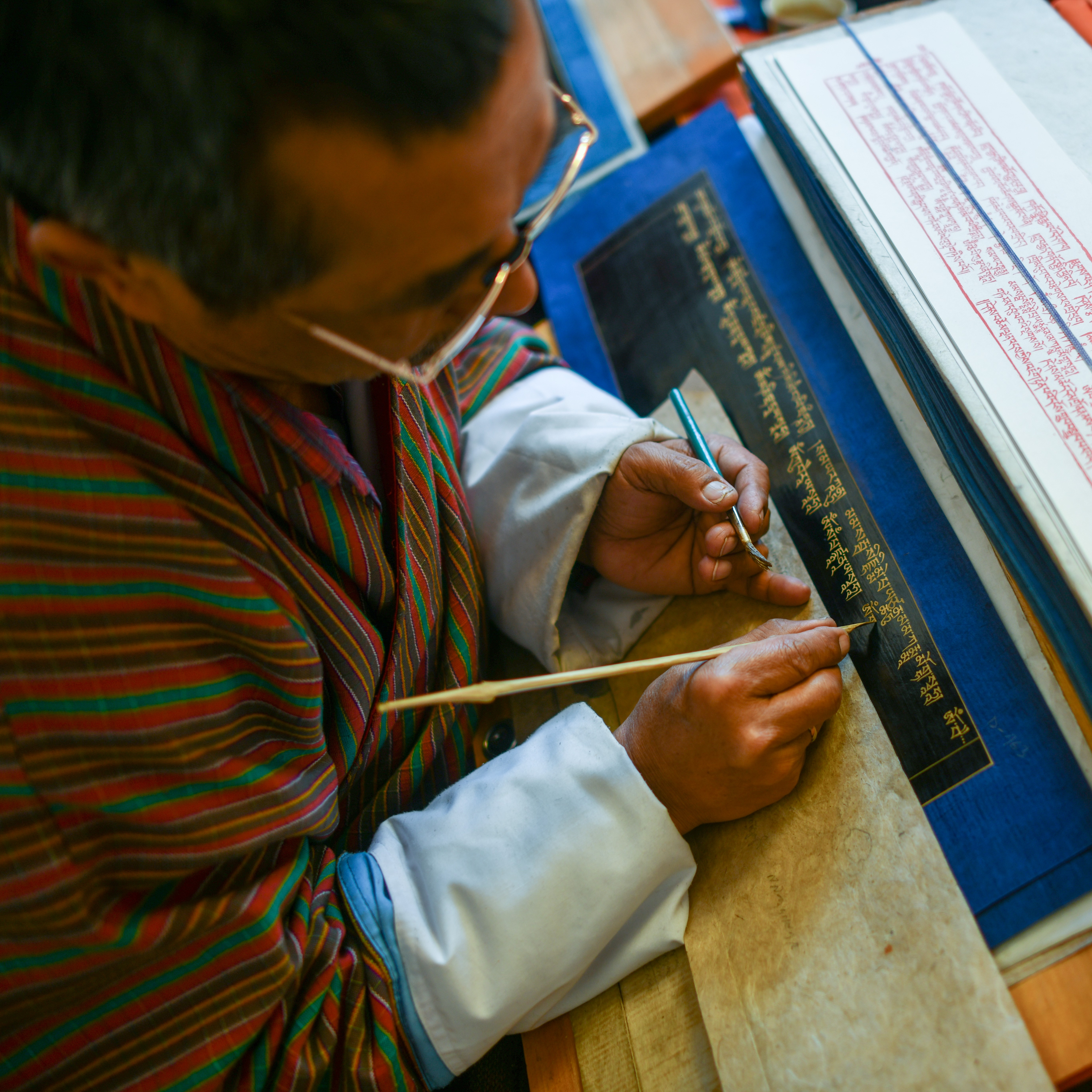
Calligrapher copying the Kangyur with gold ink, Thimphu (2021)

== Tibetan Buddhist canon ==
In addition to earlier foundational Buddhist texts from early Buddhist schools, mostly the Sarvastivada and Mahayana texts, the Tibetan canon includes Tantric texts. The last category is not always sharply distinguished from the others: the Tantra division sometimes includes material usually not thought of as Tantric in other traditions, such as the Heart Sutra and even versions of material found in the Pali Canon.

The Tibetans did not have a formally arranged Mahayana canon, and so devised their own scheme with two broad categories: the "Words of the Buddha" and later the commentaries; the Kangyur and Tengyur respectively. The Tengyur underwent a final compilation in the 14th century by Bu-ston (1290–1364). There is no proof that Bu-ston also took part in the collection and edition of the Tsal pa Kangyur, although he consecrated a copy of this Kangyur 1351 when he visited Tshal Gung-thang (Eimer 1992:178).

According to sakya mchog ldan (1428–1507), Bu-soon edited a Kanjur; however, it is not known which one. "The Kangyur usually takes up a hundred or a hundred and eight volumes, the Tengyur two hundred and twenty-five, and the two together contain 4,569 works."

- Kangyur or "Translated Words" consists of works in about 108 volumes supposed to have been spoken by the Buddha himself. All texts presumably once had a Sanskrit original, although in many cases the Tibetan text was translated from Chinese or some other language.
- Tengyur or "Translated Treatises" contains commentaries, treatises and abhidharma works (both Mahayana and non-Mahayana), in all, around 3,626 texts in 224 volumes.

The Kangyur is divided into sections on Vinaya, Perfection of Wisdom sutras, other sutras (75% Mahayana, 25% Hinayana), and tantras. It includes texts on the Vinaya, monastic discipline, metaphysics, and the tantras. Some describe the prajñāpāramitā philosophy, others extol the virtues of the various bodhisattvas, while others expound the Trikāya and the Ālaya-Vijñāna doctrines.

When the term Kangyur was first used is unknown. Collections of canonical Buddhist texts existed already in the time of Trisong Detsen, the sixth king of Tibet, who ruled from 755 until 797 CE, in Spiti.

The exact number of texts in the Kangyur is not fixed. Each editor takes responsibility for removing texts they consider spurious, and adding new translations. Currently there are about 12 available versions of the Kangyur. These include the Derge, Lhasa, Narthang, Cone, Peking, Urga, Phudrak, and Stog Palace versions, each named for the physical location where it was printed. In addition, some canonical texts have been found in Tabo Monastery and Dunhuang which provide earlier exemplars of texts found in the Kangyur. All extant Kangyur appear to stem from the Old Narthang Monastery Kangyur. The stemma of the Kangyur have been well researched, by Helmut Eimer in particular.

== Contents of the Kangyur ==
While each canon has a different organisation, the first complete catalogue of a Tibetan canon was the Tōhoku Catalogue based on the Derge Kangyur and Derge Tengyur, published in 1934. This is currently used as a standard for cataloguing and organising various print and digital editions of the Kangyur and takes the following structure:

1. Vinaya ('dul ba) — all derived from the Sanskrit Mūlasarvastivāda Vinaya.
  1. Vinayavastu (Tōh. 1) Seventeen chapters detailing different aspects of monastic conduct.
  2. Vinayavibhaṅga (Tōh. 2–5) The codified monastic rules and their commentaries for monks (2 & 3) and nuns (4 & 5).
  3. Vinayakṣudrakavastu (Tōh. 6) A set of miscellaneous topics on matters not covered in the Vinayavastu.
  4. Vinayottaragrantha (Tōh. 7) Ten originally independent texts that serve to further explain the monastic code.
2. Sūtras (mdo)
  1. The Perfection of Wisdom (sher phyin) (Tōh. 8–30) Contains various Prajñāpāramitā sūtras from long to short.
    1. The Six Mothers (believed to be the source of all the shorter texts)
      1. Śatasāhasrikā Prajñāpāramitā (Tōh. 8)
      2. Pañcaviṃśatisāhasrikā Prajñāpāramitā (Tōh. 9)
      3. Aṣṭādaśasāhasrikā Prajñāpāramitā (Tōh. 10)
      4. Daśasāhasrikā Prajñāpāramitā (Tōh. 11)
      5. Aṣṭasāhasrikā Prajñāpāramitā (Tōh. 12)
      6. Prajñāpāramitā Ratnaguṇa Sañcaya Gāthā (Tōh. 13)
    2. The Eleven Children
      1. The Questions of Suvikrāntavikrāmin (Tōh. 14)
      2. Pañcaśatikā Prajñāpāramitā (Tōh. 15)
      3. The Vajracchedikā (Tōh. 16)
      4. Prajñāpāramitānaya Śatapañcaśatikā (Tōh. 17)
      5. Bhagavatī Prajñāpāramitā Pañcāśatikā (Tōh. 18)
      6. Kauśika Prajñāpāramitā (Tōh. 19)
      7. Pañcaviṃśatikā Prajñāpāramitā Mukha (Tōh. 20)
      8. Bhagavatī Prajñāpāramitā Hṛdaya (Tōh. 21)
      9. Svalpākṣara Prajñāpāramitā (Tōh. 22)
      10. Ekākṣarī Mātā Prajñāpāramitā (Tōh. 23)
      11. Saptaśatikā Prajñāpāramitā (Tōh. 24)
    3. Six Short Perfection of Wisdom Texts (Tōh. 25–30)
  2. The Thirteen Late-translated sūtras (Tōḥ. 31–43) These are Tibetan translations of Pāḷi suttas, translated at Tharpaling the 14th century in collaboration between a Tibetan and Sinhala monk. They are the last sūtras to enter into the Kangyur, and so are called the "Late-translated" sūtras. One of these texts, the Vimuttimagga, which is not actually sūtra, is included for unknown reasons in the General Sūtra section (Tōh. 306). The longest text of this collection is the Jātakanidāna (Tōh. 32), which is also not considered a sutta in the Pāḷi tradition. The Āṭānāṭiya Sūtra (Tōh. 33) and Mahāsamaya Sūtra (Tōh. 34) are equivalent to two Sanskrit sūtras translated into Tibetan for the Tantra section as "Mahāsūtras" for protection (Tōh. 656 & 653).
  3. The Buddhāvataṃsaka (Tōh. 44). Contains the Tibetan recension of the Avataṃsaka Sūtra in 45 chapters translated from Chinese.
  4. The Ratnakūṭa collection (Tōh. 45–93). Contains the Tibetan recensions of the various sūtras considered to be part of the Mahāratnakūṭa collection, which also circulated as stand-alone sūtras. Major sūtras in this collection include:
    - (3) The Tathāgatācintya-guhya-nirdeśa (Tōh. 47)
    - (5) The Longer Sukhāvatīvyūha (Tōh. 49)
    - (6) The Akṣobhyavyūha (Tōh. 50)
    - (12) The Bodhisattvapiṭaka (Tōh. 56)
    - (45) The Akṣayamatiparipṛcchā (Tōh. 89)
    - (46) The Saptaśatikā Prajñāpāramitā (Tōh. 90 & cf. Tōh. 24)
    - (47) The Ratnacūḍaparipṛcchā (Tōh. 91)
    - (48) The Śrīmāladevī Siṃhanāda (Tōh. 92)
  5. The General Sūtra section (Tōh. 94–359). Contains all other sūtras translated from Sanskrit and Chinese.
    1. Mahāyāna Sūtras (Tōh. 94–286) Contains most of the major Mahāyāna sūtras not in the other collections, including among the most well-known:
      - Bhadrakalpika (Tōh. 94)
      - Lalitavistara (Tōh. 95)
      - Saṅghāṭasūtra (Tōh. 102)
      - Sandhinirmocana (Tōh. 106)
      - Laṅkāvatāra (Tōh. 107 (from Skt.) & 108 (from Ch.))
      - Ghanavyūhasūtra (Tōh. 110)
      - Karuṇāpuṇḍarīka (Tōh. 112)
      - Saddharmapuṇḍarīka (Tōh. 113)
      - Shorter Sukhāvatīvyūha (Tōh. 115)
      - Kāraṇḍavyūha (Tōh. 116)
      - Mahāparinirvāṇasūtra (Tōh. 119 (from Skt.) & 120 (from Ch.))
      - Samādhirāja (Tōh. 127)
      - Śūraṅgamasamādhisūtra (Tōh. 132)
      - Sūtras of the Mahāsaṃnipāta Collection
        - Ratnaketu Dhāraṇī (Tōh. 138)
        - Tathāgatamahākaruṇānirdeśa (Tōh. 147)
        - Gaganagañjaparipṛcchā (Tōh. 148)
        - Sāgaramatiparipṛcchā (Tōh. 152)
        - Mahāyānopadeśasūtra / Ratnadārikāparipṛcchā (Tōh. 169)
        - Akṣayamatinirdeśa (Tōh. 175)
        - Tathāgataśrīsamayasūtra / Sūryaguhya? (Tōh. 230)
        - Sūryagarbha (Tōh. 257)
      - Vimalakīrtinirdeśa (Tōh. 176)
      - Pañcapāramitānirdeśa (Tōh. 181) = the final five assemblies in Xuanzang's Mahāprajñāpāramitā
      - Śālistamba (Tōh. 210)
      - Aṅgulimālīyasūtra (Tōh. 213)
      - Ajātaśatrukaukṛtyavinodana (Tōh. 216)
      - Mahāmegha (Tōh. 232)
      - Daśacakrakṣitigarbhasūtra (Tōh. 239)
      - Tathāgatagarbhasūtra (Tōh. 258)
      - Ākāśagarbhasūtra (Tōh. 260)
      - Upāyakauśalyasūtra (Tōh. 261)
    2. Śrāvakayāna Sūtras (Tōh. 287–359) This includes various longer sūtras considered to not belong to the Mahāyāna, though these attributions are often disputed. Famous texts include:
      - Saddharmasmṛtyupasthāna (Tōh. 287)
      - The Mahāsūtras which are derived from the Āgamas of the Mūlasarvāstivāda (Tōh. 288–294)
      - Arthaviniścaya (Tōh. 317)
      - Dharmacakrasūtra (Tōh. 337)
      - Karmaśataka (Tōh. 340) – an avadāna collection
      - Damamūka (Tōh. 341) – an avadāna collection
      - Pūrṇapramukhāvadānaśataka (Tōh. 343) – popularly known as just the Avadānaśataka, an avadāna collection
      - Brahmajālasūtra (Tōh. 352)
      - Śārdūlakarṇāvadāna (Tōh. 358)
      - Bodhimaṇḍasyālaṃkāralakṣadhāraṇī (Tōh. 359a) – popularly known as the Sūtra of the Forty-Two Sections
3. Tantra (rgyud)
  1. Tantra Collection (rgyud 'bum) Translations of tantras from the "later spread" as practised by the New Schools (Sarma).
    1. Anuttarayoga / Yoganiruttaratantra (Tōh. 360–478) These are the highest class of tantras, considered "inner tantras," often divided into "non-dual," "mother," and "father" tantras, with the latter two divided into six families of principal deities. Their goal is to realise the absolute non-duality of the meditator and the deity, allowing one to realise their innate wisdom. Historically, these were the last tantras to have developed starting from the 8th century.
      1. Non-dual Tantras (Tōh. 360–365)
        - Mañjuśrīnāmasaṅgīti (Tōh. 360)
        - Extracts from the Kālacakra Root Tantra (Tōh. 361)
        - Abbreviated Kālacakra Tantra (Tōh. 362)
        - Extracts from the Kālacakra Root Tantra on Empowerment (Tōh. 363–365)
      2. 76 Mother Tantras (Tōh. 366–441)
        1. The Section where the six families are equal (Tōh. 366–367) – The Two Ḍākinījālaśaṃvara Tantras
        2. Heruka Family (Tōh. 368–427)
          1. Abbreviated Śaṃvara Tantra (Tōh. 368)
            - Explanatory tantras on the Śaṃvara Tantra (Tōh. 369–382)
            - Explanatory tantras called Rali Tantras (Tōh. 383–415)
            - Mahākāla Tantra (Tōh. 416)
          2. Two part Hevajra Root Tantra (Tōh. 417–418)
            - Explanatory tantras on the Hevajra Tantra (Tōh. 419–422)
            - Hevajra Fruition Tantra (Tōh. 423)
          3. Buddhakapāla Tantra (Tōh. 424)
          4. Mahāmāya Tantra (Tōh. 425)
          5. Vajrārali Tantra (Tōh. 426–427)
        3. Vairocana Family (Tōh. 428–434)
          1. The Vairocana root tantra, the Catuḥpīṭhatantra (Tōh. 428)
            - Explanatory tantras on the Vairocana Root Tantra (Tōh. 429–430)
          2. Caṇḍamahāroṣaṇa Tantra (Tōh. 431)
          3. Acala tantras (Tōh. 432–434)
        4. Vajrasūrya Family (Tōh. 435) – the Vajrāmṛta Tantra
        5. Padma Lord Family (Tōh. 436–437)
          1. Kulalokanāthapañcadaśaka Tantra (Tōh. 436)
          2. Kurukullā Tantra (Tōh. 437)
        6. Aśvottama Family (Tōh. 438–440)
          1. Praise of Tārā in Twenty-One Homages (Tōh. 438)
          2. Vajrakīlaya Root Tantra fragment (Tōh. 439)
          3. Tantra of Mahākāla (Tōh. 440)
          4. Tārāyoginī tantras (Tōh. 448–449)
        7. Vajradhara Family (Tōh. 441) – the Khasama Tantra
      3. 37 Father Tantras Tōh. 442–478)
        1. Akṣobhya Family (Tōh. 442–465)
          1. Guhyasamāja Tantra (Tōh. 442)
            - Explanatory tantras for the Guhyasamāja (Tōh. 443–453)
            - Tārāyoginī tantras (Tōh. 448–449) are considered to actually belong to the Mother Tantra Aśvottama Family.
          2. Vajrapāṇi Tantras (Tōh. 454–457, 463–464)
        2. Vairocana Family (Tōh. 466–475)
          - Māyājāla Tantra (Tōh. 466)
          - Yamāri / Yamāntaka and Vajrabhairava tantras.
        3. Ratnasambhava Family (not in present in Tibetan)
        4. Amitābha Family (Tōh. 476) – Ekajaṭa Tantra
        5. Amoghasiddhi Family (not present in Tibetan)
        6. Vajradhara Family
          1. Candraguhyatilaka Tantra (Tōh. 477
          2. Raktayamāri Tantra (Tōh. 478)
    2. Yoga Tantra (Tōh. 479–493) The highest of the "outer tantras." These meditational tantras emphasise skilful means and wisdom, but still have "external" practices based on maṇḍalas with all five Buddha families present, presided over by Mahāvairocana. They involve visualisation of oneself as the deity, with the goal of realising one's inseparability from the deity. These tantras date mostly to the 7th century, and were more openly transmitted than the higher tantras.
      1. 8 Tantras of Skilful Means (Tōh. 479–486)
        - Sarvatathāgatatattvasaṃgraha (Tōh. 479)
          - Explanations of the Sarvatathāgatatattvasaṃgraha:
            1. Vajraśekhara (Tōh. 480)
            2. Sarvarahasya (Tōh. 481)
            3. Trailokyavijaya (Tōh. 482)
        - Sarvadurgatipariśodhana (Tōh. 483)
          - Two alternate translations thereof (Tōh. 484–485)
        - Supratiṣṭha Tantra (Tōh. 486)
      2. 7 Tantras of Wisdom (Tōh. 487–493) These are a tantric sub-corpus of the Prajñāpāramitā.
        - Śrīparamādya in two sections (Tōh. 487–488)
        - Prajñāpāramitānayaśatapañcaśatikā (Tōh. 489)
        - Vajramaṇḍālaṁkāra Tantra (Tōh. 490)
        - Pañcaviṃśatikā Prajñāpāramitā Mukha (Tōh. 491)
        - Guhyālaṃkāravyūha Tantra (Tōh. 492)
        - Guhyamaṇitilaka Sūtra (Tōh. 493)
      3. In other systems, the Mañjuśrīnāmasaṅgīti (Tōh. 360) and Māyājāla Tantra (Tōh. 466) are considered Yoga Tantra.
    3. Caryā Tantra (Tōh. 494–501) These "practice" class tantras aim at liberation through a combination of ritual and meditation. They have three families.
      1. Tathāgata Family (Tōh. 494–495)
        1. Vairocanābhisambodhi (Tōh. 494)
        2. Acalamahākrodharāja Kalpa (Tōh. 495)
      2. Padma Family (not represented in the Derge)
      3. Vajra Family (Tōh. 496–501) – Six short Vajrapāṇi tantras
    4. Kriyā Tantra (Tōh. 502–808) These 308 "action" tantras emphasise outer ritual for the attainment of siddhi or powers, the subduing of obstacles, and attainment of fortune. One worships the deity out of subservience in these practices. They have seven groups (three supramundane families, three mundane families, and one miscellaneous section).
      1. Tathāgata Family (Tōh. 502–673)
        1. Texts featuring the principal deity of the family including:
          - Medicine Buddha tantras (Tōh. 502–505)
          - Tantras for other buddhas (Tōh. 506–513)
          - Dependent Origination and its mantra (Tōh. 519–521)
          - Prajñāpāramitā Heart sūtras (Tōh. 530–531)
          - 108 Names of the Buddha (Tōh. 532)
          - Śākyamuni Dhāraṇī (Tōh. 533)
          - Vairocana Dhāraṇī (Tōh. 534)
        2. 10 texts on the "Turner of the Wheel" of the family, Mañjuśrī (Tōh. 543–552), including the Mañjuśrīyamūlakalpa.
        3. 37 texts on the "Mother" of the Family (Tōh. 553–589)
          - Prajñāpāramitā Devī (Tōh. 553–554, 576–581, 583)
          - Suvarṇaprabhā (Tōh. 555–557)
          - Pañcarakṣā Devīs (Tōh. 558–563, 587–588)
          - Mārīcī (Tōh. 564–566)
          - Jayavatī (Tōh. 567–568)
          - Sūtra heart incantations (Tōh. 583–586, 589)
        4. 13 Texts on the Uṣṇīṣas of the Tathāgata (Tōh. 590–603)
          - Uṣṇīṣasitātapatrā (Tōh. 590–593)
          - Uṣṇīṣavijayā (Tōh. 594–600)
          - Stūpas (Tōh. 601–602)
        5. 10 Texts on Wrathful Deities (Tōh. 604–613)
        6. 20 Texts on Male and Female Messenger Goddesses (Tōh. 614–633) – focuses on overcoming epidemics and diseases. Includes the Vaiśālipraveśa Mahāsūtra (Tōh. 628)
        7. 19 Texts on Bodhisattvas in the Tathāgata Family (Tōh. 634–652) – includes texs enumerating their names as well as on using their qualities to develop on the path.
        8. 21 Texs on the Devas of Pure Places (Tōh. 653–673) – includes texts on various wealth and protector deities, as well as some Mahāsūtras.
      2. Padma Family (Tōh. 674–742)
        1. 6 texts featuring the principle deity of the family (Tōh. 674–680)
          - Works on the form of Amitāyus, Aparimitāyus, or Aparimitāyurjñāna (Tōh. 674–675)
          - Works on the form of Amitābha (Tōh. 676–680)
        2. 43 texts on the "Turner of the Wheel" of the family, Avalokiteśvara (Tōh. 681–723)
        3. 9 texts on the "Mother" of the Family, Tāra (Tōh. 724–732)
        4. 4 texts on the wrathful male and female deities of the family (Tōh. 733–736)
          - Hayagrīva (Tōh. 733)
          - Pratyaṅgirā (Tōh. 734)
          - Parṇaśabarī (Tōh. 735–736)
        5. 6 texts on the male and female attendant deities of the family (Tōh. 737–741)
          - Pratyaṅgirā (Tōh. 737)
          - Sarasvatī (Tōh. 738)
          - Mahādevī (Tōh. 738–741)
      3. Vajra Family (Tōh. 743–763)
        1. 1 text on the principal deity, Akṣobhya (Tōh. 743).
        2. 7 texts on the lords of the family, all forms of Vajrapāṇi (Tōh. 744–751)
        3. 1 text on the "Mother" of the family, Vajrājitānalapramohanī (Tōh. 751)
        4. 3 texts on the wrathful male and female deities of the family (Tōh. 753–755)
        5. 8 texts on the male and female messenger and attendant deities of the family (Tōh. 756–763)
      4. Wealth-god Family (Tōh. 764–771)
        - 8 texts on wealth gods like Maṇibhadra (Tōh. 764–765) and Jambhala (Tōh. 768–771).
      5. Increase Family (Tōh. 772) – Mekhalā Dhāraṇī
      6. Worldly Family (Tōh. 773) – Mahāśvāsa Dhāraṇī
      7. Miscellaneous Brief Dhāraṇīs (Tōh. 774–804)
        - For circumambulating (Tōh. 775–776)
        - For purifying offerings (Tōh. 777–778)
        - For prostrations (Tōh. 779)
        - For finding clothes (Tōh. 780)
        - For pleasing others (Tōh. 781)
        - For purifying lower realms (Tōh. 782)
        - For treating ailments (Tōh. 783–4, 798–803)
        - For becoming attractive (Tōh. 791–792)
        - For success (Tōh. 793–794)
        - For escaping bondage (Tōh. 796)
        - For intimidating demons (Tōh. 797)
    5. Praṇidhāna (Tōh. 809–827) – dedication prayers and expressions of auspiciousness, primarily various maṅgala gāthās.
  2. Old Tantras (rnying rgyud) Translations of tantras from the "early spread" as practised by the Old School (Nyingma).
    1. Atiyoga (Tōh. 828) – the Bodhicittakulayarāja
    2. Anuyoga (Tōh. 829–831)
      1. Samājasarvavidyāsūtra (Tōh. 829)
      2. Jñānāścaryadyuticakra (Tōh. 830)
      3. Vajrakulatantrapiṇḍārthavidyāyogasiddha (Tōh. 831)
    3. Mahāyoga (Tōh. 832–844)
      1. Tantras (Tōh. 832–837) – the Māyājāla Corpus
        1. 22 Chapter Guhyagarbha (Tōh. 832)
        2. Vajrasattvamāyājālaguhyasarvādarśa (Tōh. 833)
        3. 80 Chapter Guhyagarbha (Tōh. 834)
        4. Explanatory texts for the Guhyagarbha and emphasising empowerment (Tōh. 835–837)
      2. Means for Attainment (Tōh. 838–844) – texts on meditational deities:
        1. On Mañjuśrī-Yamāntaka (Tōh. 838) – Body
        2. On Hayagrīva-Aśvottama (Tōh. 839) – Speech
        3. On Śrīheruka (Tōh. 840) – Mind
        4. On Vajrāmṛta (Tōh. 841) – Qualities
        5. On Vajrakīla (Tōh. 841A) – Activities
        6. Three mundane tantras (Tōh. 842–844)
  3. Kālacakra Tantra Commentary (dus ’khor ’grel bshad) (Tōh. 845)
4. Dhāraṇī (gzungs)
  1. The Dhāraṇīsaṅgraha Collection (Tōh. 846–1108) A collection of 250 dhāraṇīs.
  2. Praṇidhāna (Tōh. 1094–1108) A collection of aspiration and dedication prayers like the famous Bhadracaryāpraṇidhāna (Tōh. 1095). Most of these are found elsewhere in the Kangyur as duplicates.
5. Kangyur Catalog (Tōh. 4568) The descriptive catalogue of the Derge Kangyur, together with an explanation of the collection's history and translation, composed by the Situ Panchen Chokyi Jungne.

== Bön Kangyur ==
The Tibetan Bön religion also has its canon literature divided into two sections called the Kangyur and Tengyur, said to have been translated from foreign languages, but the number and contents of the collection are not yet fully known. Apparently, Bön began to take on a literary form about the time Buddhism entered Tibet. The Bön Kangyur contains the revelations of Tonpa Shenrab (Wylie: gShen rab), the traditional founder of Bön. A version was published in 1993-1997. The Bon traditions of the Tibetan part of the Chinese tripitaka Zhonghua da zang jing (中華大藏經) has also been published in 2022.
