= Aparimitāyurjñāna Sūtra =

The Aparimitāyurjñāna Sūtra (or simply Aparimitāyuḥsūtra) is a Mahayana sutra focusing on the buddha Aparimitāyus (also known as Aparimitāyurjñānasuviniścitatejorāja) and his dhāraṇī, which the sutra recommends reciting to obtain long life.

The Aparimitāyuḥsūtra is one of the most commonly copied dharani sutras. It was particularly popular in Central Asia and Tibet. Thousands of copies were made in the late Tibetan Empire, the majority of which are now found in collections of Dunhuang manuscripts in the Bibliothèque nationale de France, the British Library, with smaller collections in Russia, China and Taiwan.

A full Khotanese version of the scripture also survives. There are also numerous Sanskrit manuscripts.

The Aparimitāyus dharani is still widely recited in modern Tibetan Buddhism, specifically as a long life practice.

Versions of this dharani sutra was also translated into Chinese twice (T936 and T937). The Aparimitāyus dharani is also part of the Ten Small Mantras, a popular set of mantra-dharanis used in Chinese Buddhism.
