= Zuishin-in =

Buddhist temple in Kyoto, Japan

- 随心院
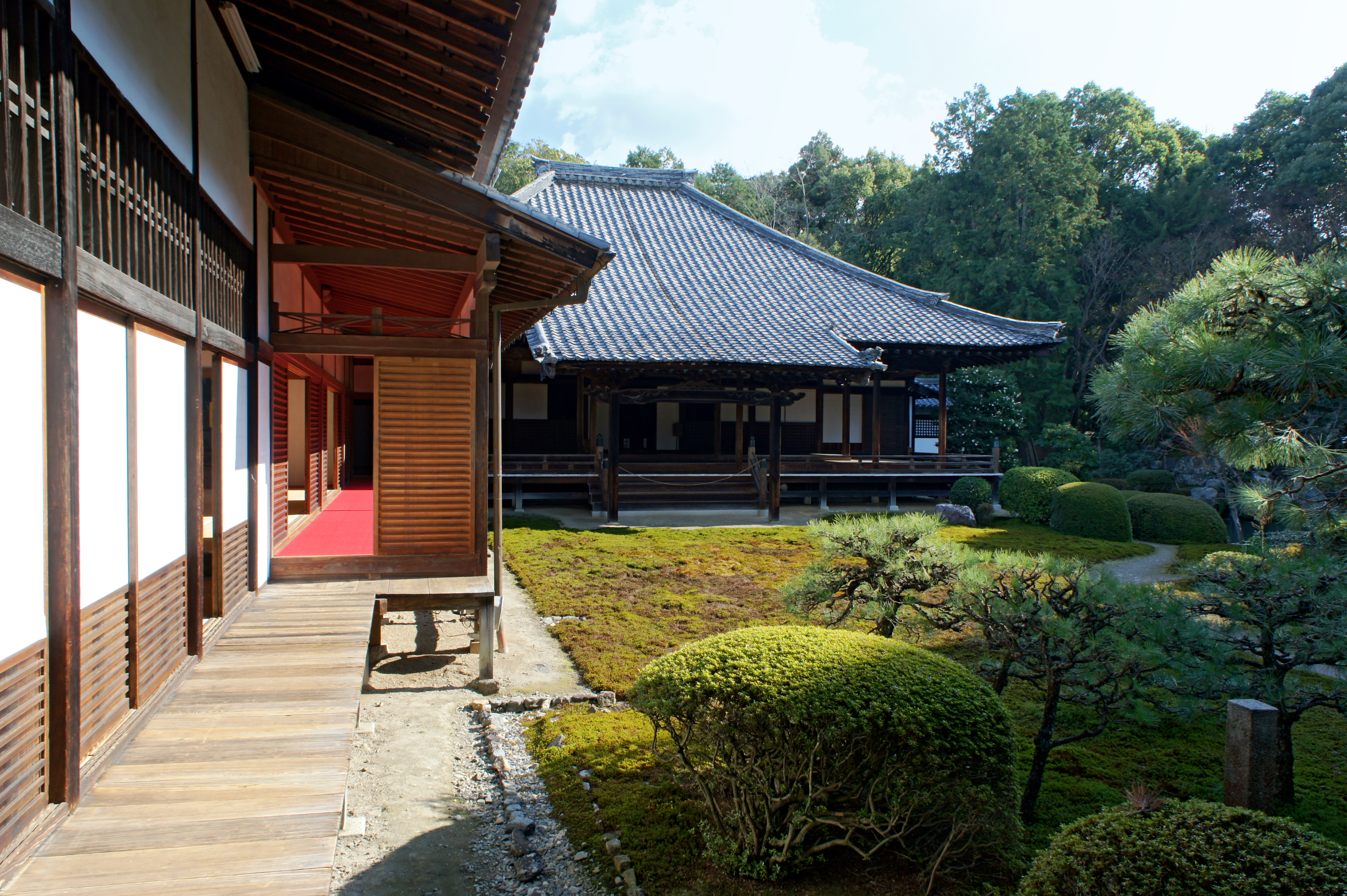
- Zuishin-in

- Location within Kyoto Prefecture Location within Japan

Religion
- Affiliation: Buddhist
- Deity: NyoirinKannon
- Rite: Shingon Zentsu-ji-branch
- Status: functional

Location
- Location: 35 Ono-Goryo-cho, Yamashina-ku, Kyoto-shi, Kyoto-fu
- Country: Japan
- Interactive map of Zuishin-in
- Coordinates: 34°57′34.18″N 135°48′58.63″E

Architecture
- Completed: 991

Website
- Official website
- National Historic Site

Zuishin-in (随心院) is a Buddhist temple located in the Onogoryō-chō neighborhood of Yamashina-ku, Kyoto, Japan. It is a head temple of the Zentsuji school of Shingon Buddhism. Its sangō prefix is Ushiyama (牛山). The Ono district where the temple is located is considered the base of the Ono clan, and Zuishin-in is also known as a temple associated with the famed Heian period waka poet Ono no Komachi. Its precincts were designated a National Historic Site in 1966.

== History ==
Zuishin-in was originally a tatchu sub-temple of Gohizan Mandala-ji, which was founded by Ningai (954–1046). Ningai is the founder of the Ono school of Shingon Buddhism. He is said to have prayed for rain nine times at Shinsen-en Garden, and made it rain each time, so he was nicknamed "Rain Sōjō". Mandala-ji was built in 991 after Emperor Ichijō bestowed upon Ningai the land next to the Ono family residence. According to legend, Ningai dreamed that his late mother had been reincarnated as a cow, and raised the cow, but it died shortly after. In grief, he painted the Mandala of the Two Realms on the cow's hide and made it the principal image of the temple, hence the name "Ushiyama Mandala-ji." There is a similar story in the Kojidan, but in this version, it is Ningai's father, not his mother, who became the cow.

During the reign of the fifth abbot, Zōshun, Zuishin-in was founded. During the reign of the sixth abbot, Kengon, it became a place of prayer for Emperor Juntoku, Emperor Go-Horikawa, and Emperor Shijō. During the time of the 7th abbot Shingon (1151–1236), who served as the head priest of Tō-ji and also the head priest of Tōdai-ji, the temple became a monzeki temple (a temple where members of the imperial family or members of the regent family could become abbots) in 1229 by imperial decree of Emperor Go-Horikawa. After that, many members of the Ichijō, Nijō, and Kujō families entered the temple. The temple had many lands in Yamashiro, Harima, and Kii Provinces, but most of the temple was burned down during the Jōkyū and Ōnin Wars. According to the "Zuishin'in History Ryaku," after the Ōnin War, the temple was repeatedly moved to its current location, Kujō Karahashi and the area around Shōkoku-ji. Later, in 1599, during the time of the 24th abbot Masuko (from the Kujō family), the main hall was rebuilt at the former site of Mandara-ji.

Gyōgon (1717–1787), head priest of the temple in the mid-Edo period, was the son of the regent Kujō Sukezane and rose to the position of Daisōjō (Grand Priest). However, following the early death of Kujō Tanenori, he returned to secular life in 1743 and took the name Kujō Naozane, becoming the regent and the Daijō-daijin.

Since the Meiji period, the various branches of Shingon Buddhism have repeatedly fought, split off, and merged. Even after the Ōmuro, Daigo, and Daikakuji branches split off, Zuishin-in remained in the "Shingon" sect, but in 1907, the "Shingon" sect at that time was dissolved and the Yamashina, Ono, Tōji, and Sennyūji branches became independent. Zuishin-in became the head temple of the Ono sect. Later, in 1931, the Ono branch was renamed the "Zentsuji branch". In 1941, Zentsu-ji was promoted to the head temple. Currently, Zentsu-ji, which was built on the birthplace of the sect's founder Kūkai, is the head temple of the Zentsuji sect, and Zuishin-in is the administrative headquarters.

The current Main Hall of the temple was rebuilt in 1599 in the Shinden-zukuri style of architecture from the Momoyama period. It houses the honzon of the temple, a Kamakura period hibutsu statue of Nyoirin Kannon along with various other statues, including a Heian period Amida Nyorai. Both of the statues are National Important Cultural Properties. The Sanmon gate of the temple, the Kuri refrectory, and a Noh stage were built during the Hōreki era (1753) and are donations from the Kujō family. The Omote Shoin was rebuilt in the Kan'ei era (1624–1631) with fusuma by Kanō Einō. The building was a donation by Toyotomi Sadako, a daughter of Toyotomi Hideyoshi.

As the temple is associated with the Ono clan by its location, it has a number of artifacts attributed to Ono no Komachi, who is said to have retired to this location after leaving court. These include a memorial stupa, a well where she drew water, and a mound where it is claimed that she buried a thousand love letters that she had received from courtiers at court.

随心院境内

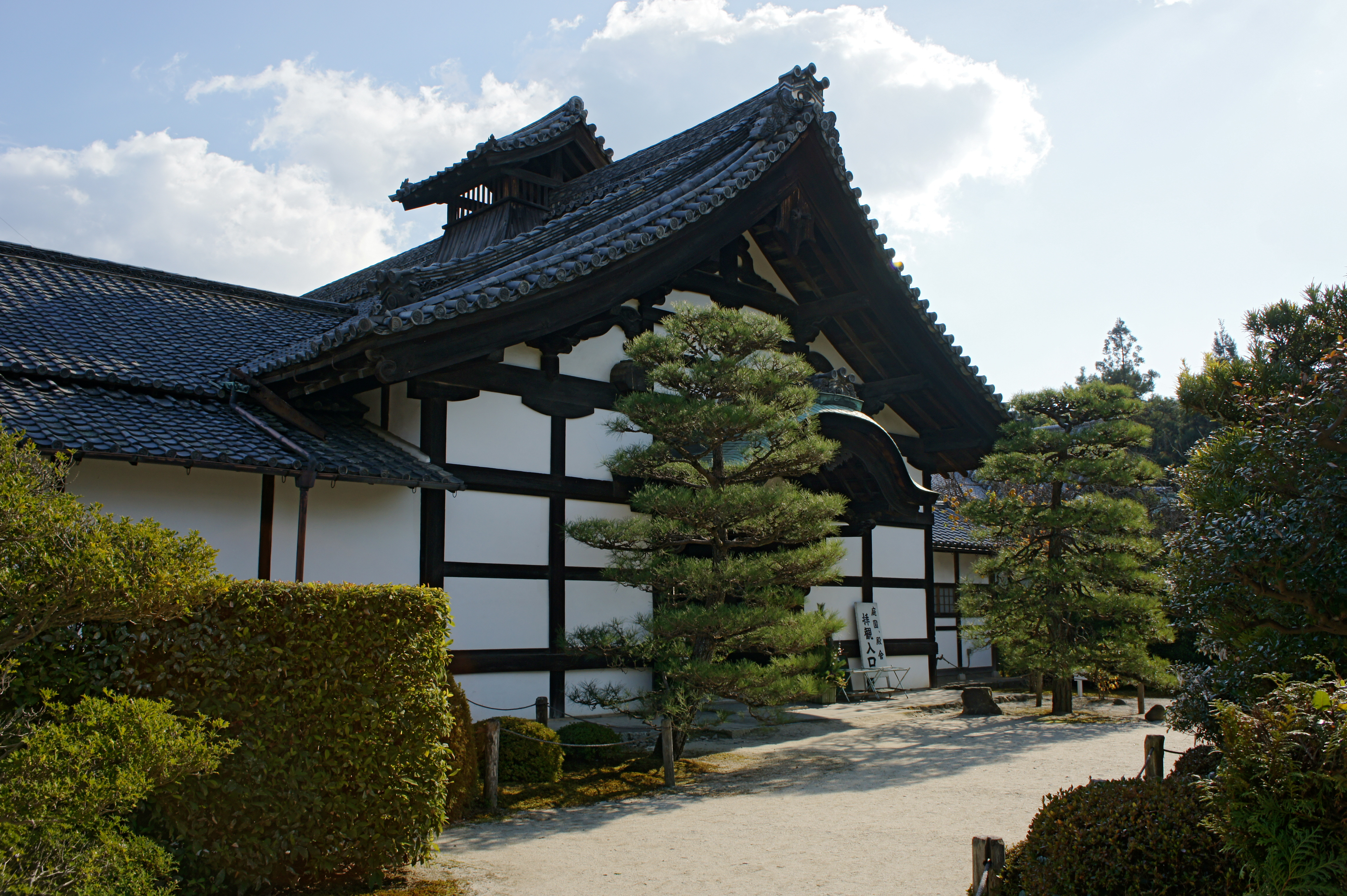
Kuri, entry

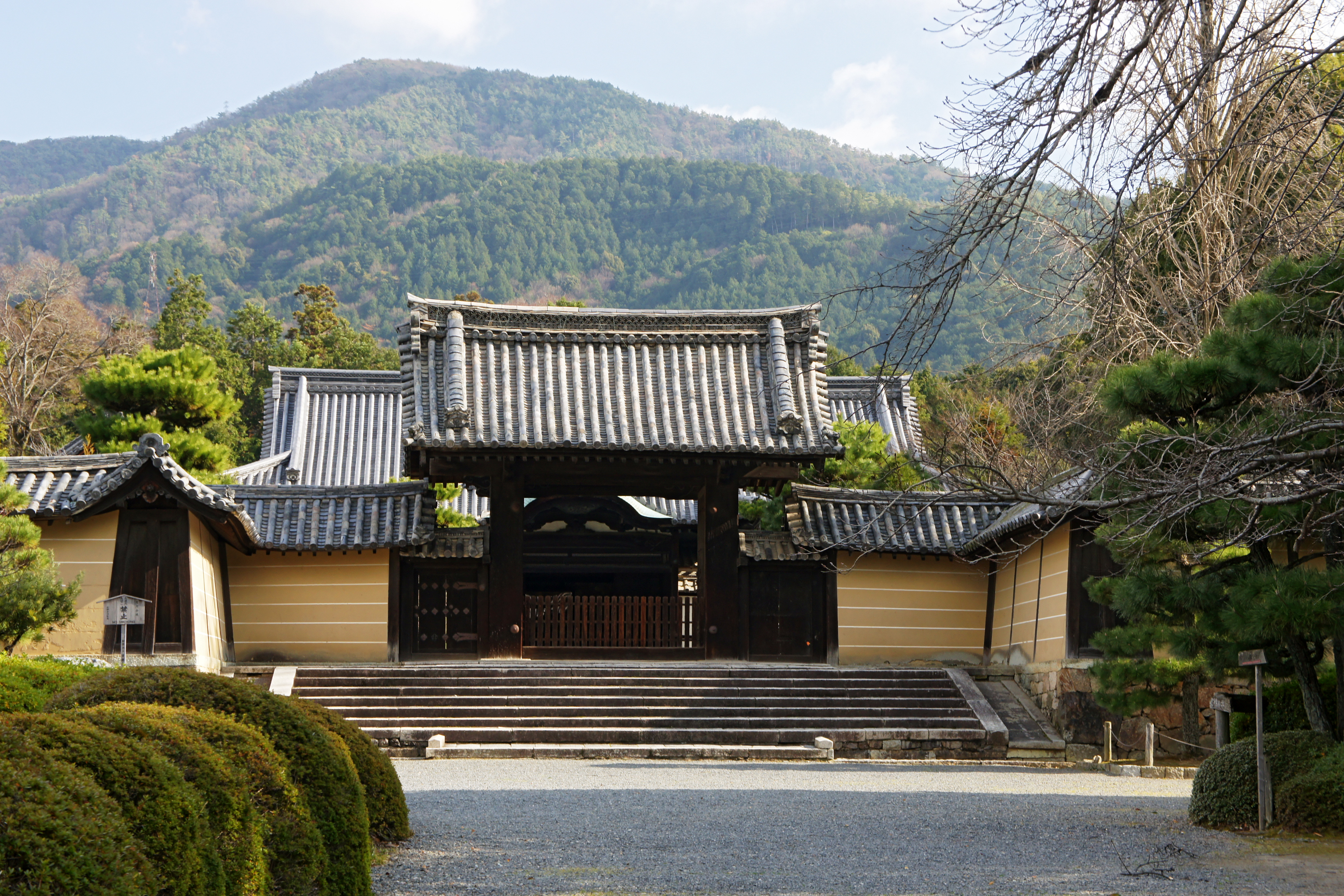
Yakui gate

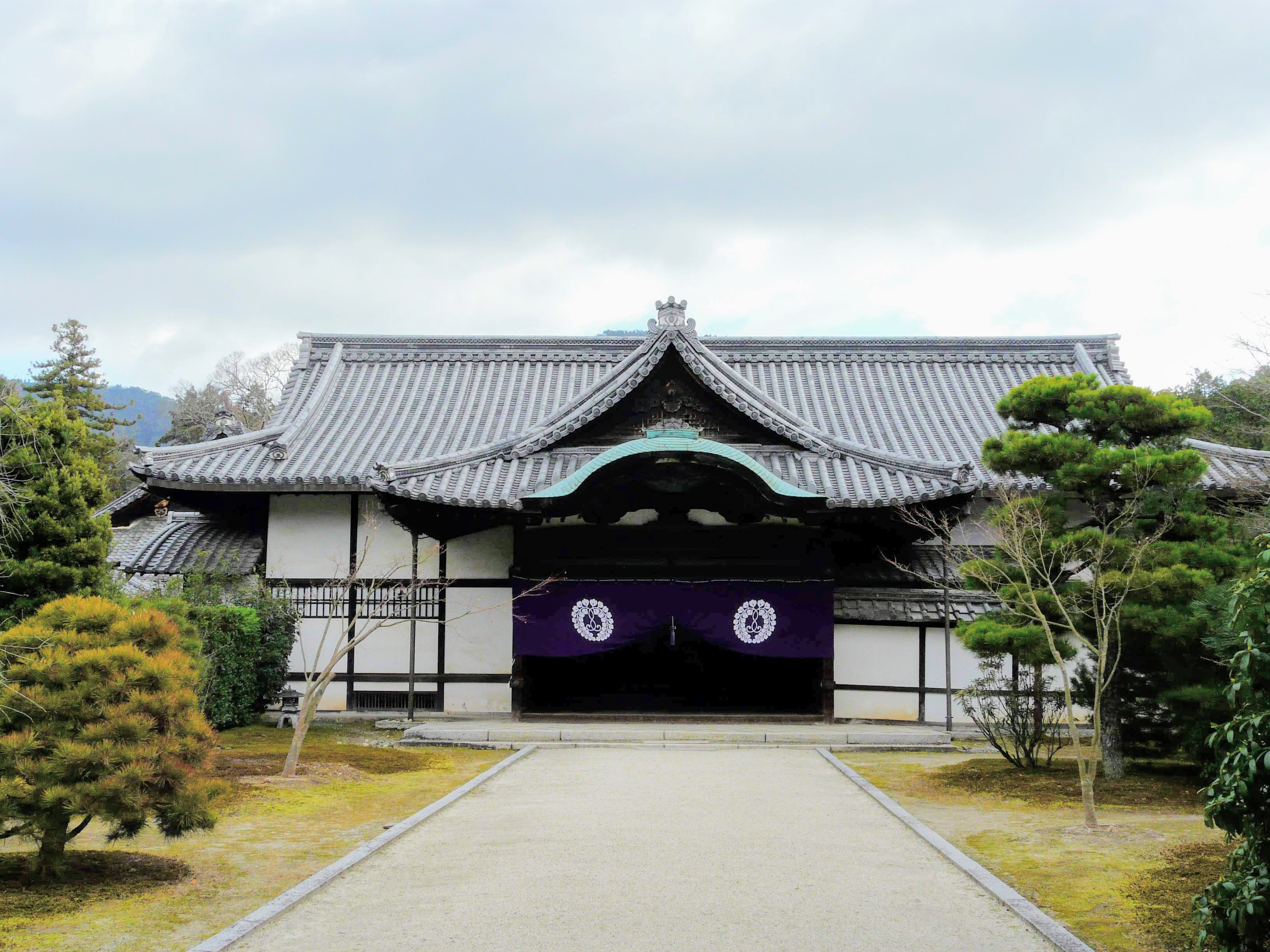
Dai Genkan

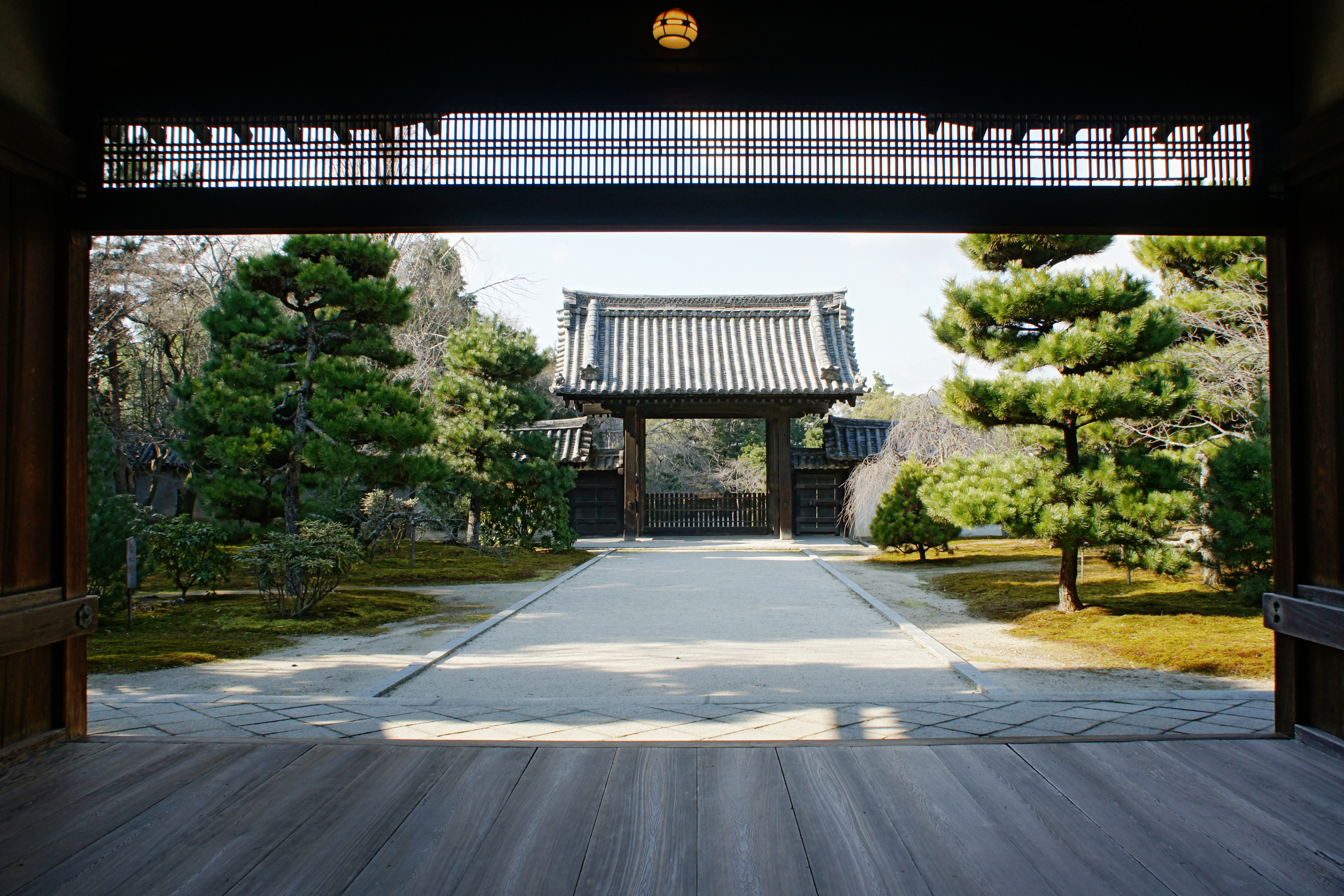
View from the gate

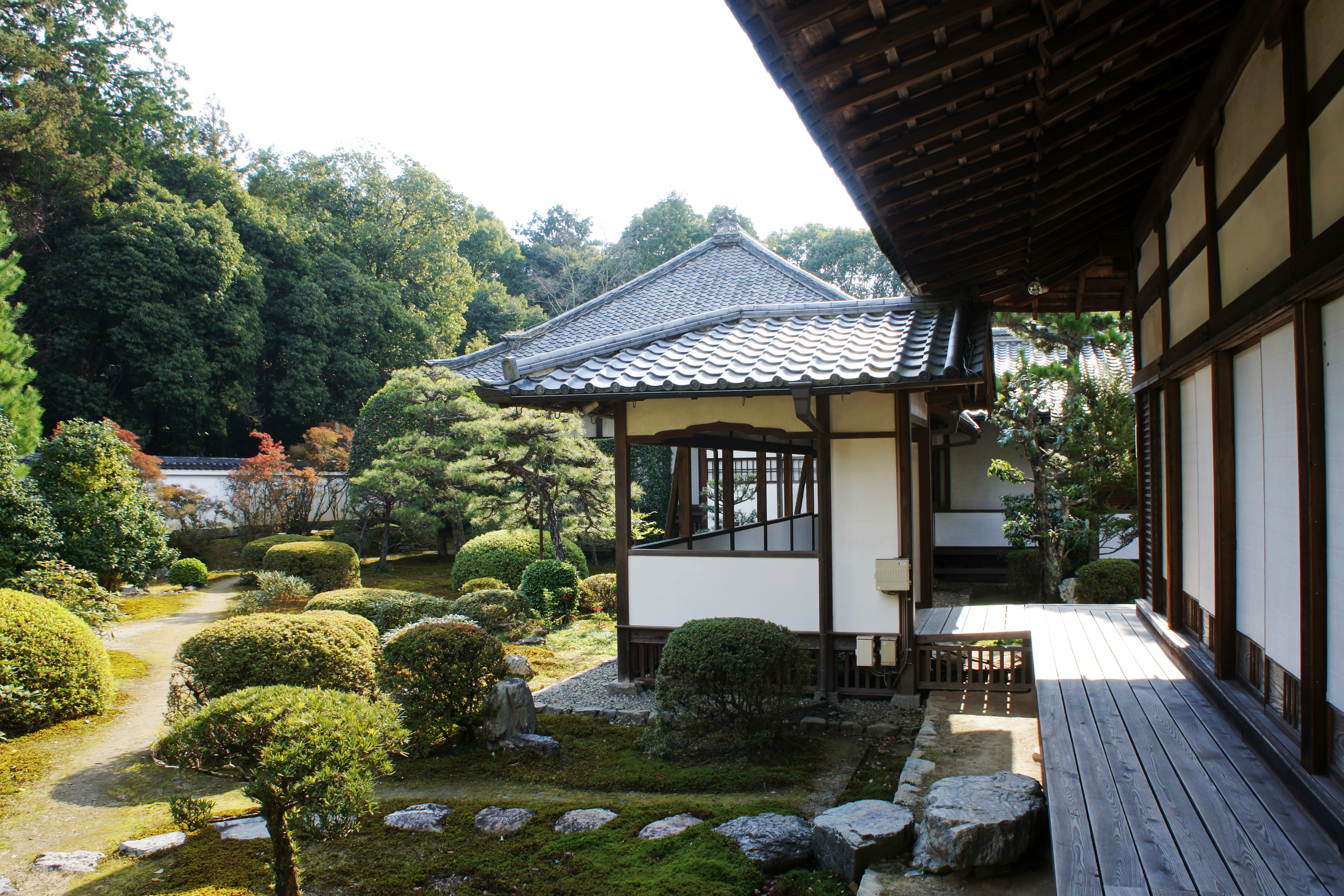
Gardens

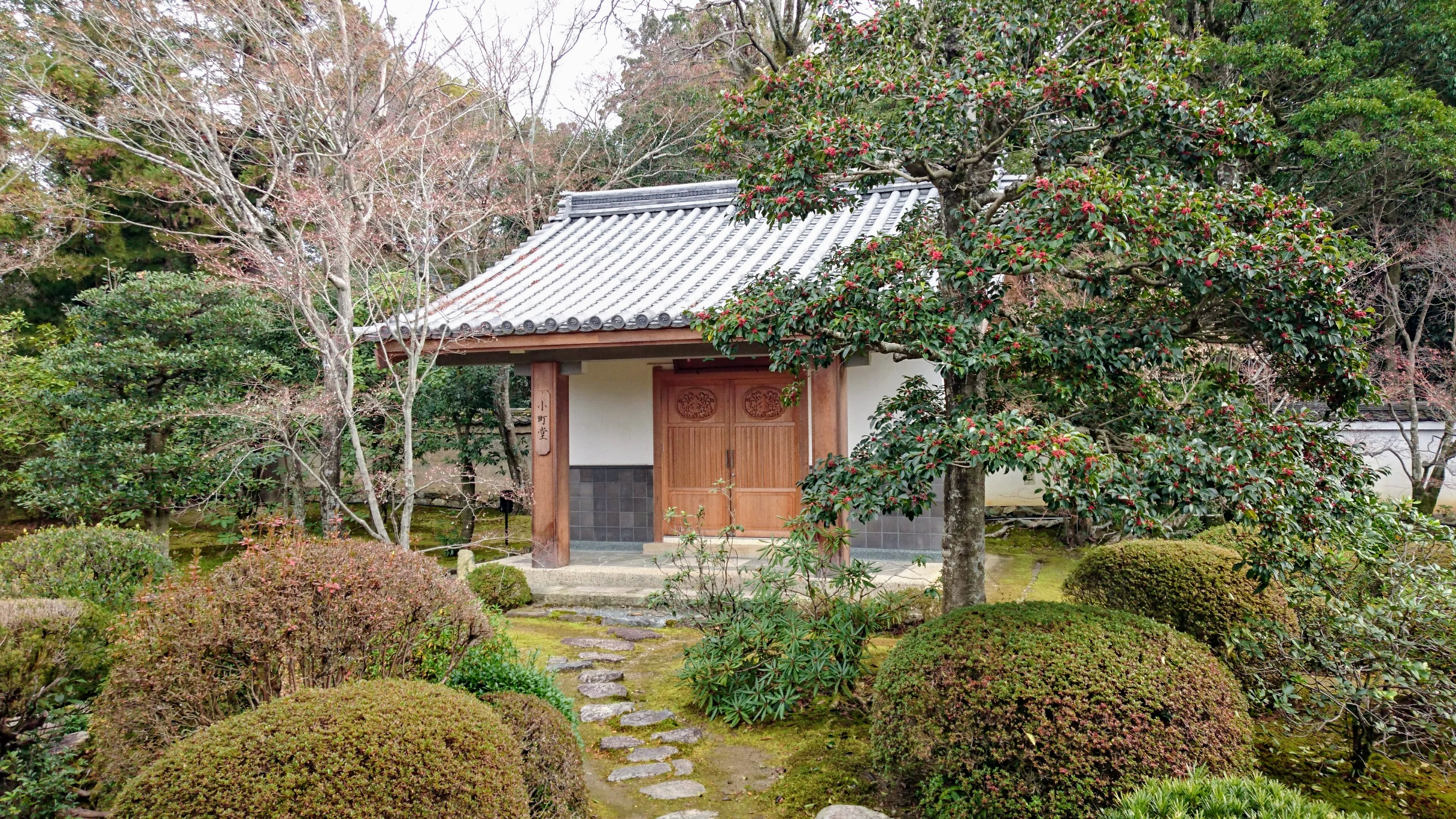
Komachi-do（ossuary）

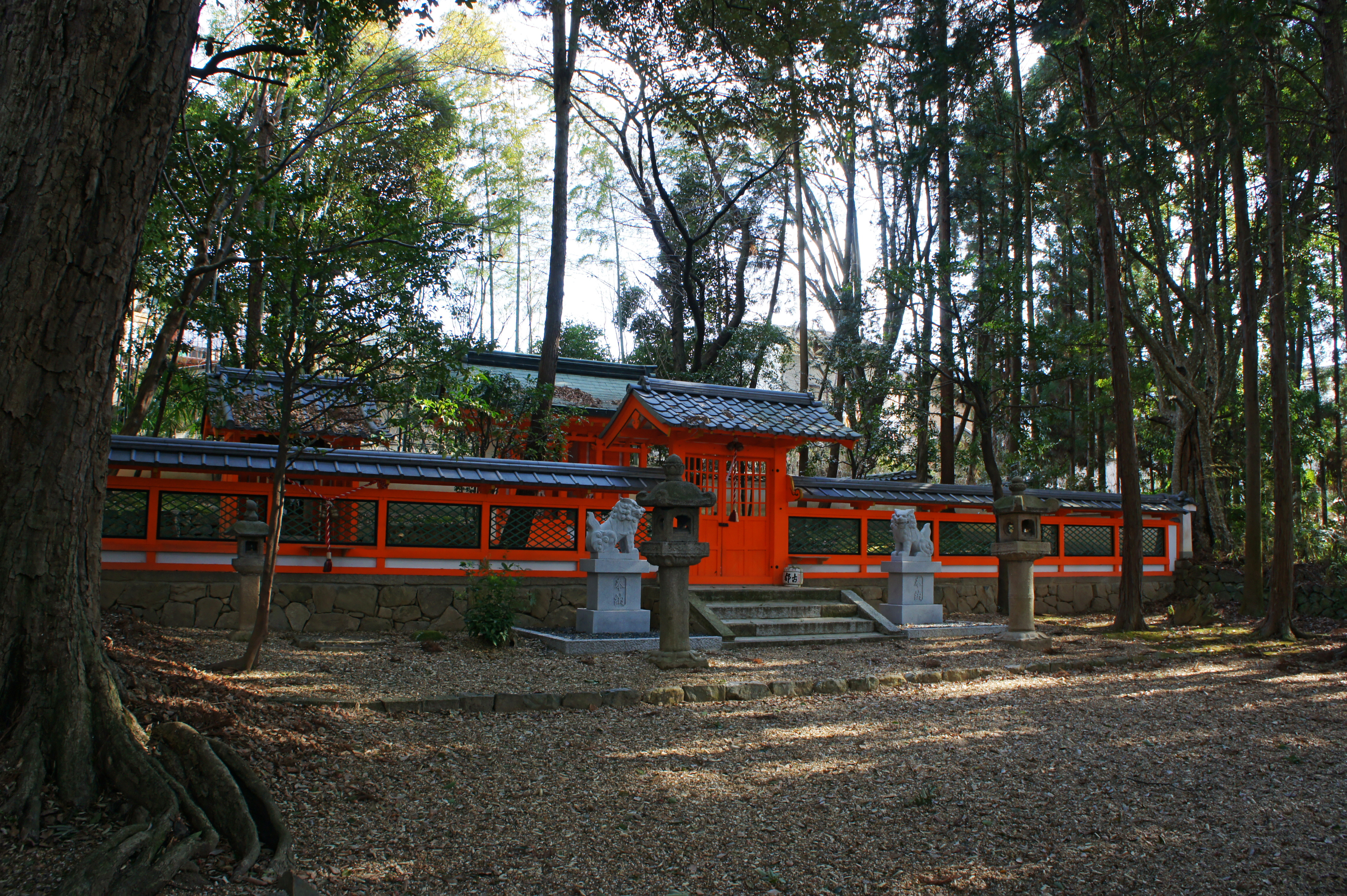
Kiyotake Gongen Shrine

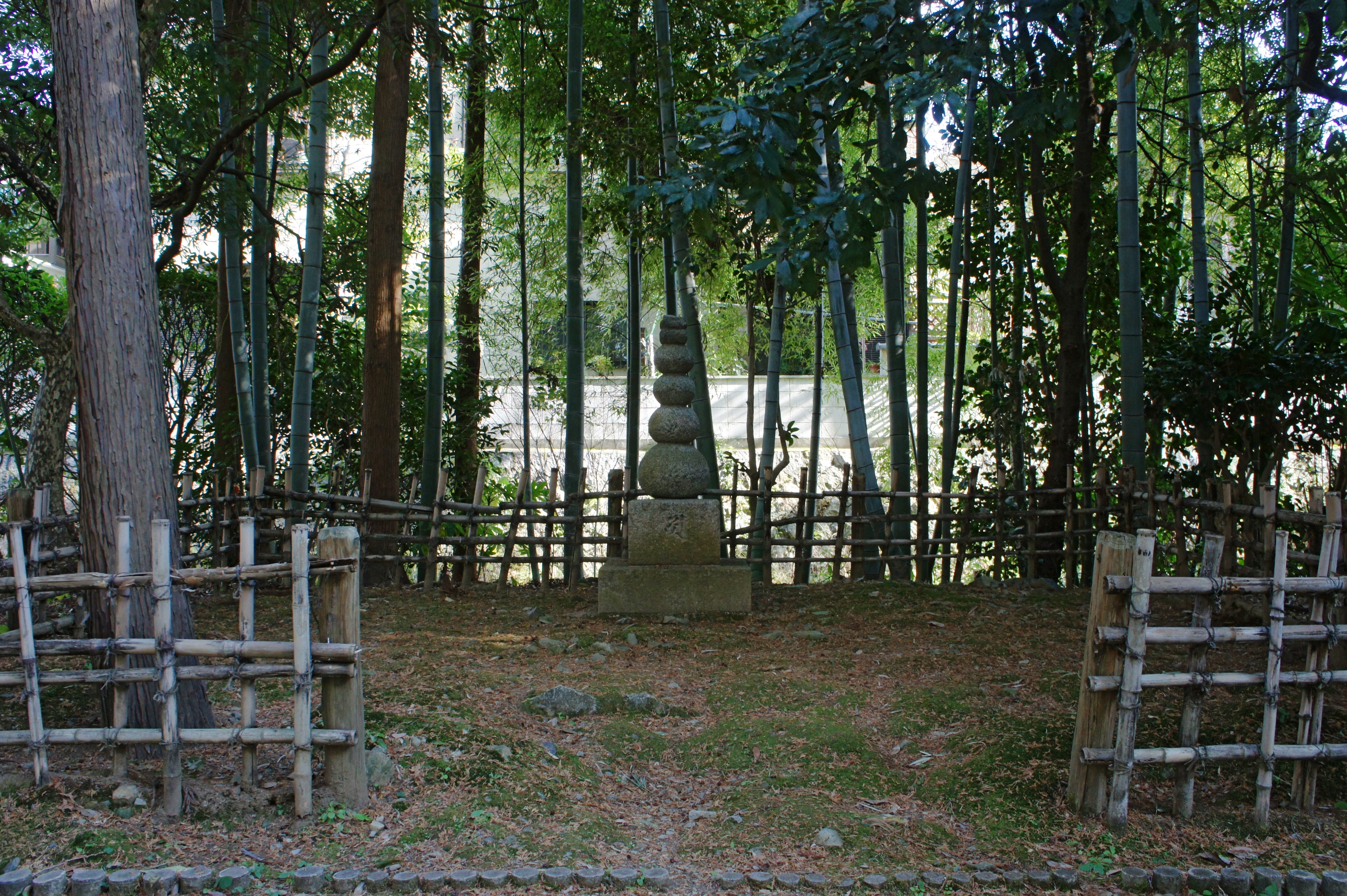
Ono no Komachi Letter Mound

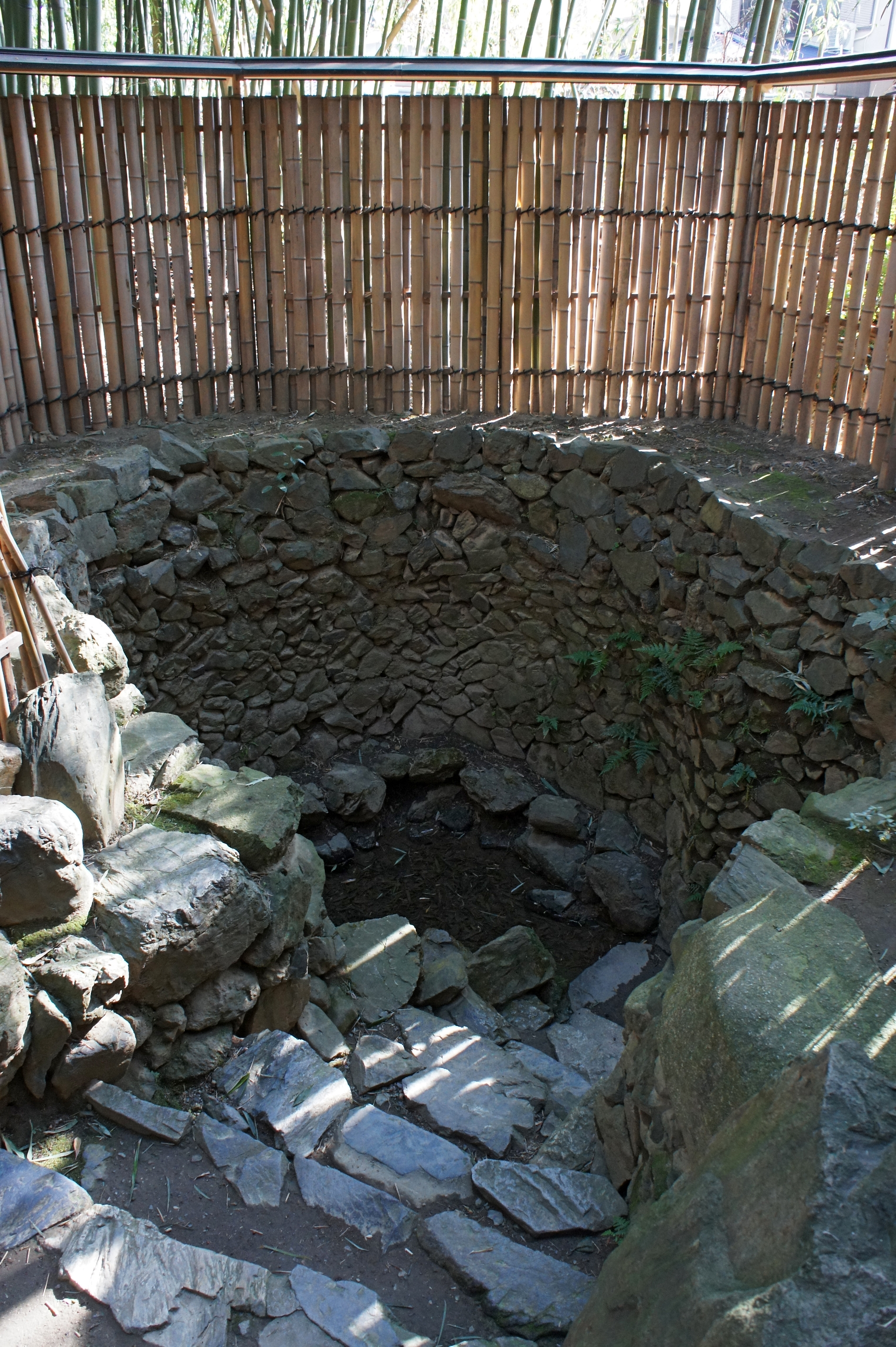
Ono no Komachi's well

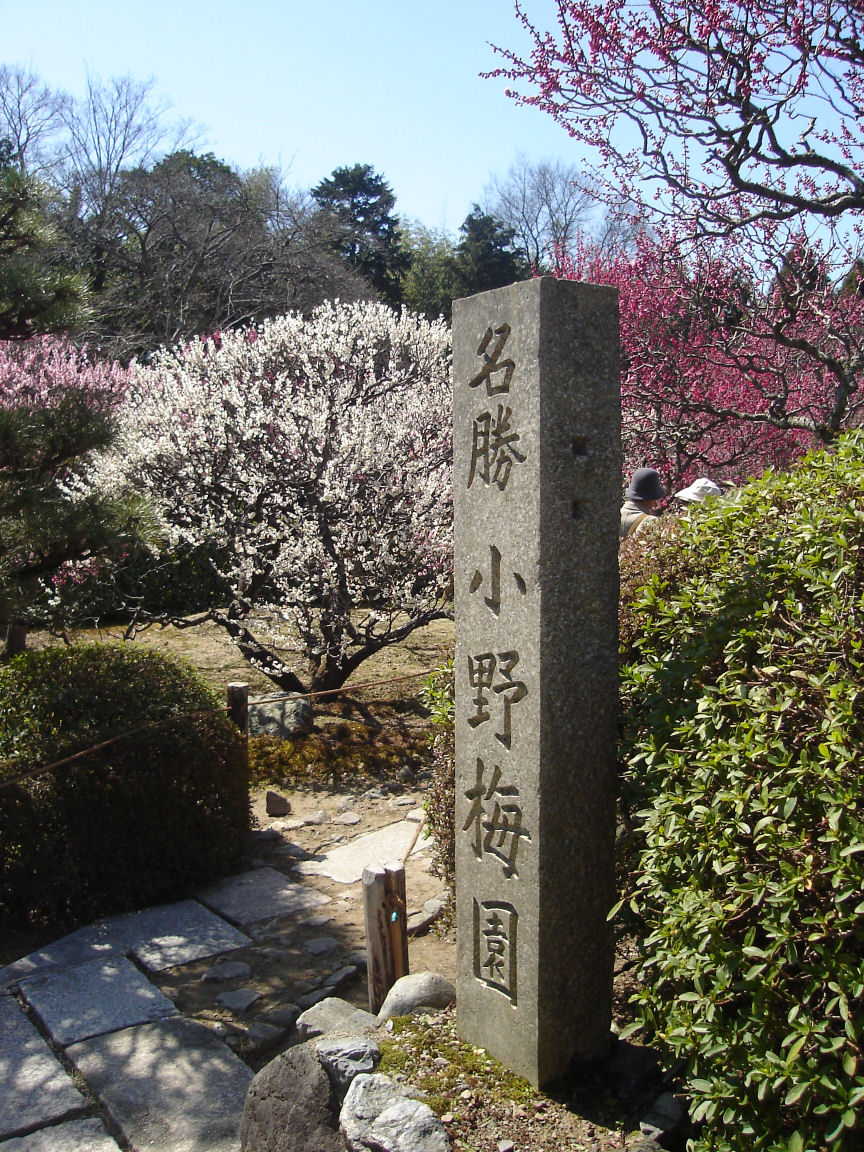
Plum Gardens

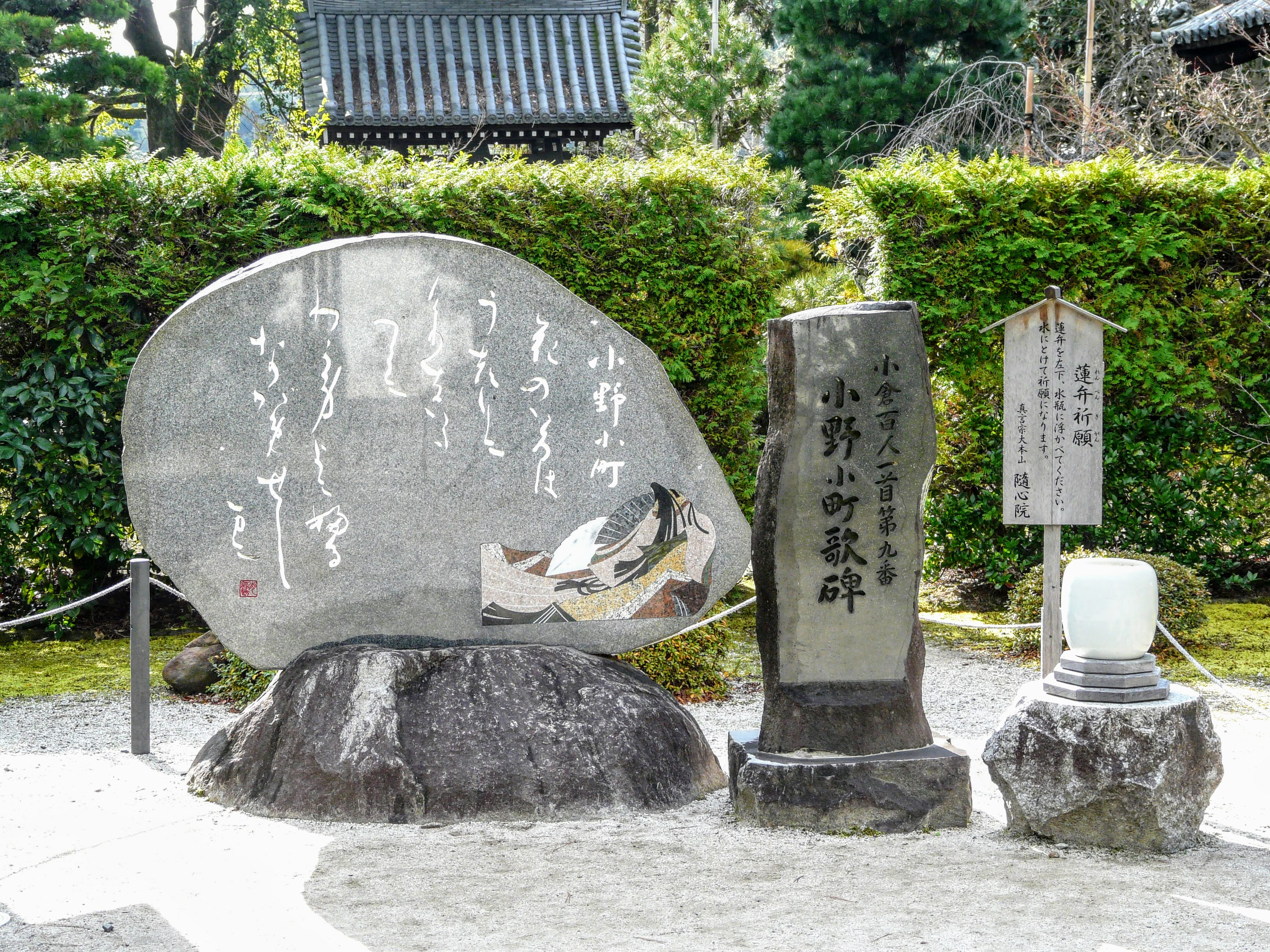
Ono no Komachi poetry

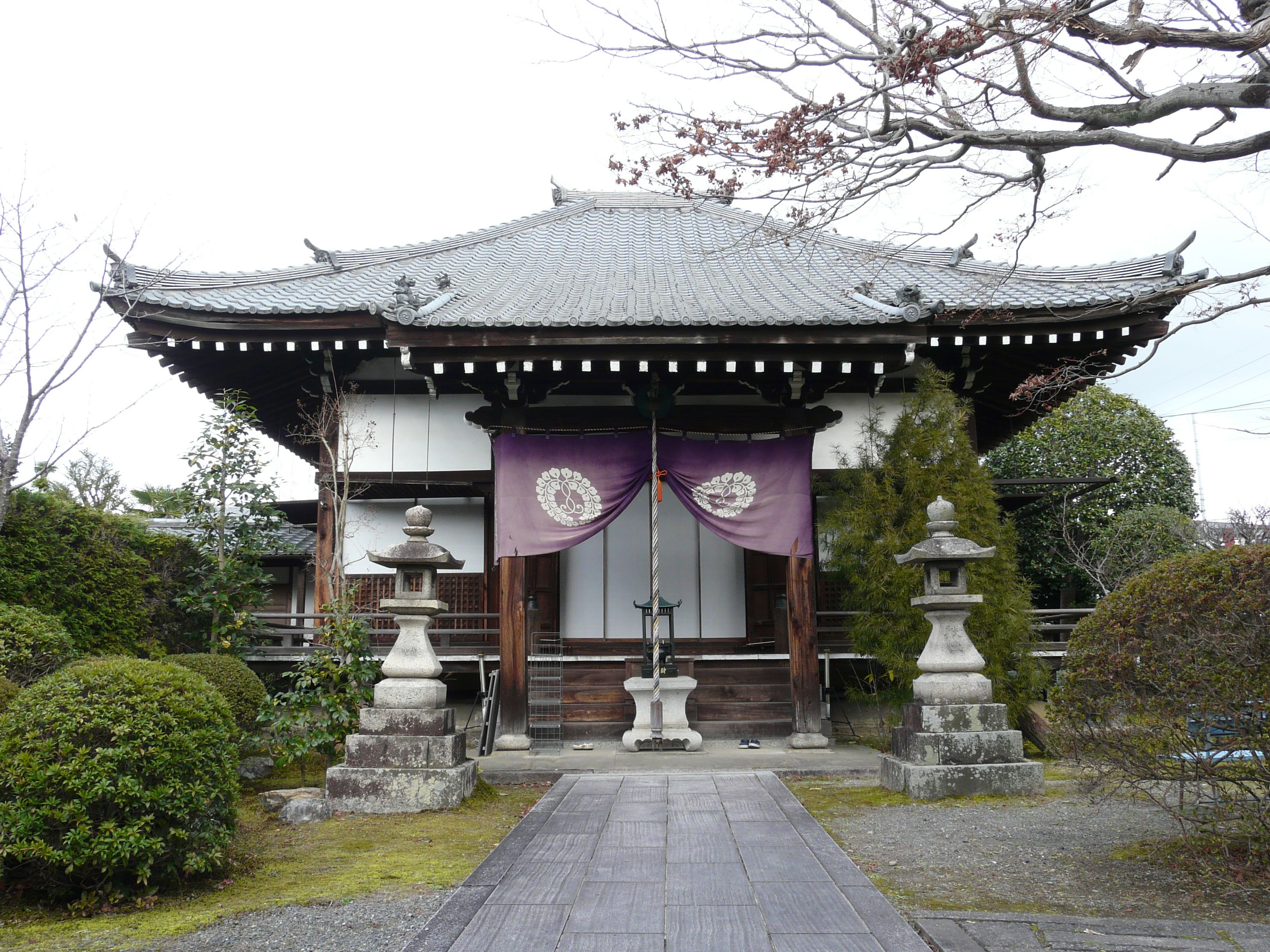
Daishi-do

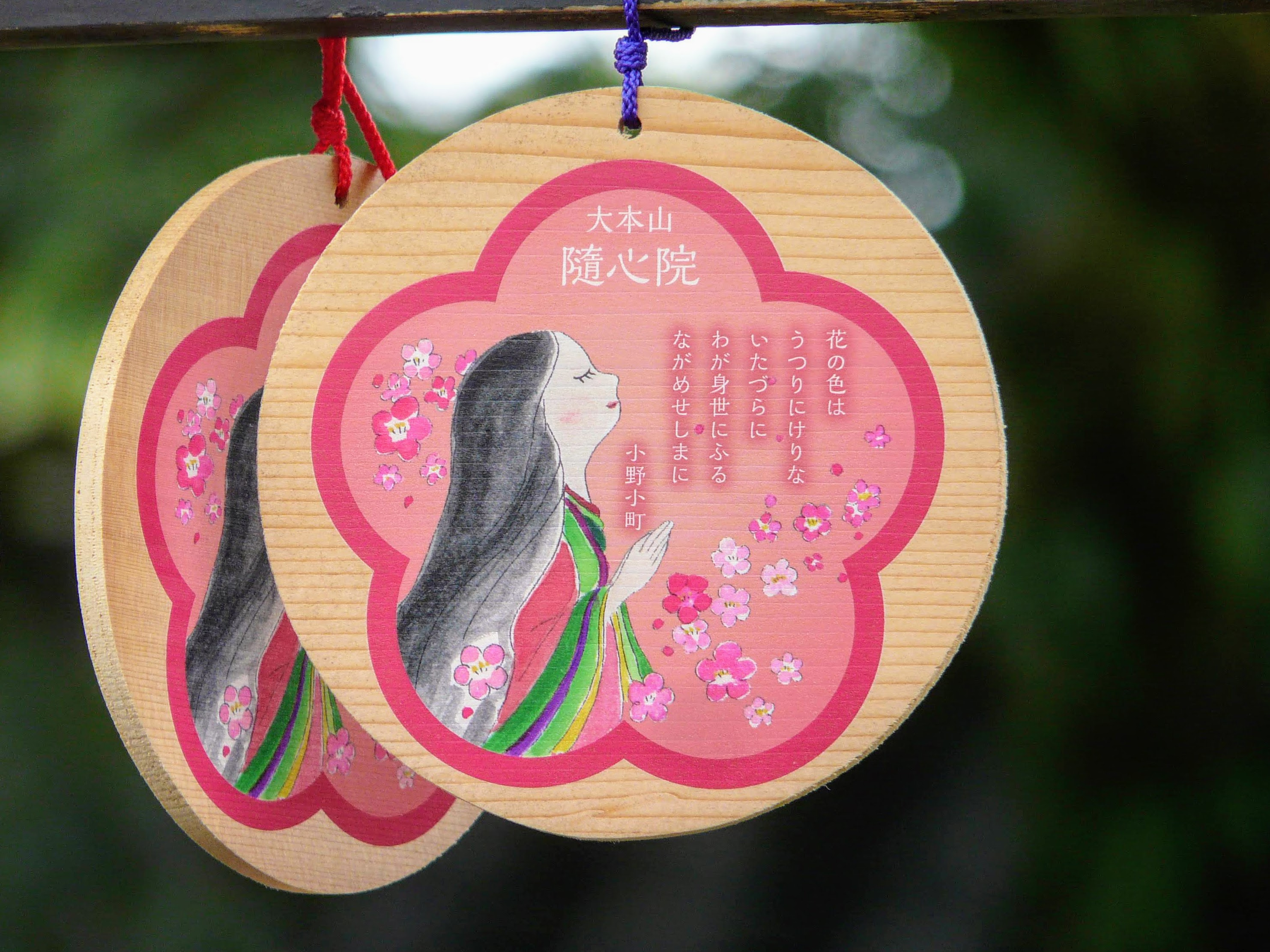
Ono no Komachi ema

The temple is located a three-minute walk from Ono Station on the Kyoto Municipal Subway Tōzai Line.

== See also ==
- List of Historic Sites of Japan (Kyoto)
