= Rishu-kyō =

Vajrayana Buddhist text

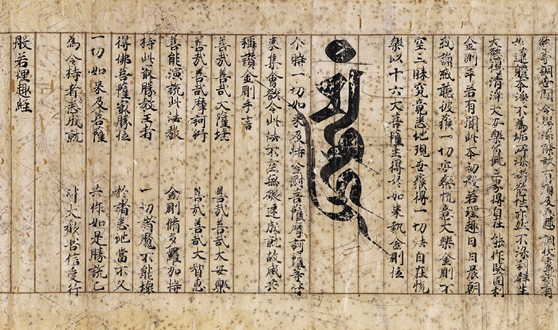
The seventeenth chapter of the Rishu-kyō printed on hakubyō-style (白描) paper. The scroll has been designated as National Treasure of Japan in the category paintings.

The Rishu-kyō (理趣経), formally known as Prajñāpāramitā-naya-śatapañcaśatikā (般若波羅蜜多理趣百五十頌), is a Buddhist esoteric scripture. It is considered an abridged version of the Rishu Kogyo (理趣広経), the sixth assembly of the eighteen assemblies within the Vajrasekhara Sutra (金剛頂経). It is primarily recited in the various branches of the Japanese Shingon school (真言宗) and Chinese esoteric sects as a standard scripture.

It is also referred to as the Adhyardhaśatikā Prajñāpāramitā (百五十頌般若) or Prajñā Rishukyō (般若理趣経).

In Shingon Buddhism, the version translated by Amoghavajra (Taira Kinkō Fuko Shinji Sanmaya Kei, 大楽金剛不空真実三摩耶経, Taishō Tripiṭaka No. 243, lit. Sutra of the Vow of Fulfilling the Great Perpetual Enjoyment and Benefiting All Sentient Beings Without Exception) from 763 to 771 CE, is the most widely recited. This text is considered an adaptation of the Prajñāparamita canon which later developed into an esoteric scripture by a group that compiled the Mahāvairocana-sūtra. Other similar texts include a version translated by Xuanzang.

== Overview ==
The scripture is associated with the Prajñā Sūtras but is often viewed as part of the esoteric scriptures of the Mahayana tradition. The term "Rishu" means "path", representing the "path to attain the wisdom of prajñā." Unlike other esoteric texts that emphasize specific practices, the Rishukyō does not elaborate on such methods, making it an accessible introduction to esoteric Buddhism for the general public.

In the Shingon Buddhist sects, it is a common practice for ordained priests to chant the Rishukyō daily, and one must first receive ordination and be trained how to recite it before actually studying it. The text emphasizes the merits of recitation; unlike other scriptures within the Vajraśekhara or Mahāvairocana Sūtra traditions, the Rishukyō explicitly describes the benefits of recitation, which is why it is used as a daily scripture. The use of Chinese pronunciations (kan-on) rather than the more common Japanese (go-on) pronunciation reflects the period when this text was introduced to Japan.

=== Structure ===
The Rishu-kyō is composed of 17 chapters, excluding the introduction and the concluding chapter:

1. The Way of Supreme Joy (Vajrasattva)
2. The Way of Enlightenment (Vairocana)
3. The Way of Conquest (Sakyamuni)
4. The Way of Seeing the Self-nature (Avalokitesvara)
5. The Way of Discovering the Jewel (Akasagarbha)
6. The Way of Karma (Vajramusti)
7. The Way of Turning the Wheel of a Letter (Akṣara-cakra) (Manjusri)
8. The Way of Entering the Great Wheel (Cakra) (Sahacittotpādadharmacakrapravartin)
9. The Way of Worship (Gaganaganja)
10. The Way of Wrath (Sarvamarabalapramardin)
11. The Way of Assembling the Vow (Samaya) (Samantabhadra)
12. The Way of Empowerment (Vajra‑guhya‑vajra‑mandala)
13. The Way of the Seven Heavenly Mothers
14. The Way of the Three Brothers
15. The Way of the Four Sisters
16. The Way of Perfection
17. The Way of the Mysteries

Each chapter includes specific mantras and mudras for practitioners, the instructions must be transmitted orally (口伝 kuden) by the practitioner's teacher.

=== Seventeen Pure Statements ===
Shingon Buddhism emphasizes "intrinsic purity", similar to the innate enlightenment philosophy of the Tendai school. The Rishukyō asserts that human actions are fundamentally pure, based on this concept.

The first chapter, the Way of Supreme Joy, contains seventeen verses known as the "Seventeen Pure Statements." These affirm that various human experiences and desires are inherently pure and part of the Bodhisattva path, including intimate relationships and sensual experiences, such as sexual intercourse, which the text interprets as an example of a pure spiritual state.

== Historical Development ==
The Rishu-kyō has been central to Shingon practice and has undergone various interpretations. During the Kamakura period, some esoteric groups misinterpreted its teachings, leading to its suppression by the authorities. The text remains a significant scripture in Shingon and other Japanese Buddhist sects, emphasizing the merits of recitation for both spiritual and practical benefits.

=== Dissemination and merits to the public ===
The Rishu-kyō clearly emphasizes the merit (spiritual benefits) of reciting it within its text itself. The highest merit it conveys that is that it opens the path to enlightenment, but it has also been valued in lay society for its more practical benefits, such as warding off illness and increasing income. However, due to certain taboos, laypeople were traditionally discouraged from understanding its contents before World War II. Lay followers were even prohibited from chanting in unison with the priests during memorial services. The reading was done in a Chinese-style pronunciation (kan-on) which is rooted in the oral tradition but also to partly to prevent laypeople from understanding it. Post-war, explanatory books for the general public were published, and it became common for the sutra to be recited during morning prayers and memorial services.

Additionally, sects like Shingon, Tendai, and Sōtō Zen recite Rishubunkyo (理趣分経), an earlier version of the Rishukyo, as part of ceremonies called the "Great Prajnaparamita Recitation Blessing" or "Great Prajnaparamita Recitation Assembly." Among lay followers, it is believed that exposure to the air during these recitations prevents catching colds.

Notably, Etai Yamada, a former head of the Tendai school, would advise young monks training on Mount Hiei, "Do you receive pocket money? If you want some, recite the Rishubunkyo 1,000 times."。Rishubunkyo is, as mentioned, a variant text of the Rishukyo.

== See also ==
- Mikkyō
- Vajrasekhara Sutra
- Shingon Buddhism
- Vajrasattva
- Kūkai
- Saichō
